= List of paintings by Rembrandt =

The following is a list of paintings by Rembrandt that are accepted as autograph by the Rembrandt Research Project. For other catalogues raisonnés of Rembrandt, see the "Rembrandt" navigation box below.

Image	Title	Year	Technique	Dimensions (cm)	Gallery	Number	Commentary
	The Spectacles-pedlar (Sight)	c. 1624	Oil on panel	21 × 17.8	Stedelijk Museum De Lakenhal, Leiden	1	Hypothetical; one of the series The Senses
	The Three Singers (Hearing)	c. 1624	Oil on panel	21.6 × 17.8	Leiden Collection	2	Hypothetical; one of the series The Senses
	The Operation (Touch)	c. 1624	Oil on panel	21.5 × 17.7	Leiden Collection	3	Hypothetical; one of the series The Senses
	The Unconscious Patient (Smell)	c. 1624	Oil on panel	21.5 × 17.7	Leiden Collection	3A	Hypothetical; one of the series The Senses
	Christ Driving the Money-changers from the Temple	1626	Oil on panel	43.1 × 32	Pushkin Museum, Moscow	4	
	The Stoning of St. Stephen	1625	Oil on panel	89.5 × 123.6	Musée des beaux-arts de Lyon	5	
	Bust of a Man Wearing a Gorget and Plumed Beret	1626	Oil on panel	40 × 29.4	Private collection	6	
	History Painting	1626	Oil on panel	90 × 122	Stedelijk Museum De Lakenhal, Leiden	7	Subject still under discussion
	David with the Head of Goliath before Saul	1626/1627	Oil on panel	27.2 × 39.6	Kunstmuseum Basel	8	
	The Baptism of the Eunuch	1626	Oil on panel	63.5 × 48	Museum Catharijneconvent, Utrecht	9	The abraded face of Philip has been unsatisfactorily retouched
	Balaam and the Ass	1626	Oil on panel	63.2 × 46.5	Musée Cognacq-Jay, Paris	10	
	Musical Allegory	1626	Oil on panel	63.4 × 47.6	Rijksmuseum Amsterdam	11	
	Tobit Accusing Anna of Stealing the Kid	1626	Oil on panel	40.1 × 29.9	Rijksmuseum Amsterdam	12	
	The Flight into Egypt	1627	Oil on panel	27.5 × 24.7	Musée des Beaux-Arts de Tours	13	
	The Rich Man from the Parable	1627	Oil on panel	31.7 × 42.5	Gemäldegalerie, Berlin	14	
	The apostle Paul in Prison	1627	Oil on panel	72.8 × 60.2	Staatsgalerie Stuttgart	15	There are darkened overpaintings on both sides of the seams of the panel
	Simeon in the Temple	c. 1628	Oil on panel	55.4 × 43.7	Kunsthalle Hamburg	16	Mary’s cloak has been overpainted by another hand later; it was probably a lighter blue-grey in the original
	The Foot Operation	1628	Oil on panel	31.8 × 24.4	Private collection, on permanent loan at Kunstmuseum Winterthur	17	
	Rembrandt Laughing	c. 1628	Oil on copper	22.2 × 17.1	J. Paul Getty Museum, Los Angeles	18	
	Self-Portrait Study in the Mirror (the Human Skin)	c. 1627/1628	Oil on panel	42.8 × 33	Indianapolis Museum of Art	19	
	Lighting Study in the Mirror	c. 1628	Oil on panel	22.6 × 18.7	Rijksmuseum Amsterdam	20	
	Bust of a Man Wearing a Turban	c. 1628	Oil on panel	26.7 × 20.3	The Kremer collection	21	
	Interior with figures, called La main chaude	c. 1628	Oil on panel	21 × 27	National Gallery of Ireland, Dublin	22	
	Judas Repentant, Returning the Pieces of Silver	1629	Oil on panel	79 × 102.3	Private collection	23	
	The Painter in his Studio (‘Idea’)	c. 1628	Oil on panel	24.8 × 31.7	Museum of Fine Arts, Boston	24	
	The Supper at Emmaus	1629	Oil on panel	37.4 × 42.3	Musée Jacquemart-André, Paris	25	
	An Old Man Asleep by the Fire (perhaps typifying ‘Sloth’)	1629	Oil on panel	51.9 × 40.8	Sabauda Gallery, Turin	26	
	Two Old Men Disputing (St. Peter and St. Paul)	1628	Oil on panel	72.3 × 59.5	National Gallery of Victoria, Melbourne	27	
	The apostle Paul at his Writing Desk	c. 1629/1630	Oil on panel	47.2 × 38	Germanisches Nationalmuseum, Nuremberg	28	The painting is covered with a thick layer of yellowed varnish
	Self-portrait with Plumed Beret	1629	Oil on panel	89.7 × 73.5	Isabella Stewart Gardner Museum, Boston	29	
	Self-portrait with a Gorget	c. 1629	Oil on panel	38.2 × 31	Germanisches Nationalmuseum, Nuremberg	30	The painting is covered by a layer of yellowed varnish and shows darkened retouches
	Self-portrait Lit from the Left	1629	Oil on panel	15.5 × 12.7	Alte Pinakothek, Munich	31	
	Self-portrait with Beret and Gathered Shirt (‘stilus mediocris’)	1630	Oil on copper	15 × 12.2	Nationalmuseum, Stockholm	33	
	Bust of an Old Woman at Prayer (‘stilus gravis’)	c. 1630	Oil on copper	15.5 × 12.2	Residenzgalerie, Salzburg	34	
	Laughing Soldier (‘stilus humilis’)	c. 1630	Oil on copper	15.3 × 12.2	Mauritshuis, The Hague	35	
	Bust of an Old Man	1630	Oil on panel	18.2 × 17.4	Private collection	36	Reduced to an oval form, subsequently made into a rectangle by additions
	Samson Betrayed by Delilah	c. 1628–1630	Oil on panel	61.3 × 50.1	Gemäldegalerie, Berlin	37	
	David Playing the Harp for King Saul	c. 1630	Oil on panel	62 × 50	Städel, Frankfurt am Main	38	The painting is poorly preserved in the thinner areas
	Jeremiah Lamenting the Destruction of Jerusalem	1630	Oil on panel	58.3 × 46.6	Rijksmuseum Amsterdam	39	
	St. Peter in Prison	1631	Oil on panel	59.1 × 47.8	Israel Museum, Jerusalem	40	
	Andromeda Chained to the Rocks	c. 1630	Oil on panel	34.5 × 25	Mauritshuis, The Hague	41	The painting has been cropped on all sides
	The Good Samaritan	1630	Oil on panel	24.2 × 19.8	Wallace Collection, London	42	
	Bust of an Old Man Wearing a Fur Cap	1629	Oil on panel	22.2 × 17.7	Tyrolean State Museum, Innsbruck	43	
	Oil Study of an Old Man	1630	Oil on panel	24.3 × 20.3	Agnes Etherington Art Centre, Kingston	44	
	Oil Study of an Old Man	c. 1630	Oil on panel	19.5 × 16	Statens Museum for Kunst, Copenhagen	45	
	Bust of an Old Man	c. 1630	Oil on panel	46.9 × 38.8	Mauritshuis, The Hague	46	
	Simeon in the Temple	1631	Oil on panel	60.9 × 47.9	Mauritshuis, The Hague	47	
	The Raising of Lazarus	c. 1630–1632	Oil on panel	96.2 × 81.5	Los Angeles County Museum of Art	48	The panel was originally taller
	The Abduction of Proserpina	c. 1631	Oil on panel	84.8 × 79.7	Gemäldegalerie, Berlin	49	The panel, which was originally taller, must have been cropped at top and bottom. An ultramarine blue sky was discovered under a greyish overpainting and taken to be the original sky
	The Abduction of Europa	1632	Oil on panel	62.2 × 77	J. Paul Getty Museum, Los Angeles	50	
	An Old Woman Reading, probably the Prophetess Anna	1631	Oil on panel	59.8 × 47.7	Rijksmuseum Amsterdam	51	
	Christ on the Cross	1631	Oil, transferred from panel to canvas and then stuck on to panel	99.9 × 72.6	Parish Church, Le Mas d'Agenais	52	
	The Artist in an Oriental Costume, with a Poodle at his Feet	1631	Oil on panel	66.5 × 52	Petit Palais, Paris	53	The dog added in late 1632 or early 1633
	Minerva in her Study	c. 1631	Oil on panel	60.5 × 49	Gemäldegalerie, Berlin	54	
	Bust of an Old Man with a Cap and Gold Chain	c. 1631	Oil on panel	59.9 × 51.1	Private collection	55	
	A Man Wearing a Gorget and Plumed Cap	c. 1631	Oil on panel	66 × 50.8	J. Paul Getty Museum, Los Angeles	56	
	Bust of a Young Man Wearing a Plumed Cap	1631 – c. 1635	Oil on canvas	80.3 × 64.8	Toledo Museum of Art	57	
	Half-figure of a Man Wearing a Gorget and Plumed Hat	1631	Oil on panel	83.5 × 75.6	Art Institute of Chicago	58	The painting was originally 7 cm taller
	Portrait of Nicolaes Ruts	1631	Oil on panel	116 × 87	Frick Collection, New York	59	
	Portrait of a Man at a Writing Desk, possibly Jacob Bruyningh	1631	Oil on canvas	104.4 × 91.8	Hermitage Museum, Saint Petersburg	60	The painting originally seems to have been 9 cm taller
	A Lady and Gentleman in Black	1632	Oil on canvas	131.5 × 109	Stolen from the Isabella Stewart Gardner Museum, Boston	61	The painting must have been substantially reduced on the left, now showing only part of the original composition; the chair on the left is probably a later addition, apparently intended to balance the composition on this side when the canvas was reduced
	Portrait of a Man	1632	Oil on panel	90.8 × 68.57	Kunsthistorisches Museum, Vienna	62a	Companion piece to 62b
	Portrait of a Woman	1632	Oil on panel	90 × 68	Kunsthistorisches Museum, Vienna	62b	Rembrandt and (mainly) workshop. Companion piece to 62a
	Portrait of a Man, probably a Member of the Van Beresteyn Family	1632	Oil on canvas	112 × 89	Metropolitan Museum of Art, New York	63a	Companion piece to 63b
	Portrait of a Woman, probably a Member of the Van Beresteyn Family	1632	Oil on canvas	112.5 × 88.8	Metropolitan Museum of Art, New York	63b	Rembrandt and (mainly) workshop. Companion piece to 63a. The woman’s left hand, which originally hung in a lower position, and the table on which it now rests, are probably executed by Rembrandt himself
	Portrait of a Man Trimming his Quill	1632	Oil on canvas	101.5 × 81.5	Schloss Wilhelmshöhe, Kassel	64a	Companion piece to 64b
	Portrait of a Woman Seated	1632	Oil on canvas	92 × 71	Academy of Fine Arts Vienna	64b	Rembrandt (and workshop?) Companion piece to 64a. The painting was cropped on all sides
	Portrait of Princess Amalia van Solms	1632	Oil on canvas	69.5 × 54.4	Musée Jacquemart-André, Paris	65b	Companion piece to 65a: G. van Honthorst, Portrait of Prince Frederik Hendrik of Orange, 1631. The Hague, Huis ten Bosch (Dutch Royal Collection). The two paintings must originally have had identical surrounds. At a later stage 65b was cropped on all sides. The face has suffered from surface wear
	Self-portrait as a Burger	1632	Oil on panel	64.4 × 47.6	Burrell Collection, Glasgow	66	
	Portrait of Maurits Huygens	1632	Oil on panel	31.1 × 24.5	Hamburger Kunsthalle	67	
	Portrait of Jacob de Gheyn III	1632	Oil on panel	29.9 × 24.9	Dulwich Picture Gallery, London	68	
	Self-portrait	1632	Oil on panel	21.8 × 16.3	Sold at auction (Sotheby's, July 28, 2020), buyer unknown	69	
	Portrait of Joris de Caullery	1632	Oil, canvas on panel	102.5 × 83.8	Fine Arts Museums of San Francisco	70	
	Portrait of a Young Man	1632	Oil on panel	63 × 46	Suermondt-Ludwig-Museum, Aachen	71	
	Portrait of Marten Looten	1632	Oil on panel	92.8 × 74.9	Los Angeles County Museum of Art	72	
	Portrait of a 40-year-old Man	1632	Oil on panel	75.6 × 52.1	Metropolitan Museum of Art, New York	73	
	Portrait of a 39-year-old Woman	1632	Oil on panel	74.5 × 55	Nivaagaards Malerisamling	74	The hand and the booklet were added by another painter
	Portrait of a 62-year-old Woman, possibly Aeltje Pietersdr Uylenburgh	1632	Oil on panel	73.5 × 55	Museum of Fine Arts, Boston	75	
	The Anatomy Lesson of Dr. Tulp	1632	Oil on canvas	169.5 × 216.5	Mauritshuis, The Hague	76	
	Portraits of Jean Pellicorne and his Son Casper	1632	Oil on canvas	155 × 123	Wallace Collection, London	77a	Rembrandt and (almost entirely) workshop. Companion piece to 77b
	Portraits of Susanna van Collen and her Daughter Anna	1632	Oil on canvas	153 × 121	Wallace Collection, London	77b	Rembrandt and (in the main parts) workshop. Companion piece to 77a
	Bust of a Young Woman	1632	Oil on panel	60.6 × 45	Leiden Collection	78	
	Bust of a Young Woman in a Cap	1632	Oil on canvas mounted on panel	60.6 × 45	Private collection	79	Originally rectangular and larger on all sides
	Half-figure of a Young Woman in Profile with a Fan	1632	Oil on canvas	72.5 × 54.8	Nationalmuseum, Stockholm	80	Reduced on all sides
	Bearded Old Man	1632	Oil on panel	66.5 × 51	Fogg Museum, Cambridge, Massachusetts	81	
	Study of an Old Man with a Gold Chain	1632	Oil on panel	59 × 46.5	Schloss Wilhelmshöhe, Kassel	82	
	The Apostle Peter	1632	Oil on canvas	81.3 × 66.2	Nationalmuseum, Stockholm	83	
	Knee-length Figure of a Man in an Oriental Dress (‘The Noble Slav’)	1632	Oil on panel	152.7 × 111.1	Metropolitan Museum of Art, New York	84	
	A Scholar Near a Window (a study in ‘kamerlicht’)	1631	Oil on panel	60.8 × 47.3	Nationalmuseum, Stockholm	85	An engraved reproduction from c. 1650 by Pieter de Baillu is captioned "S. Anastasius"
	Philosopher in Meditation	1632	Oil on panel	28.2 × 34.4	Musée du Louvre, Paris	86	Possibly a scene from the Book of Tobit. The figure of a woman on the stairs is practically invisible today
	Portrait of a Man	1638	Oil on panel	63.5 × 47.3	Herzog Anton Ulrich Museum, Braunschweig	87a	Companion piece to 87b
	Portrait of a Woman	1638	Oil on panel	63 × 48	Herzog Anton Ulrich Museum, Braunschweig	87b	Companion piece to 87a
	Portrait of a Man Rising from his Chair	1633	Oil on canvas	124 × 98.5	Taft Museum of Art, Cincinnati	88a	Rembrandt and (perhaps) workshop. Companion piece to 88b
	Portrait of a Young Woman with a Fan	1633	Oil on canvas	126.2 × 100.5	Metropolitan Museum of Art, New York	88b	Companion piece to 88a
	Portrait of Jan Rijcksen and his Wife Griet Jans	1633	Oil on canvas	111 × 166	Royal Collection	89	
	Portrait of Johannes Wtenbogaert	1633	Oil on canvas	123 × 105	Rijksmuseum Amsterdam	90	Rembrandt and workshop. The hands seem to be painted by a member of the workshop
	Portrait of Man	1633	Oil on canvas	128.5 × 100.5	Schloss Wilhelmshöhe, Kassel	91	Rembrandt and/or workshop? Originally this portrait was probably full size
	Portrait of a Man Wearing a Red Doublet	1633	Oil on panel	63.5 × 50.5	Leiden Collection	92	
	Portrait of a Young Woman	1633	Oil on panel	63.5 × 47.5	Museum of Fine Arts, Houston	93	
	Bust of Saskia Smiling	1633	Oil on panel	52.5 × 44	Staatliche Kunstsammlungen Dresden	94	
	Half-length Portrait of Saskia van Uylenburgh	c. 1633–1642	Oil on panel	99.5 × 78.8	Schloss Wilhelmshöhe, Kassel	95	An 18th-century document provides evidence that the painting originally measured c. 128 × 104.5 cm and was rounded above
	Self-portrait with Gold Chain	1633	Oil on panel	61 × 48.1	Musée du Louvre, Paris	96	
	Self-portrait with Beret and Gold Chain	1633	Oil on panel	70.4 × 54	Musée du Louvre, Paris	97	
	Bust of Young Woman	1633	Oil on panel	65 × 48	Rijksmuseum Amsterdam	98	
	Man in Oriental Costume	c. 1633–1634	Oil on canvas	98 × 74	National Gallery of Art, Washington	99	Rembrandt and pupil(?). This work was probably larger on all sides
	A Young Woman (Esther? Judith?) at her Toilet	1633	Oil on canvas	110.5 × 94.3	National Gallery of Canada, Ottawa	100	
	Bellona	1633	Oil on canvas	127 × 97.5	Metropolitan Museum of Art, New York	101	
	Daniel Refuses to Worship the Idol Baal	1633	Oil on panel	23.4 × 30.1	J. Paul Getty Museum, Los Angeles	102	
	The Vision of Zacharias in the Temple	1633	Oil on panel	58 × 48	private collection		Re-attributed by the Rijksmuseum in 2026
	A Bust of an Old Man	1633	Grisaille, paper on panel	10.6 × 7.2	Leiden Collection	103	
	Bust of a Man in Oriental Dress	1633	Oil on panel	85.8 × 63.8	Alte Pinakothek, Munich	104	
	The Storm on the Sea of Galilee	1633	Oil on canvas	160 × 128	Stolen from the Isabella Stewart Gardner Museum, Boston	105	
	The Raising of the Cross	1633	Oil on canvas	95.7 × 72.2	Alte Pinakothek, Munich	106	Part of the Passion series for Frederik Hendrik
	The Descent from the Cross	1632/1633	Oil on panel	89.6 × 65	Alte Pinakothek, Munich	107	Part of the Passion series for Frederik Hendrik
	Joseph Telling his Dreams	1634	Grisaille, paper stuck on card	55.8 × 39.7	Rijksmuseum Amsterdam	108	Made in preparation for an unfinished printed Passion series
	The Adoration of the Magi	1633	Grisaille, paper stuck on card(?)	44.8 × 39.1	Hermitage Museum, Saint Petersburg	109	Made in preparation for an unfinished printed Passion series
	John the Baptist Preaching	c. 1633/1634	Grisaille, canvas (enlarged) stuck on panel	62.7 × 81.1	Gemäldegalerie, Berlin	110	
	Christ and his Disciples in Gethsemane	1634	Drawing on paper. Pen and brown ink with brown and other washes and red and black chalk	35.7 × 48.8	Teylers Museum, Haarlem	111	Although executed with drawing materials on paper, in view of its presumed function this work is counted here among Rembrandt’s grisailles in preparation for an unfinished printed Passion series
	Ecce Homo	1634	Grisaille, paper on canvas	54.5 × 44.5	National Gallery, London	112	Grisaille in preparation for an unfinished printed Passion series
	The Lamentation	c. 1633/1634	Grisaille, paper on canvas; enlarged by another hand on a panel measuring 31.9 × 26.7 cm	31.9 × 26.7	National Gallery, London	113	Grisaille may be fragment of the planned Passion series
	The Entombment	1633/1634	Grisaille, panel	32.1 × 40.3	Hunterian Museum and Art Gallery, Glasgow	114	Grisaille may be fragment of the planned Passion series
	Portrait of a Young Bachelor	1634	Oil on panel	70 × 52	Hermitage Museum, Saint Petersburg	115	The painting is covered by a layer of yellowed varnish
	Portrait of an 83-year Old Woman (possibly Aechje Claesdr, mother of Dirck Jansz Pesser)	1634	Oil on panel	68.7 × 53.8	National Gallery, London	116	
	Portrait of Dirck Jansz Pesser	1634	Oil on panel	71 × 53	Los Angeles County Museum of Art	117a	Companion piece to 117b
	Portret of van Haesje Jacobsdr van Cleyburgh	1634	Oil on panel	71 × 53	Rijksmuseum Amsterdam	117b	Companion piece to 117a
	Portrait of a Man in a Broad-brimmed Hat	1634	Oil on panel	70 × 53	Museum of Fine Arts, Boston	118a	Rembrandt and mainly workshop. Companion piece to 118b
	Portrait of a Woman	1634	Oil on panel	69.5 × 53	Museum of Fine Arts, Boston	118b	Companion piece to 118a
	Portrait of a 41-year-old Man, possibly Pieter Sijen	1633	Oil on panel	69.3 × 54.8	Norton Simon Museum, Pasadena	119a	Companion piece to 119b
	Portrait of a 40-year-old Woman, possibly Marretje Cornelisdr van Grotewal	1634	Oil on panel	69 × 55	Speed Art Museum, Louisville	119b	Companion piece to 119a
	Portrait of Maerten Soolmans	1634	Oil on canvas	207 × 132.5	Joint ownership by Rijksmuseum and The Louvre	120a	Companion piece to 120b
	Portrait of Oopjen Coppit	1634	Oil on canvas	207 × 132	Joint ownership between The Louvre and Rijksmuseum	120b	Companion piece to 120a
	Portrait of Reverend Johannes Elison	1634	Oil on canvas	173 × 123	Museum of Fine Arts, Boston	121a	Companion piece to 121b
	Portrait of Maria Bockenolle	1634	Oil on canvas	174.5 × 123	Museum of Fine Arts, Boston	121b	Companion piece to 121a
	Oval Self-portrait with Shaded Eyes	1634	Oil on panel	70.8 × 55.2	Leiden Collection, New York	122	
	Self-portrait in a Cap and Fur-trimmed Cloak	1634	Oil on panel	58.3 × 47.5	Gemäldegalerie, Berlin	123	The painting is covered by a layer of yellowed varnish
	Cupid Blowing a Soap Bubble	1634	Oil on canvas	75 × 92.62	Liechtenstein Museum, Vienna	124	
	Flora	1634	Oil on canvas	125 × 101	Hermitage Museum, Saint Petersburg	125	
	The Descent from the Cross	1634	Oil on canvas	159.3 × 116.4	Hermitage Museum, Saint Petersburg	126	
	The Incredulity of Thomas	1634	Oil on panel	53 × 50	Pushkin Museum, Moscow	127	
	Sophonisba Receiving the Poisoned Cup	1634	Oil on canvas	142 × 153	Museo del Prado, Madrid	128	
	A Scholar, Seated at a Table with Books	1634	Oil on canvas	145 × 134	National Gallery in Prague	129	
	Diana Bathing with her Nymphs, with the Stories of Actaeon and Callisto	1634	Oil on panel	73.5 × 93.5	Museum Wasserburg, Anholt	130	
	The Flight into Egypt	1634	Oil on panel	52 × 40.1	Private collection	130A	
	The Holy Family	1634	Oil on canvas	195 × 132	Alte Pinakothek, Munich	131	The painting was originally probably wider than it is today
	Portrait of Philips Lucasz	1635	Oil on panel	79.5 × 58.9	National Gallery, London	132a	Rembrandt and workshop. Companion piece to 132b
	Portrait of Petronella Buys	1635	Oil on panel	78.8 × 65.3	Leiden Collection, New York	132b	Rembrandt and workshop. Companion piece to 132a
	Portrait of a Man in a Slouched Hat and Bandoleer	1635	Oil on canvas	78.5 × 65.7	Kawamura Memorial DIC Museum of Art, Sakura	133a	Rembrandt and/or workshop. Companion piece to 133b. The painting suffered severely when it was transferred from panel to canvas in 1929 and also from overcleaning. Originally rectangular and possibly also larger below
	Portrait of a Young Woman	1635	Oil on panel	78 × 65	Cleveland Museum of Art	133b	Rembrandt and mainly workshop. Companion piece to 133a. The painting has suffered severely from overcleaning. Originally rectangular and possibly also larger below
	Self-portrait wearing a white feathered bonnet	1635	Oil on canvas	90.5 × 71.8	Buckland Abbey	134	Rembrandt (and workshop?)
	Self-portrait as the Prodigal Son in the Tavern	1635	Oil on canvas	161 × 131	Staatliche Kunstsammlungen Dresden	135	The reconstruction of the stretcher on the basis of the X-ray shows just how much the painting was reduced in size. The paint surface of the lower part of the remaining fragment suffered badly, such that it had to be repainted
	Abraham's Sacrifice	1635	Oil on canvas	193.5 × 132.8	Hermitage Museum, Saint Petersburg	136	The painting is covered by a layer of yellowed varnish
	The Rape of Ganymede	1635	Oil on canvas	177 × 130	Staatliche Kunstsammlungen Dresden	137	
	Flora	1635	Oil on canvas	123.5 × 97.5	National Gallery, London	138	
	Minerva	1635	Oil on canvas	137 × 116	Leiden Collection, New York	139	
	Samson Threatening his Father-in-law	c. 1635	Oil on canvas	159 × 131	Gemäldegalerie, Berlin	140	
	Bust of a Man in Oriental Dress	1635	Oil on panel	72 × 54.5	Rijksmuseum Amsterdam	141	
	Bust of a Bearded Old man in Fanciful Costume	1635	Oil on panel	72.5 × 62.1	Royal Collection	142	
	Belshazzar’s Feast	1635	Oil on canvas	167.6 × 209.2	National Gallery, London	143	On the basis of the pattern of cusping, it may be concluded that the painting was tilted to the left by later hands and cut to shape accordingly. This is also apparent from the edge of the table and the stream of wine poured from the jug by the woman on the right
	Susanna Bathing	1636	Oil on panel	47.2 × 38.6	Mauritshuis, The Hague	144	
	The Ascension	1636	Oil on canvas	93 × 68.7	Alte Pinakothek, Munich	145	Part of the Passion series for Frederik Hendrik
	Self-portrait Transformed into a ‘tronie’	c. 1633–1636	Oil on panel	56 × 47	Gemäldegalerie, Berlin	146	
	The Standard-Bearer	1636	Oil on canvas	118.8 × 96.8	Rijksmuseum Amsterdam	147	
	The Blinding of Samson	1636	Oil on canvas	205 × 272	Städel, Frankfurt am Main	148	
	Danaë	c. 1636 – c. 1643	Oil on canvas	185 × 203	Hermitage Museum, Saint Petersburg	149	The painting was very badly damaged in 1985
	The Angel Raphael Leaving Tobit and his Family	1637	Oil on panel	66 × 52	Musée du Louvre, Paris	150	
	The Parable of the Labourers in the Vineyard	1637	Oil on panel	31 × 42	Hermitage Museum, Saint Petersburg	151	The paint of the figures to the right have suffered from blanching
	River Landscape with Ruins	c. 1637 – c. 1645	Oil on panel	67 × 87.5	Schloss Wilhelmshöhe, Kassel	152	The mill together with its immediate surroundings was originally placed in a flat Dutch landscape. Rembrandt transformed it into classical mountainous landscape around 1645
	The Concord of the State	1637	Oil on panel	74.6 × 101	Museum Boijmans Van Beuningen, Rotterdam	153	Grisaille serving as a design for a political print which was never realized
	Self-portrait	1637	Oil on panel	64 × 49	Wallace Collection, London	154	The painting originally was larger (c. 75 × 55 cm) and rectangular. The upper corners of the background are digitally reconstructed
	A Polish Nobleman	1637	Oil on panel	96.7 × 66.1	National Gallery of Art, Washington	155	
	Portrait of the Preacher Eleazar Swalmius	1637	Oil on canvas	132 × 109	Royal Museum of Fine Arts Antwerp	156	
	Old Rabbi with cap	c. 1640	Oil on canvas	59 × 49 (unframed)	Private collection	156 bis	
	Bust of a Man with Plumed Cap	1637	Oil on panel	62.5 × 47	Mauritshuis, The Hague	157	
	Christ and St Mary Magdalen at the Tomb	1638	Oil on panel	61 × 49.5	Royal Collection	158	
	Landscape with the Good Samaritan	1638	Oil on panel	46.5 × 66	Czartoryski Museum, Kraków	159	
	The Wedding of Samson	1638	Oil on canvas	126 × 175	Staatliche Kunstsammlungen Dresden	160	
	Woman with a Mirror	1638	Oil on panel	23.9 × 32.5	Hermitage Museum, Saint Petersburg	161	
	The Entombment	1635–1639	Oil on canvas	92.6 × 68.9	Alte Pinakothek, Munich	162	Part of the Passion series for Frederik Hendrik
	The Resurrection	1639	Oil on canvas	92.9 × 67	Alte Pinakothek, Munich	163	Part of the Passion series for Frederik Hendrik
	King Uzziah Stricken with Leprosy	c. 1639/1640	Oil on panel	102.8 × 78.8	Chatsworth House	164	Covered with a disturbing layer of yellowed varnish. The dark patches in Uzziah’s face are probably painted indications of his leprosy
	Two Dead Peacocks and a Girl	1639	Oil on canvas	145 × 135.5	Rijksmuseum Amsterdam	165	
	A Dead Bittern	1639	Oil on panel	120.7 × 88.3	Staatliche Kunstsammlungen Dresden	166	The painting is covered by a layer of yellowed varnish
	Portrait of a Man Holding a Hat	c. 1640	Oil on panel	81.4 × 71.4	Hammer Museum, Los Angeles	167	The panel has been trimmed on all sides. It belonged to a batch of equally large poplar panels, which makes it possible to speculate about the original size of the painting
	Portrait of a Man Standing, possibly Andries de Graeff	1639	Oil on canvas	200 × 124.2	Schloss Wilhelmshöhe, Kassel	168	
	Portrait of Aletta Adriaensdr	1639	Oil on panel	64.7 × 55.3	Museum Boijmans Van Beuningen, Rotterdam	169	The heavily damaged fingers were reconstructed during a restoration in the 1960s
	Self-portrait	1640	Oil on panel	80.5 × 62.8	Musée du Louvre, Paris	170	Rembrandt and workshop? Adaption of an earlier self-portrait
	Bust of Young Woman	c. 1640	Oil on panel	60.5 × 49	National Gallery of Art, Washington	171	
	Self-portrait	c. 1639	Oil on panel	63 × 50.1	Norton Simon Museum, Pasadena	172	
	The Holy Family with St Anne	1640	Oil on panel	40.6 × 34	Musée du Louvre, Paris	173	The painting is covered by a layer of yellowed varnish
	The Visitation	1640	Oil on panel	56.5 × 47.8	Detroit Institute of Arts	174	
	Landscape with Arched Bridge	c. 1637/1638	Oil on canvas	29 × 40	Gemäldegalerie, Berlin		
	Landscape with a Stone Bridge	c. 1638/1640	Oil on canvas	29.5 × 42.5	Rijksmuseum Amsterdam	175	
	Mountain Landscape with Approaching Storm	1640	Oil on panel	52 × 72	Herzog Anton Ulrich Museum, Braunschweig	176	
	Portrait of Herman Doomer	1640	Oil on panel	75.2 × 55.3	Metropolitan Museum of Art, New York	177a	Companion piece to 177b
	Portrait of Baertje Martens	1640	Oil on panel	75.1 × 55.9	Hermitage Museum, Saint Petersburg	177b	Companion piece to 177a
	Self-portrait	c. 1640	Oil on panel	72.2 × 58.3	Thyssen-Bornemisza Museum, Madrid	178	The panel was slightly cropped later; the roughly blocked out hand was revealed during a restoration. Originally it must have been painted out by Rembrandt himself
	Self-Portrait at the Age of 34	1640	Oil on canvas	93 × 80	National Gallery, London	179	
	Portrait of a Woman, possibly Anna Wijmer	1641	Oil on panel	99.5 × 81.5	Six Foundation, Amsterdam	180	
	Saskia as Flora	1641	Oil on panel	98.5 × 82.5	Staatliche Kunstsammlungen Dresden	181	The paint is covered by a disturbing yellowed layer of varnish
	Oil Study of a Woman Lit Obliquely from Behind	1640	Oil on panel	46.5 × 37.5	Leiden Collection, New York	182	
	Portrait of the Mennonite Preacher Cornelius Claesz Anslo and his Wife Aaltje Gerritsdr Shouten	1641	Oil on canvas	176 × 210	Gemäldegalerie, Berlin	183	
	Portrait of Maria Trip	1641(?)	Oil on canvas	107 × 82	Rijksmuseum Amsterdam	184b	Rembrandt and the painter of 184a. Companion piece to 184a: Rembrandt workshop, Portrait of a man (Balthasar Coymans?). 1641 (?). Private collection
	A Scholar at a Writing Desk	1641	Oil on panel	104 × 76	Royal Castle, Warsaw	185	
	Girl in Fanciful Costume in a Picture Frame	1641	Oil on panel	104 × 76	Royal Castle, Warsaw	186	
	Portrait of Nicolas van Bambeeck in a Picture Frame	1641	Oil on canvas	108.8 × 83.3	Royal Museums of Fine Arts of Belgium, Brussels	187a	Companion piece to 187b
	Portrait of Agatha Bas in a Picture Frame	1641	Oil on canvas	104 × 82	Royal Collection	187b	Companion piece to 187a
	David’s Parting from Jonathan	1642	Oil on panel	73 × 61	Hermitage Museum, Saint Petersburg	188	
	Self-Portrait	1642	Oil on panel	69.9 × 58.4	Royal Collection	189	The costume and the hand are largely overpainted by a much later hand
	The Company of Captain Frans Banning Cocq and Lieutenant Willem van Ruytenburch (Night Watch)	1642	Oil on canvas	363 × 438	Rijksmuseum Amsterdam	190	Actually: ‘The painting in the great hall of the Kloveniers Doelen in which the young Lord of Purmerland [Frans Banninck Cocq] as Captain, gives the order to his Lieutenant, the Lord of Vlaerdingen [Willem van Ruytenburgh] to march off his Company of Citizens’, as the painting is called in the family album of Frans Banninck Cocq. The painting has been cropped on all four sides
	Portrait of a Man with a Hawk	1643	Oil on canvas	114 × 97.3	Private collection	191a	Rembrandt and workshop. Companion piece to 191b
	Portrait of a Woman with a Fan	1643	Oil on canvas	114.5 × 98	Private collection	191b	Rembrandt and (mainly) workshop. Companion piece to 191a
	An Old Man in Rich Costume (Boaz?)	1643	Oil on panel	72.5 × 58.5	Woburn Abbey	192	Possibly companion piece to 193. The series of curved cracks in the panel and paintlayer are typical for paintings on mahogany panels
	Bust of a Woman (Ruth?)	1643	Oil on panel	72 × 59	Gemäldegalerie, Berlin	193	Possibly companion piece to 192. The darker parts of the costume were originally lighter and more colourful
	Sarah Waiting for Tobias	1643	Oil on canvas	81.2 × 67.9	National Gallery of Scotland, Edinburgh	194	
	Portrait of a Man with a Steel Gorget	1644	Oil on canvas	94.3 × 77.8	Metropolitan Museum of Art, New York	195	Cropped along the bottom edge
	Christ and the Woman Taken in Adultery	1644	Oil on panel	83.8 × 65.4	National Gallery, London	196	
	A Weeping Woman	c. 1644	Oil on panel	21.3 × 16.8	Detroit Institute of Arts	197	Oil sketch in preparation for 196
	Holy Family with Angels	1645	Oil on canvas	117 × 91	Hermitage Museum, Saint Petersburg	198	Strips of canvas of considerable width are missing on the side and top edges
	Self-portrait with Beret and Red Cloak	c. 1645/1648	Oil on panel	73.5 × 59.6	Staatliche Kunsthalle Karlsruhe	199	The size of this painting has been altered several times, as has its format (from rectangular to oval to rectangular to oval again)
	Girl Leaning on a Stone Window Sill	1645	Oil on canvas	81.6 × 66	Dulwich Picture Gallery, London	200	
	Tobit and Anna	1645	Oil on panel	20 × 27	Gemäldegalerie, Berlin	201	
	Joseph's Dream in the Stable at Bethlehem	1645	Oil on panel	20.7 × 27.8	Gemäldegalerie, Berlin	202	
	Old Man with Fur Coat	1645	Oil on panel	110 × 82	Gemäldegalerie, Berlin	203	The painting was probably cropped on all sides. It may well have had the same size as 204
	Old Man with a Stick	1645	Oil on canvas	128 × 112	Museu Calouste Gulbenkian, Lisbon	204	
	Landscape with a Castle	1645	Oil on panel	44.5 × 70	Musée du Louvre, Paris	205	Unfinished
	The Mill	c. 1645	Oil on canvas	87.6 × 105.6	National Gallery of Art, Washington	206	In the painting in its present state the mill is tilted forward
	Winter Landscape	1646	Oil on panel	17 × 23	Schloss Wilhelmshöhe, Kassel	207	
	Abraham Serving the Three Angels	1646	Oil on panel	16 × 21	Private Collection	208	
	The Holy Family with Painted Frame and Curtain	1646	Oil on panel	46.8 × 68.4	Schloss Wilhelmshöhe, Kassel	209	Rembrandt or pupil. The painting is covered by a layer of yellowed varnish
	The Prophetess Anna in the Temple	1650 or c. 1646	Oil on panel	40.5 × 31.5	National Gallery of Scotland, Edinburgh	210	The painting is covered by a layer of yellowed varnish
	The Nativity	1646	Oil on canvas	92 × 71	Alte Pinakothek, Munich	211a	Part of the Passion series for Frederik Hendrik. 211b. Studio copy after a lost Circumcision (which was part of the Passion series for Frederik Hendrik), in or after 1646. Braunschweig, Herzog Anton Ulrich Museum
	Saul and David	c. 1645 and c. 1652	Oil on canvas	130 × 164.5	Mauritshuis, The Hague	212	The painting originally was considerable larger. A vertical strip, wide c. 20 cm is missing to the left of David’s harp. Along the bottom the painting was c. 18 cm larger. The top right square piece of canvas above David was replaced by a fragment of a seventeenth-century painting and overpainted
	Susanna and the Elders	c. 1638–1647	Oil on panel	76.6 × 92.8	Gemäldegalerie, Berlin	213	The painting is covered by a layer of yellowed varnish
	Nocturnal Landscape with the Holy Family	1647	Oil on panel	33.8 × 47.8	National Gallery of Ireland, Dublin	214	
	Preparatory Oil Sketch for the Etched Portrait of Dr Ephraim Bueno	c. 1647	Oil on panel	19 × 15	Rijksmuseum Amsterdam	215	
	Portrait of a Man Reading by Candlelight	1648	Oil on canvas	66.5 × 58	Clark Art Institute, Williamstown	216	
	Oil Study of Christ	c. 1648	Oil on panel	25 × 20	Gemäldegalerie, Berlin	217a	The only surviving copy of Head of Christ by the master's hand.
	Oil Study of Christ	1648	Oil on panel	25.5 × 20.1	Louvre Abu Dhabi, United Arab Emirates	217b	Rembrandt or workshop. Companion piece to 217a
	The Supper at Emmaus	1648	Oil on panel	68 × 65	Musée du Louvre, Paris	218	The panel, whose grain runs horizontally, may have extended further on the left where there could have been a window
	Christ Appearing to Mary Magdalene, ‘Noli me tangere’	1650 or slightly later	Oil on canvas	65 × 79	Herzog Anton Ulrich Museum, Braunschweig	219	The painting is in an extremely bad condition and shows disturbing blanching in places
	Girl at a Window	1651	Oil on canvas	78 × 63	Nationalmuseum, Stockholm	220	
	An Old Man in an Armchair	1652	Oil on canvas	111 × 88	National Gallery, London	221	Probably by Rembrandt
	An Old Man in Fanciful Costume	1651	Oil on canvas	78.5 × 67.5	Chatsworth House	222	The painting was originally taller. It is covered by a disturbing layer of yellowed varnish
	Portrait of Hendrickje Stoffels	c. 1652	Oil on canvas	103.3 × 86.5	National Gallery, London	223	
	The So-called Large Vienna Self-portrait with Beret	1652	Oil on canvas	112.1 × 81	Kunsthistorisches Museum, Vienna	224	The painting has been cropped both at top left and bottom. It is covered by a disturbing layer of yellowed varnish
	Portrait of a Man	c. 1651	Oil on canvas	92.5 × 73.5	Faringdon Collection, Oxfordshire	225	
	Portrait of Nicolaes Bruyningh	1652	Oil on canvas	106.8 × 91.5	Schloss Wilhelmshöhe, Kassel	226	The painting is covered by a layer of yellowed varnish
	Aristotle with a Bust of Homer	1653	Oil on canvas	141.8 × 134.4	Metropolitan Museum of Art, New York	228	The painting was larger at both top and bottom. The original proportions of the canvas were 4:3
	A Woman Wading in a Pool (Callisto in the Wilderness)	1654	Oil on panel	61.8 × 47	National Gallery, London	229	
	Oil Study of an Old Man with a Red Hat	c. 1654	Oil on canvas	52.4 × 37	Gemäldegalerie, Berlin	230	The painting is covered by a disturbing layer of darkened varnish
	Bathsheba at her Toilet	1654	Oil on canvas	142 × 142	Musée du Louvre, Paris	231	The canvas was originally considerably higher and wider at the left. Strips are missing from the bottom and right. In the process of changing the format of the painting the remaining part with the figures was slightly tilted to the left
	Woman at an Open Half-door	c. 1654	Oil on canvas	88.5 × 67	Gemäldegalerie, Berlin	232	The painting is covered by a disturbing layer of yellowed varnish
	Portrait of Jan Six	1654	Oil on canvas	112 × 102	Six Foundation, Amsterdam	233	
	The Standard-Bearer (Floris Soop)	1654	Oil on canvas	138 × 113	Metropolitan Museum of Art, New York	234	
	Self-portrait	1654	Oil on canvas	72 × 58.5	Schloss Wilhelmshöhe, Kassel	235a	Companion piece to 235b
	Portrait of Hendrickje Stoffels	c. 1654	Oil on canvas	72 × 60	Musée du Louvre, Paris	235b	Companion piece to 235a
	The Polish Rider	c. 1655	Oil on canvas	116.8 × 134.9	Frick Collection, New York	236	Partly unfinished, locally completed by later hand. At least 8–10 cm of the canvas are missing at the right. Along the bottom a strip of c. 10 cm was lost at some stage and subsequently replaced by a reconstruction painted by the restorer William Suhr
	Joseph Accused by Potiphar’s Wife	1655	Oil on canvas	110 × 87	Gemäldegalerie, Berlin	237	With possible additions by another hand. The figure of Joseph and the left part of the pillow seem to have been added by a later hand on the basis of a rough underpainting by Rembrandt
	Oil Sketch of an Old Man	c. 1655	Oil on panel	23 × 18	Private collection	238	
	Man in Armour	c. 1655	Oil on canvas	137.5 × 104.5	Kelvingrove Art Gallery and Museum, Glasgow	239	The canvas has been enlarged on all four sides
	Slaughtered Ox	1655	Oil on panel	95.5 × 69	Musée du Louvre, Paris	240	
	Old Woman Reading (Study in Lighting Effects)	1655	Oil on canvas	79 × 65	Drumlanrig Castle, Thornhill	241	
	Titus at a Desk	1655(?)	Oil on canvas	77 × 63	Museum Boijmans Van Beuningen, Rotterdam	242	
	Unfinished Portrait of a Boy	c. 1656	Oil on canvas	65 × 56	Norton Simon Museum, Pasadena	243	
	Man with Beret and Tabard (a Falconer?)	1656	Oil on canvas	115 × 88.3	Toledo Museum of Art	244	The painting must originally have extended considerably further to the right
	Jacob Blessing the Sons of Joseph	1656	Oil on canvas	175 × 210.5	Schloss Wilhelmshöhe, Kassel	245	
	The Anatomy Lesson of Dr. Jan Deyman	1656	Oil on canvas	100 × 134	Amsterdam Museum	246	Fragment that survived a fire. Blisters and traces of other fire-damage are still visible along the upper edge and in the hands of the dissector, Dr Deyman
	Young Man Seated at a Table	c. 1656	Oil on canvas	109.9 × 89.5	National Gallery of Art, Washington	247	
	Portrait of a Gentleman with a Pair of Gloves	c. 1656	Oil on canvas	99.5 × 82.5	National Gallery of Art, Washington	248a	Companion piece to 248b. The painting (and its companion piece) seems to be a fragment of a full-size portrait
	Portrait of a Lady with an Ostrich Feather Fan	c. 1656	Oil on canvas	99.5 × 83	National Gallery of Art, Washington	248b	Companion piece to 248a
	Portrait of a Man, possibly Arnout Tholincx	1656	Oil on canvas	76 × 63	Musée Jacquemart-André, Paris	249	
	Portrait of poet Jeremias de Decker	1656	Oil on panel	71 × 56	Hermitage Museum, Saint Petersburg	250	
	Venus and Cupid	c. 1657	Oil on canvas	110 × 88	Musée du Louvre, Paris	251	Possibly part of a tripartite series with 252 and 253. The canvas has been cropped on all sides
	Juno	c. 1657–1665	Oil on canvas	127 × 106	Hammer Museum, Los Angeles	252	Possibly part of a tripartite series with 251 and 253
	Pallas Athene	c. 1657	Oil on canvas	118 × 91	Museu Calouste Gulbenkian, Lisbon	253	Rembrandt and pupil. Possibly part of a tripartite series with 251 and 252. The canvas has been reduced at the left and bottom
	The Apostle Paul at his Writing Desk	1657	Oil on canvas	129 × 102	National Gallery of Art, Washington	254	Rembrandt and workshop
	The Apostle Bartholomew	1657	Oil on canvas	122.7 × 99.5	Timken Museum of Art, San Diego	255	
	The So-called Small Vienna Self-portrait	c. 1657	Oil on panel	48.9 × 40.2	Kunsthistorisches Museum, Vienna	256	Serious overcleaning and related overpaintings are evident in the shaded part of the face and in the costume. The painting appears to be a fragment of a considerably larger self-portrait
	Portrait of Titus van Rijn	1657	Oil on canvas	67.3 × 55.2	Wallace Collection, London	257	The figure may have been placed before a larger, rather lively background
	Portrait of Catharina Hooghsaet	1657	Oil on canvas	123.5 × 95	National Museum, Cardiff	258	
	Portrait of an Unknown Scholar (also known as ‘The Auctioneer’)	1658	Oil on canvas	108 × 85	Metropolitan Museum of Art, New York	259	
	Preparatory Oil Sketch for the Etched Portrait of Lieven Willemsz van Coppenol	In or before 1658	Oil on panel	35.6 × 28	Metropolitan Museum of Art, New York	260	See etching B283
	Portrait of a Man with Arms Akimbo	1658	Oil on canvas	107.4 × 87	Agnes Etherington Art Centre, Kingston	261	
	The Risen Christ	c. 1658	Oil on canvas	81 × 64	Alte Pinakothek, Munich	262	The painting was not originally oval
	Portrait of Dirck van Os	c. 1658	Oil on canvas	113.5 × 88.7	Joslyn Art Museum, Omaha	263	
	Self-portrait	1658	Oil on canvas	131 × 102	Frick Collection, New York	264	
	Philemon and Baucis	1658	Oil, transferred from panel to gauze and then stuck on a new panel	54.5 × 68.5	National Gallery of Art, Washington	265	
	Tobit and Anna	1659	Oil on canvas	41.8 × 54.6	Museum Boijmans Van Beuningen, Rotterdam	266	
	Moses Smashes the Stone Tablets with the Covenant	1659	Oil on canvas	168.5 × 136.5	Gemäldegalerie, Berlin	267	Unfinished
	Jacob Wrestling with the Angel	c. 1659	Oil on canvas	137 × 116	Gemäldegalerie, Berlin	268	The painting must have been cropped on all sides. A piece of the same canvas bearing Rembrandt’s signature is stuck on the lower right corner. Many of the contours have been strengthened by a later hand
	Posthumous Portrait of Saskia van Uylenburgh as Flora	c. 1660	Oil on canvas	100 × 91.8	Metropolitan Museum of Art, New York	269	Rembrandt (and workshop?)
	Portrait of a Man as the Apostle Paul	1659	Oil on canvas	102 × 85.5	National Gallery, London	270	
	Oil Sketch for 272	c. 1659	Oil on canvas	68.5 × 55.5	Statens Museum for Kunst, Copenhagen	271	
	The Knight with the Falcon	1660s	Oil on canvas	98.5 × 79	Gothenburg Museum of Art	272	
	Self-portrait	1657/1659	Oil on canvas	50 × 42.5	National Gallery of Scotland, Edinburgh	273	
	Self Portrait with Beret and Turned-Up Collar	1659	Oil on canvas	84.4 × 66	National Gallery of Art, Washington	274	
	Self-portrait	c. 1659	Oil on canvas	30.7 × 24.3	Musée Granet, Aix-en-Provence	275	Unfinished
	Lighting Study with an Old Man as a Model	1659	Oil on panel	38.1 × 26.8	Agnes Etherington Art Centre, Kingston	276	
	Lighting Study with Hendrickje Stoffels in a Silk Gown as a Model	c. 1659	Oil on panel	72.5 × 51.5	Städel, Frankfurt am Main	277	A narrow strip is missing along the left side, a consequence of woodworm attack. The painting is covered with a yellowed varnish
	Hendrickje Stoffels	c. 1660	Oil on canvas	78.4 × 68.9	Metropolitan Museum of Art, New York	278	The painting is in a badly overcleaned and abraded condition
	Titus van Rijn as St Francis	c. 1660	Oil on canvas	79.5 × 67.5	Rijksmuseum Amsterdam	279	
	A Smiling Young Man (Titus)	1660	Oil on canvas	81.5 × 78.5	Baltimore Museum of Art	280	
	Self-portrait at an Easel	1660	Oil on canvas	110.9 × 90.6	Musée du Louvre, Paris	281	
	Rembrandt: Self Portrait	1660	Oil on canvas	81 × 67.6	Metropolitan Museum of Art, New York	282	
	Assuerus, Haman, and Esther	Between c. 1655 and 1665	Oil on canvas	71.5 × 93	Pushkin Museum, Moscow	283	
	The Denial of Peter	1660	Oil on canvas	154 × 169	Dordrechts Museum, Dordrecht (on loan from Rijksmuseum Amsterdam)	284	The canvas was reduced on the right. 286 was painted on part of the trimmed piece
	Lighting Study of an Old Man in Profile	c. 1661	Oil on panel	24.8 × 19.1	Agnes Etherington Art Centre, Kingston	285	Probably painted in preparation for 286
	The Circumcision in the Stable	1661	Oil on canvas	56.5 × 75	National Gallery of Art, Washington	286	
	The Virgin of Sorrow	1661	Oil on canvas	107 × 81	Musée départemental d'Art ancien et contemporain, Epinal	287	
	Titus Posing for a Study of an Angel	c. 1661	Oil on panel	40.6 × 34.9	Detroit Institute of Arts	288	Possibly painted in preparation for 289
	Saint Matthew and the Angel	1661	Oil on canvas	96 × 81	Musée du Louvre, Paris	289	Part of a series with 290–294
	The Apostle Bartholomew	1661	Oil on canvas	87.5 × 75	J. Paul Getty Museum, Los Angeles	290	Part of a series with 289, 291–294
	The Apostle Simon	1661	Oil on canvas	98.5 × 79	Kunsthaus Zürich	291	Part of a series with 289, 290 and 292–294
	The Apostle James the Greater	1661	Oil on canvas	92.1 × 74.9	Whereabouts unknown	292	Part of a series with 289–291 and 293, 294
	The Apostle James the Less, or Christ with a Staff	1661	Oil on canvas	94.5 × 81.5	Metropolitan Museum of Art, New York	293	Part of a series with 289–292 and 294
	Self-portrait as the Apostle Paul	1661	Oil on canvas	93.2 × 79.1	Rijksmuseum Amsterdam	294	Part of a series with 289–293
	Two Moors	1661	Oil on canvas	77.8 × 64.5	Mauritshuis, The Hague	295	The paint surface is severely worn. The painting has been cropped to the right and bottom
	The Small Margaretha de Geer	1661	Oil on canvas	73.5 × 60.7	National Gallery, London	296	Sketch for 297b
	Portrait of Jacob Trip	c. 1661	Oil on canvas	130.5 × 97	National Gallery, London	297a	Companion piece to 297b
	Portrait of Margaretha de Geer	c. 1661	Oil on canvas	130.5 × 97	National Gallery, London	297b	Companion piece to 297a
	The Conspiracy of the Batavians under Claudius Civilis	c. 1661–1662	Oil on canvas	196 × 309	Nationalmuseum, Stockholm	298	Fragment
	Portrait of the Syndics of the Amsterdam Clothmakers’ Guild, known as the ‘Staalmeesters’	1662	Oil on canvas	191.5 × 279	Rijksmuseum Amsterdam	299	
	Portrait of a Young Man	c. 1662	Oil on canvas	80 × 64.7	Nelson-Atkins Museum of Art, Kansas City	300	
	Homer Dictating his Verses	1663	Oil on canvas	108 × 82.4	Mauritshuis, The Hague	301	Made as part of a tripartite series with 228 and a lost Alexander the Great. In the right lower corner part of the manuscript, fingertips with pen and rim of the inkwell of a scribe
	Self-portrait as the Laughing Zeuxis while Painting an Old Woman	1663	Oil on canvas	82.5 × 65	Wallraf-Richartz Museum, Cologne	302	Cropped on all four sides; the upper left and right corners are later additions
	Equestrian Portrait of Frederick Rihel	1663	Oil on canvas	294.5 × 241	National Gallery, London	303	Rembrandt and workshop. The horse is painted by a different painter, possibly Titus van Rijn
	Bust of a Bearded Young Man with a Skullcap	1663	Oil on canvas	65.8 × 57.5	Kimbell Art Museum, Fort Worth	304	
	Portrait of a Woman with a Lapdog	c. 1665	Oil on canvas	81 × 64	Art Gallery of Ontario, Toronto	305	The originally more differentiated background is overpainted with black
	Old Man in an Armchair, possibly a portrait of Jan Amos Comenius	c. 1665	Oil on canvas	104 × 86	Uffizi, Florence	306	Covered with remnants of darkened varnish
	Titus Reading (study in direct and reflected light)	c. 1660/1665	Oil on canvas	70.5 × 64	Kunsthistorisches Museum, Vienna	307	
	Portrait of Gerard de Lairesse	1665	Oil on canvas	112 × 87	Metropolitan Museum of Art, New York	308	
	Portrait of Jan Boursse, Sitting by a Stove	c. 1666	Oil on panel	47 × 40.5	Museum Oskar Reinhart ‘Am Römerholz’, Winterthur	309	Probably painted in preparation of an unrealized etched portrait. The painting has suffered heavily from overcleaning and wear and is covered with a thick layer of yellowed varnish
	A Presumed Sketch for the Male Sitter in the ‘Jewish Bride’	mid-1660s	Oil on panel	38.4 × 31.1	Metropolitan Museum of Art, New York	310	
	Portrait of a Man with a Magnifying Glass, possibly Pieter Haaringh	1665	Oil on canvas	91.4 × 74.3	Metropolitan Museum of Art, New York	311a	Companion piece to 311b
	Portrait of a Woman with a Carnation, possibly Lysbet Jansdr Delft	1665	Oil on canvas	92.1 × 74.6	Metropolitan Museum of Art, New York	311b	Companion piece to 311a
	‘Portrait Historié’ of a Couple as Isaac and Rebecca (known as ‘The Jewish Bride’)	c. 1665	Oil on canvas	121.5 × 166.5	Rijksmuseum Amsterdam	312	Originally the painting was larger
	Family Portrait	c. 1665	Oil on canvas	126 × 167	Herzog Anton Ulrich Museum, Braunschweig	313	
	Lucretia	1666	Oil on canvas	111 × 95	Minneapolis Institute of Arts	314	Both hands have been (clumsily) overpainted by a later painter
	Portrait of a White-haired Man	1667	Oil on canvas	108.9 × 92.7	National Gallery of Victoria, Melbourne	315	
	Portrait of an Elderly Man Seated, possibly Pieter de la Tombe	1667	Oil on canvas	81.9 × 67.7	Mauritshuis, The Hague	316	
	Portrait of Titus van Rijn	1668	Oil on canvas	72 × 56	Musée du Louvre, Paris	317	Companion piece to 318?
	Portrait of a Young Woman, possibly Magdalena van Loo	1668	Oil on canvas	56 × 47	Montreal Museum of Fine Arts	318	Companion piece to 317? Cropped on all four sides
	Self Portrait with Two Circles	c. 1665/1669	Oil on canvas	114.3 × 94	Kenwood House, London	319	Unfinished
	The Return of the Prodigal Son	c. 1660/1665	Oil on canvas	262 × 206	Hermitage Museum, Saint Petersburg	320	Rembrandt and other hand(s). A 10 cm wide strip has been added or replaced along the right edge
	Self-Portrait at the Age of 63	1669	Oil on canvas	86 × 70.5	National Gallery, London	321	
	Self-portrait with Beret	1669	Oil on canvas	71 × 54	Uffizi, Florence	322	Strips of c. 15 cm may have been removed on all four sides as early as the seventeenth century to accommodate the painting in an assemblage of self-portraits owned by the Medici family. The painting is now almost hidden behind a strongly discoloured or tinted layer of varnish under which there also seem to be extensive overpaintings
	Self-portrait	1669	Oil on canvas	63.5 × 57.8	Mauritshuis, The Hague	323	A strip of c. 10 cm is missing from the bottom
	Simeon in the Temple	1669	Oil on canvas	98.5 × 79.5	Nationalmuseum, Stockholm	324	This painting remained unfinished in his studio after Rembrandt’s death. The woman (Mary?) was probably added later by another hand. Still later, the painting was so crudely treated that it is now a ruin

== See also ==
- List of etchings by Rembrandt
- List of drawings by Rembrandt
- Self-portraits by Rembrandt

== Sources ==
- A Corpus of Rembrandt Paintings I (1625–1631). Bruyn, J., Haak, B., Levie, S.H., van Thiel, P.J.J. 1982. ISBN 978-90-247-2614-1.
- A Corpus of Rembrandt Paintings II (1631–1634). Bruyn, J., Haak, B., Levie, S.H., van Thiel, P.J.J. 1986. ISBN 978-90-247-3339-2.
- A Corpus of Rembrandt Paintings III (1635–1642). Bruyn, J., Haak, B., Levie, S.H., van Thiel, P.J.J., van de Wetering, E. (Ed.). 1990. ISBN 978-90-247-3781-9.
- A Corpus of Rembrandt Paintings IV (Self-Portraits). van de Wetering, Ernst (Ed.). Springer. 2005. ISBN 978-1-4020-3280-6.
- A Corpus of Rembrandt Paintings V (The Small-Scale History Paintings). van de Wetering, Ernst (Ed.). Springer. 2010. ISBN 978-1-4020-4607-0.
- A Corpus of Rembrandt Paintings VI: Rembrandt’s Paintings Revisited – A Complete Survey. Ernst van de Wetering. Springer. 2014. ISBN 978-9-4017-9173-1.
