= Rembrandt Laughing =

Painting by Rembrandt, c. 1628

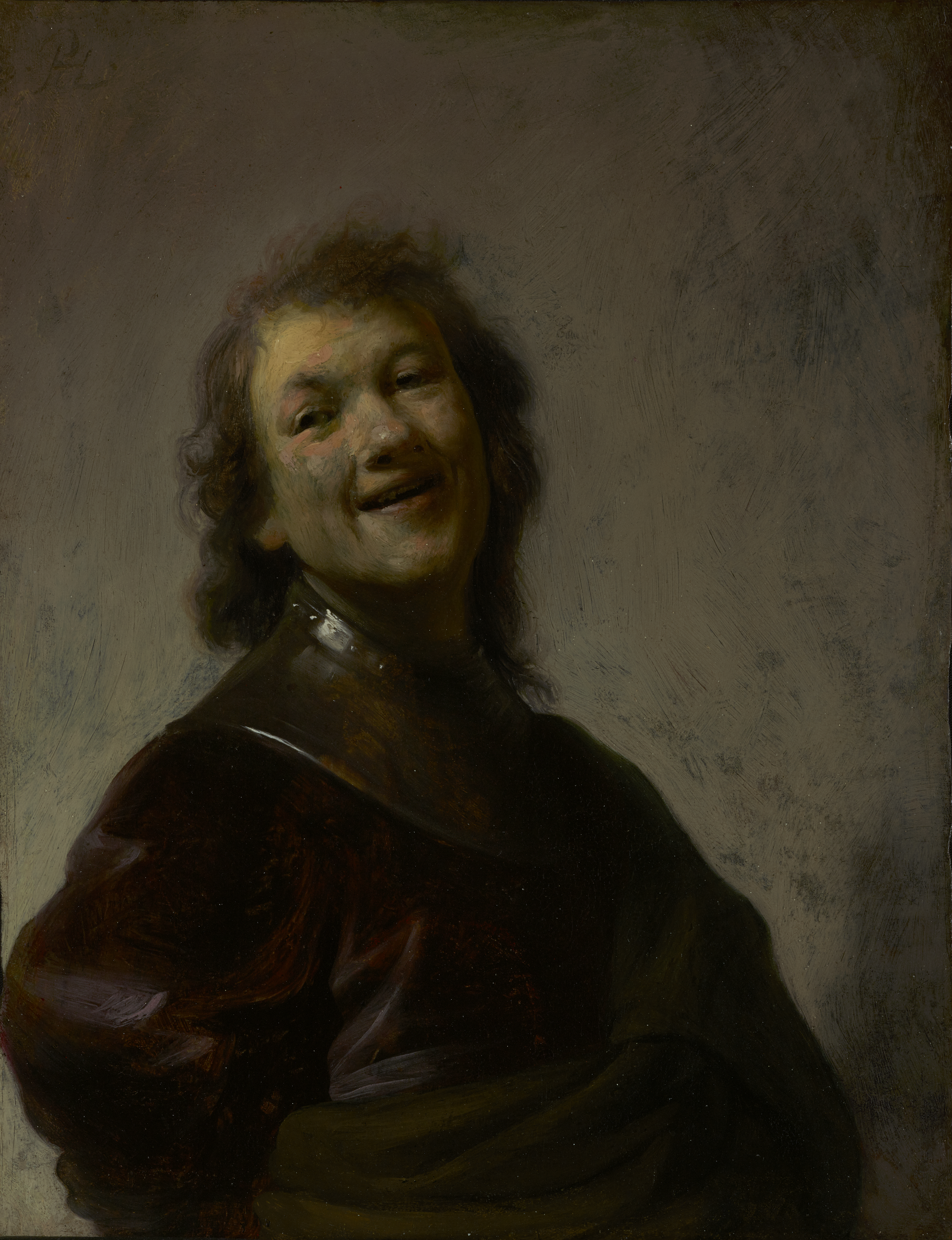
- Artist: Rembrandt van Rijn
- Year: c. 1628
- Catalogue: 2013.60
- Type: Oil on copper
- Dimensions: 22.2 cm × 17.1 cm (8.7 in × 6.7 in)
- Location: J. Paul Getty Museum, Los Angeles

Rembrandt Laughing is a c. 1628 oil on copper painting by the Dutch painter Rembrandt van Rijn. It is an elaborate study of a laughing face, a tronie, and, since it represents the painter himself, one of over 40 self-portraits by Rembrandt, probably the earliest elaborate one. The painting, which was only recently discovered, is now in the J. Paul Getty Museum, California.

== Description ==
The painting shows a laughing man, bareheaded, with his head tilted back, dressed in a deep purple robe, surrounded by a rougher brown woolen cape. He also wears a polished metal gorget, a piece of armor which is protecting the throat. The man's face has the features of the young Rembrandt, shown as a laughing soldier. His hair is long, "fluffy", light and dark blond, as in other Rembrandt portraits of the period (e.g. Self-Portrait in a Gorget in Nuremberg). He is looking directly at the viewer. The brushwork is sure, sensitive, spontaneous and bold, sometimes precise, sometimes broad and loose, and it clearly reveals the hand of a genius, who precisely knows how to best capture the transitory reaction of laughing.

== History of the painting ==
Similar to many other Dutch paintings of the 17th century, the early stage of this painting's life in Holland, after it left Rembrandt's Leiden studio in which it was created, is not known. Still, the painting was previously known from the late 18th, or, more probably, early 19th century print by Flemish engraver Lambertus Antonius Claessens, who reproduced it as a work by Frans Hals.

In the 18th or 19th century it was owned by a French collector who wrote an inscription on its back: "Democrite Philosophe [?] son [?] profonde meditation des (de?) [?] faiblesses (?) [?] tous ensemble. Nous concevons mille différ? nous formons mille projets que nous ne (?) pouvons executer. C?est une espece de folie r[?] ce Philosophe Je (se?) ris." Despite that explanation, the painting is probably not representing Rembrandt as the laughing philosopher Democritus, because in the Dutch painting of the period, he is regularly shown with a globe. After that, the painting was lost, and its whereabouts unknown.

Thanks to the Claessen's print, it was mentioned in 1933 in Kurt Bauch's book on Rembrandt, and even before that, in Ernst Wilhelm Moes's book on Dutch painting.

In 2007, it suddenly appeared in an auction in Gloucestershire, England, but just as the work of "a follower of Rembrandt". The reason was that although photos of the painting had been emailed to the experts at the Rijksmuseum in Amsterdam before the sale, "their response was pretty dismissive", as auctioneer Philip Allwood has said. So the painting was estimated at just £1000-1500, but was sold for £2.2 m.

In 2013 the painting was sold to the Getty Museum in California for £16.5m

== Attribution ==
Although from the very first sight it is clear that this painting is a masterpiece, it was still necessary to prove that it was painted by Rembrandt himself. To that end Ernst van de Wetering, professor emeritus at the University of Amsterdam and Chair of the Rembrandt Research Project undertook extensive research, and published his results in the "Kroniek van het Rembrandthuis" in 2007. His conclusion that the painting offered at the auction in Gloucestershire is a genuine Rembrandt was argued through a variety of evidence.

The first piece of evidence was Rembrandt's monogram in the corner of the painting. The RHL monogram (meaning: Rembrandt Harmenszoon Leidensis, i.e.: Rembrandt, son of Harmen from Leiden) is a particular type of signature that Rembrandt used only in 1628 and possibly in late 1627 or early 1629. The fact that the letters of the monogram were written in the wet paint of the surface is of major importance for dating the painting. Still, the problem was that Rembrandt sometimes signed his pupils' paintings, as a kind of guarantee that they had come from his studio.

The size and nature of the copper sheet on which the painting was made is evidence, since Rembrandt also used this standard size for his etchings usually dated to 1628, such as St Peter and St John at the Temple Gate.

The third piece of evidence came after analysis of the painting with electron emission radiography. It showed that the laughing figure was painted on top of an earlier (probably unfinished) painting very similar to the history pieces painted by Rembrandt at that time, such as David with the Head of Goliath before Saul, now in Basel.

Rembrandt's interest in rendering effects, well known from his famous etchings of the same period, is also proof of attribution to Rembrandt.

And lastly, a possible free copy of this painting, made by Rembrandt's pupil or a follower, now probably in the collection of Edmond de Rothschild, might also be proof of attribution to Rembrandt of the Gloucestershire tronie.

== See also ==
- Self-portraiture
- Self-portraits by Rembrandt
- List of paintings by Rembrandt

== Bibliography ==
- Turner 2000 – Turner, Jane: From Rembrandt to Vermeer / 17th-Century Dutch Artists (Grove Dictionary of Art), New York, 2000
- Wetering 2007 – Wetering, Ernest van de: Rembrandt Laughing, c. 1628 - a painting resurfaces, Kronik van het Rembrandthuis, Amsterdam, 2007, p. 18-40
- Capon 2008 - Capon, Alex: Rembrandt portrait sold in Cotswolds now authenticated, 2008.
- Jenkins 2013 - Jenkins, Tiffany: Let Rembrandt's self-portrait leave Britain, July 17, 2013
- Getty 2021 - The J. Paul Getty Museum: Rembrandt Laughing
