= Moses Breaking the Tablets of the Law =

1659 painting by Rembrandt

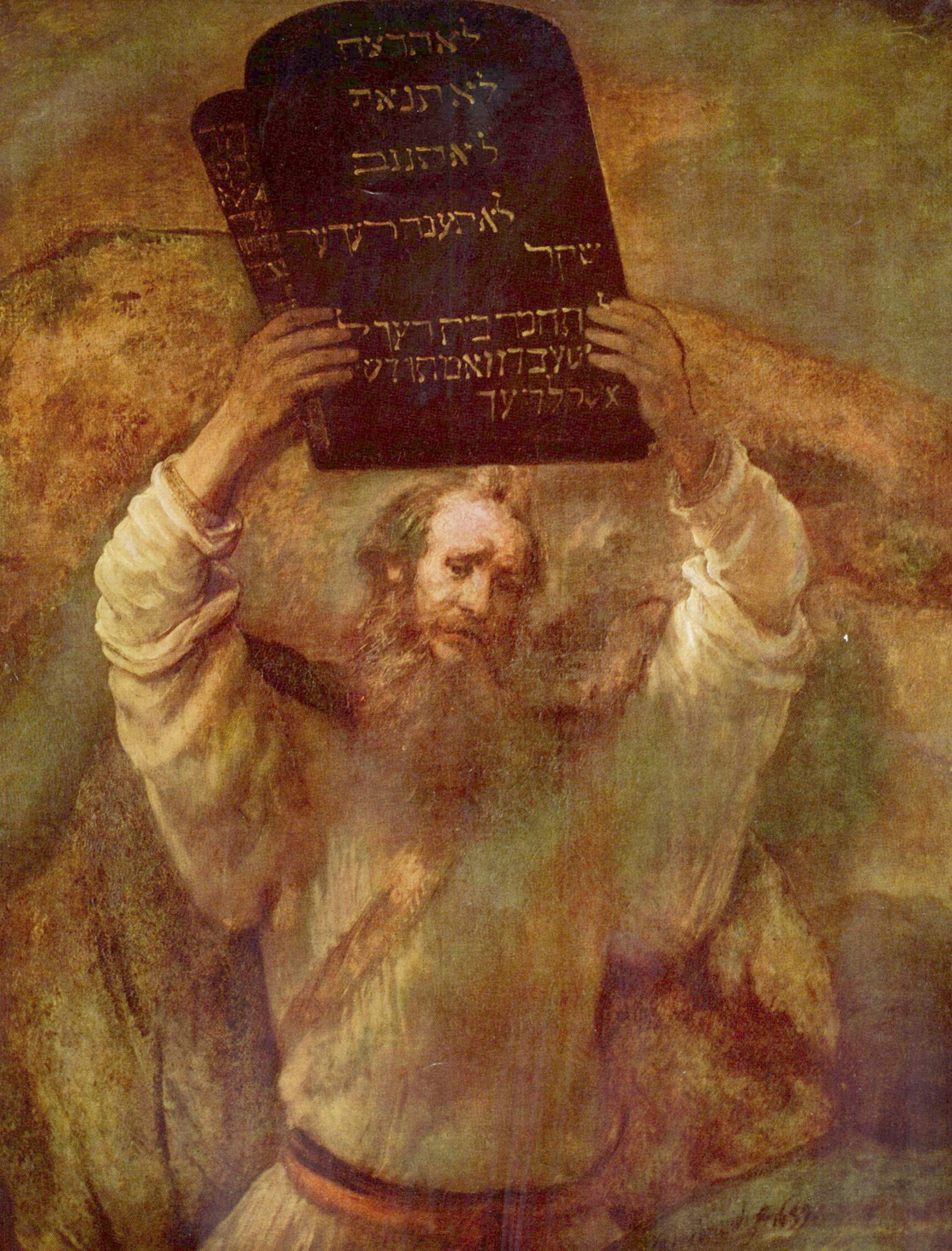
- Artist: Rembrandt
- Year: 1659
- Medium: Oil on canvas
- Dimensions: 168.5 cm × 136.5 cm (66.3 in × 53.7 in)
- Location: Gemäldegalerie; Berlin

Moses Breaking the Tablets of the Law is a 1659 oil-on-canvas painting of the prophet Moses by the Dutch artist Rembrandt. It depicts Moses about to break the original two stone tablets inscribed with the Ten Commandments. It is now in the Gemäldegalerie, Berlin.

== See also ==
- List of paintings by Rembrandt

== Bibliography ==
- Kristin Bahre u. a. (Hrsg.): Rembrandt. Genie auf der Suche. DuMont Literatur und Kunst, Köln 2006. ISBN 3-8321-7694-2
- Christian Tümpel: Rembrandt. Rowohlt Taschenbuch Verlag, Reinbek 2006. ISBN 3-499-50691-2.
- Shalom Sabar, “Between Calvinists and Jews: Hebrew Script in Rembrandt’s Art,” in Mitchell B. Merback, ed., Beyond the Yellow Badge: Anti-Judaism and Antisemitism in Medieval and Early European Modern Visual Culture (Leiden: Brill, 2008), 371-404, 559-573.
