= The Raising of Lazarus (Rembrandt) =

Painting by Rembrandt

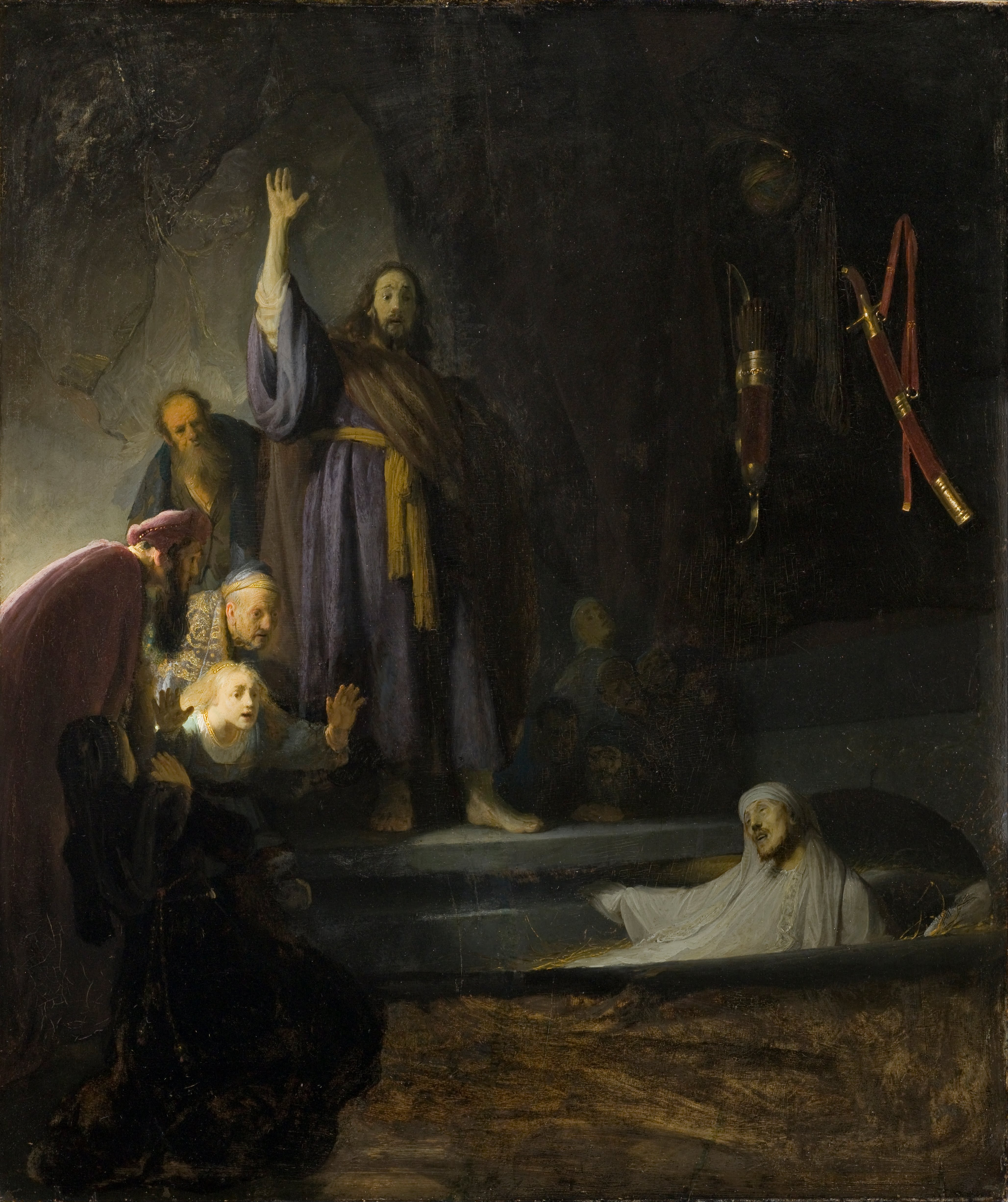
The Raising of Lazarus, Rembrandt. Oil on panel. 37 15/16 in × 32 in (96.36 × 81.28 cm). c. 1630–1632. Los Angeles County Museum of Art

The Raising of Lazarus is an oil-on-panel painting by the Dutch artist Rembrandt from early in his career; it was probably painted between 1630 and 1632. The work depicts the Raising of Lazarus as told in the Gospel of John, Chapter 11. It is in the collection of the Los Angeles County Museum of Art.

== Imagery ==
The painting shows the moment Lazarus re-awakens from death and rises from his tomb as Christ calls him. Lazarus is in the darker half of the painting while the figures at left are far more illuminated than he. Mary and those assembled look on in amazement as Lazarus comes to life. The painting depicts a parable of spiritual life, the miracle of the hardened sinner receiving first grace (sorrow for sins committed in order to seek penitence and redemption). Rembrandt used chiaroscuro (contrasts of light and dark) in this painting, with the dark interior of the burial cave and the limited torchlight focusing the attention of the viewer and giving the figures impact. This is one of relatively few religious subjects from the New Testament that Rembrandt painted, though there are many such prints.

== History ==
Rembrandt painted The Raising of Lazarus early in his career, while he was still in Leiden, and not long after his apprenticeship under Pieter Lastman, whose influence is clear. Rembrandt made two etchings on the same subject but with differing compositions, one in approximately 1632 and another in 1642 (see gallery below). The 1632 etching shows a different point of view while the 1642 etching shows different figures in the cave. The 1642 etching also depicts Christ as more of a healer, rather than the enchanter of this work. (Sister Wendy Beckett opines that Jesus is portrayed in this work as a weary magician rather than a triumphant savior.) The subject of this painting may draw on an undated Jan Lievens etching of the same name. Lievens and Rembrandt were friends and probably worked together. The composition of the painting may derive from a drawing by Rembrandt from the same time as the Burial of Christ. Rembrandt would most closely imitate Raising of Lazarus with his 1635/1639 painting The Resurrection. The placement of the figures is similar and a study of drawings indicates that the latter was developed from the former.

== Provenance ==
Raising of Lazarus was owned by Rembrandt for most of his life; it was sold in his bankruptcy sale in 1656. It was inventoried as being hung in Rembrandt's anteroom. The painting passed through various owners in Europe until it was bought by Howard F. Ahmanson, Sr. in 1959 and then donated to the LA County Museum of Art.

== Gallery ==
Rembrandt made drawings and etchings on the same theme.

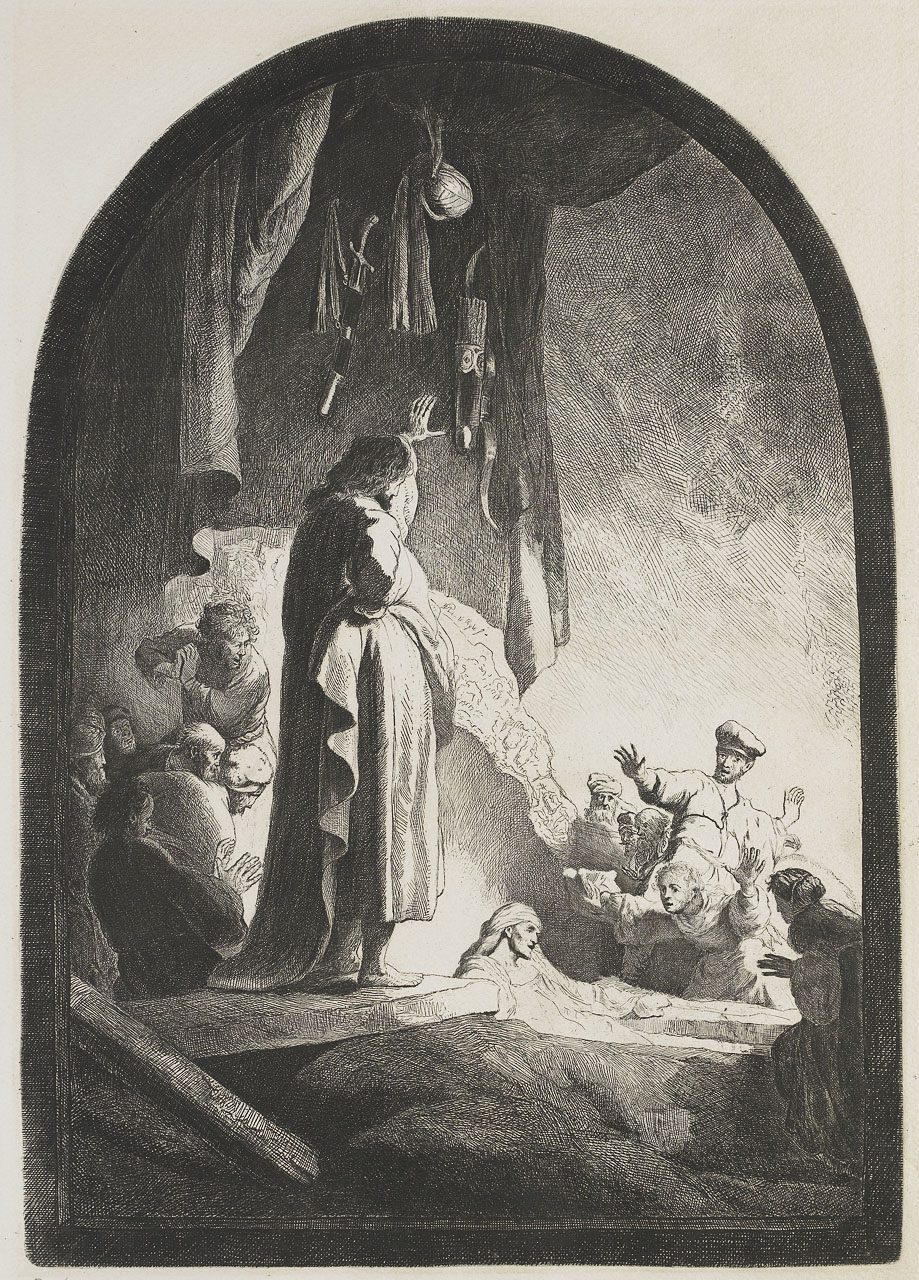
Etching, c. 1632

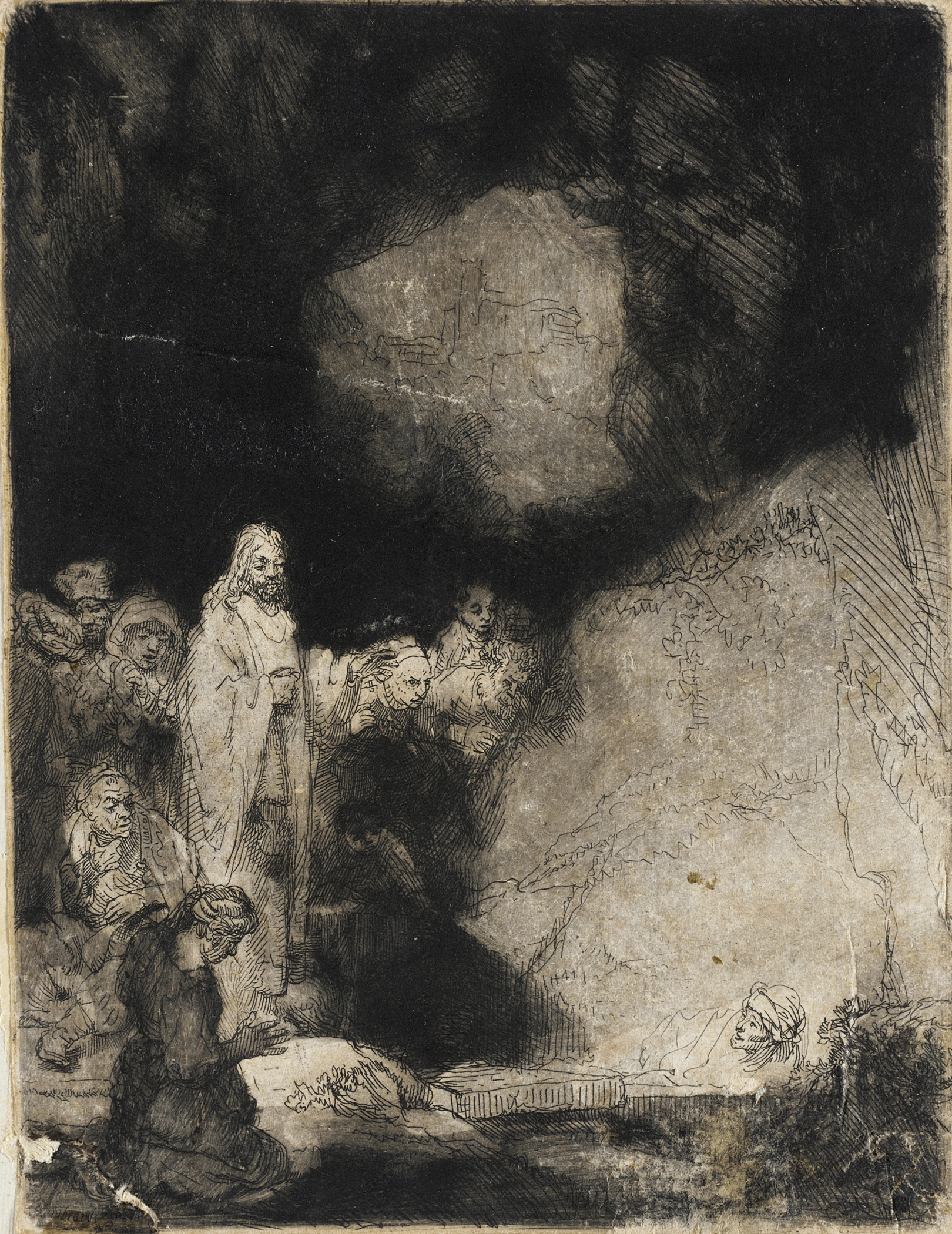
Etching, 1642

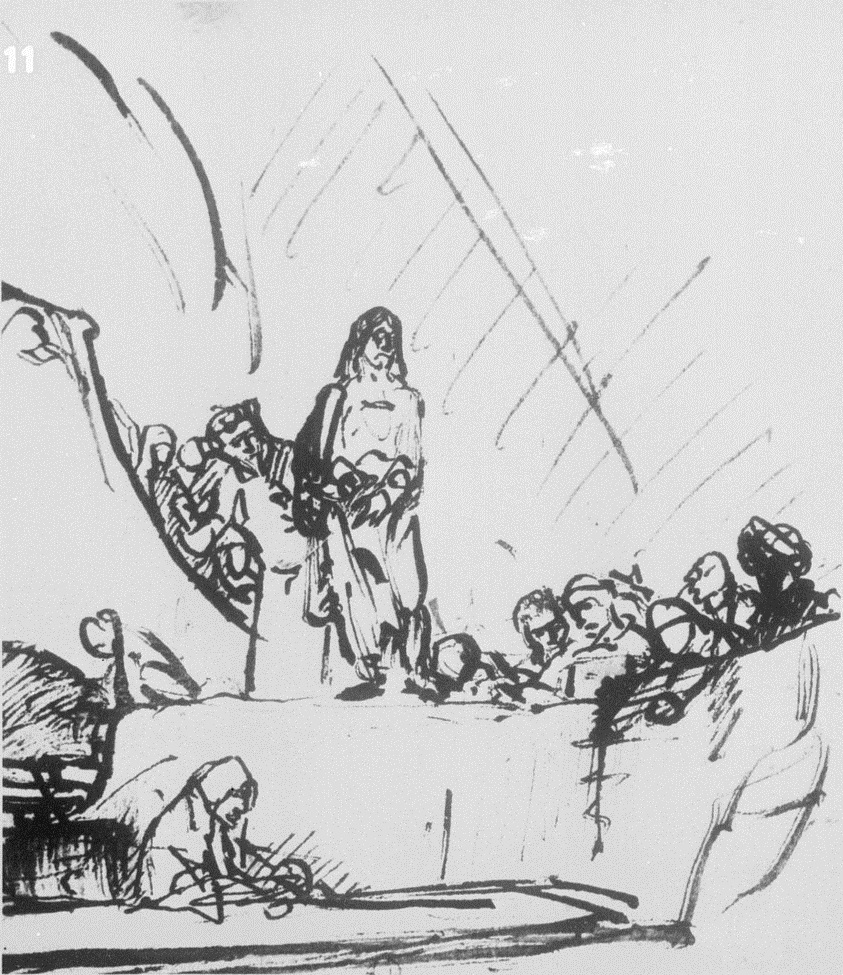
Drawing, 1642

== See also ==
- List of paintings by Rembrandt
