= Christ on the Cross (Rembrandt) =

Painting by Rembrandt

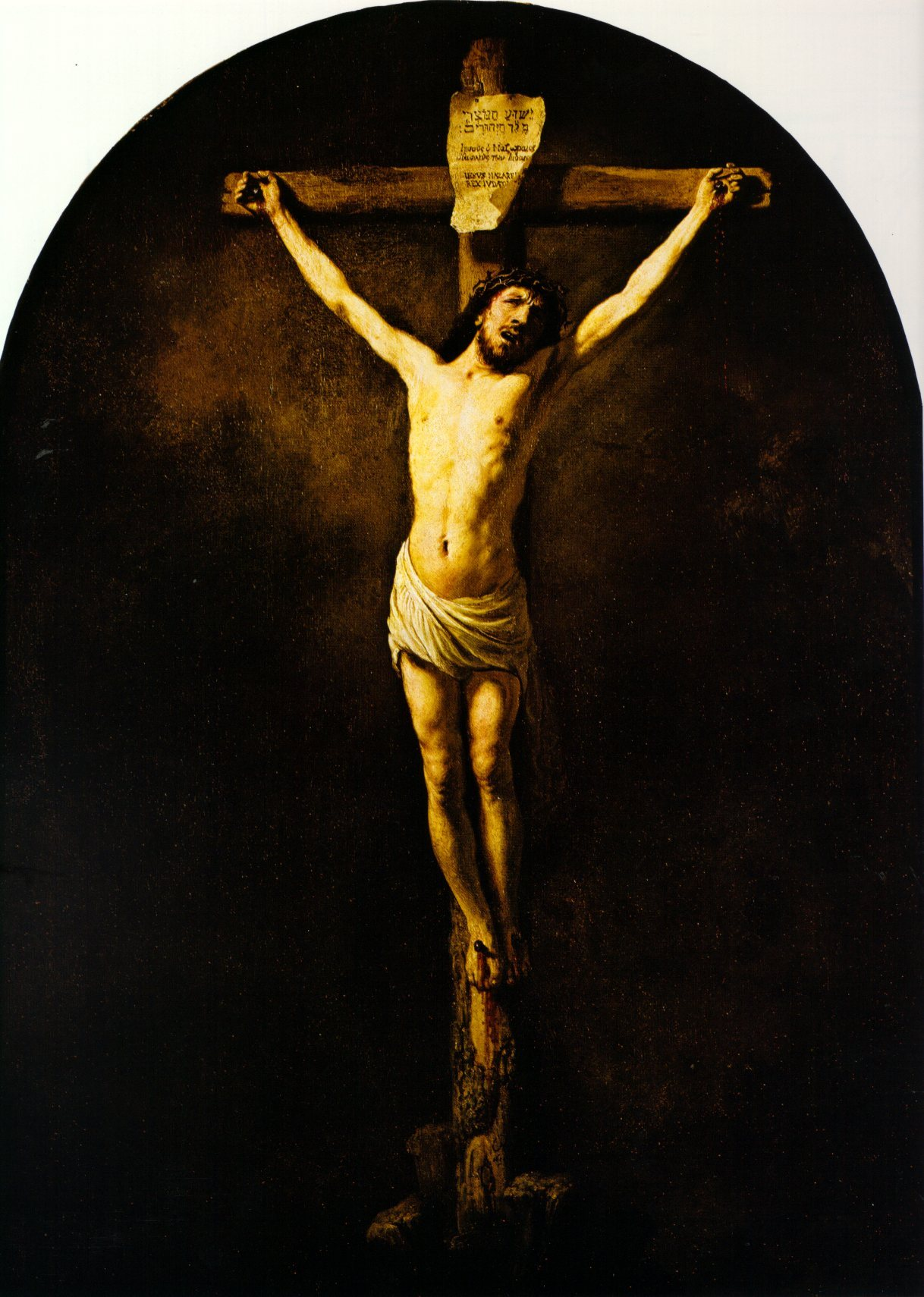

Christ on the Cross is a 1631 oil-on-canvas painting by Rembrandt, now in the Église Saint-Vincent in the French town of Le Mas-d'Agenais, Lot-et-Garonne.

The inventory of Catharina Elisabeth Bode was made in Delft on 27 October 1703—she was the widow of Valerius Röver. It mentions "a piece of painterly invention [titled] Christ on the Cross by Rembrandt", which may be identifiable with the work now in Le Mas-d'Agenais. On 9 May 1781 it was sold off in the auction of the collection of Marie-Alexandrine de Fraula bij veilinghuis J. Garemyn in Bruges as "Jesus nailed to the Cross ... painted in the year 1631, by Rembrandt". In 1804 it was bought by Xavier Duffour of Le Mas-d'Agenais. According to the art historian Kurt Bauch he bought it during the sale of the belongings of a family in Dunkirk. In 1805 Duffour donated the painting to its present home.

== See also ==
- List of paintings by Rembrandt

== Bibliography ==
- (in French) Le siècle de Rembrandt, tableaux hollandais des collections publiques françaises, Musée du Petit Palais, Parijs, 17 november 1970-15 februari 1971, cat.nr. 170.
- (in French) Rembrandt & Lievens in Leiden. 'een jong en edel schildersduo', Stedelijk Museum De Lakenhal, Leiden, 4 december 1991-1 maart 1992, ISBN 9066303212, pp. 115–116.
- (in French) Rembrandt et la figure du Christ, Musée du Louvre, Parijs, 21 april-18 juli 2011, ISBN 978-88-89854-71-6, cat.nr. 10.
