= Bust of a Man Wearing a Gorget and Plumed Beret =

1626–1627 painting by Rembrandt van Rijn

Man in a gorget and a plumed cap
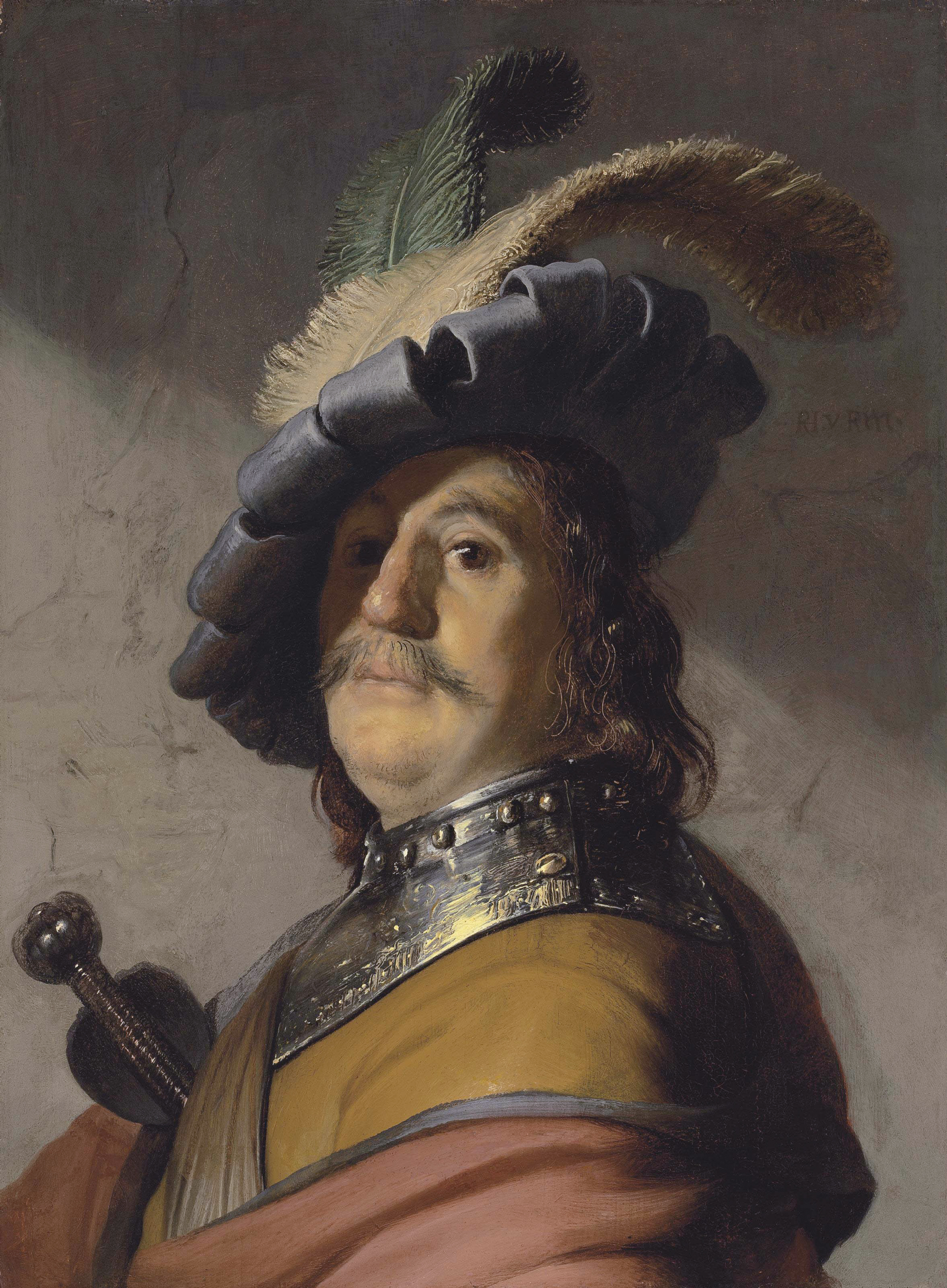
- Artist: Rembrandt
- Year: 1626
- Medium: oil paint, oak panel
- Dimensions: 40 cm (16 in) × 29.4 cm (11.6 in)

Bust of a Man Wearing a Gorget and Plumed Beret is an oil-on-panel painting by the Dutch artist Rembrandt, dating to c. 1626–1627. It measures 39.8 by 29.4 centimetres (15.7 in × 11.6 in) and is held in a private collection. It is believed to be the earliest extant single-figure painting by Rembrandt.

The work was painted when Rembrandt was in his early twenties working in Leiden. X-ray analysis shows that it was painted over an earlier work depicting the head of an old man.

The identity of the subject is not known, but it is believed to be a character study or "tronie" of a historical character, wearing costume – gorget and cap with feather plume – fashionable in the 15th century, possibly inspired by a woodcut print of a lansquenet.

The subject is depicted in a pose typical of Rembrandt's work, with the subject looking over the left shoulder. It uses an exaggerated fall of light, creating bright highlights and deep shadows, perhaps inspired by Caravaggio.

The early history of the painting is not known with much certainty. It may have been held by Leo Nardus. It was acquired by Heinrich Baron Thyssen-Bornemisza around 1929, and displayed at Schloss Rohoncz at Rechnitz and later at Villa Favorita in Lugano. It was sold by his daughter Margit von Batthyány before 1954, and then auctioned at Christie's in London in 1974 and acquired by Herman Shickman and Lila Shickman. It was acquired by Pieter Dreesmann (son of Anton Dreesmann of the Dutch department store chain V&D) and Olga Dreesmann in 2002, and sold from their collection at Christie's in London in 2012, for £8,441,250. A copy of the painting was sold at Christie's in 1952.

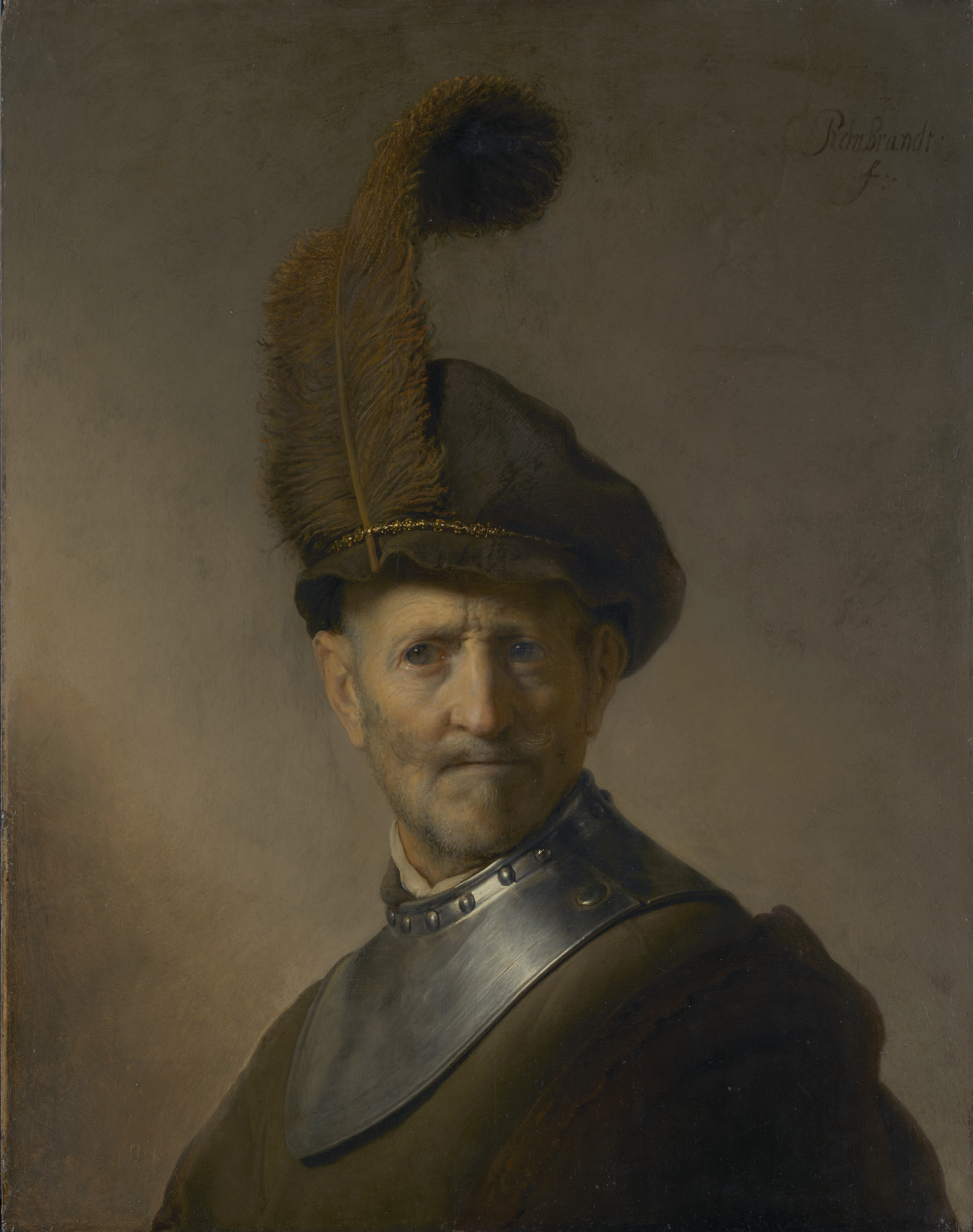
1630

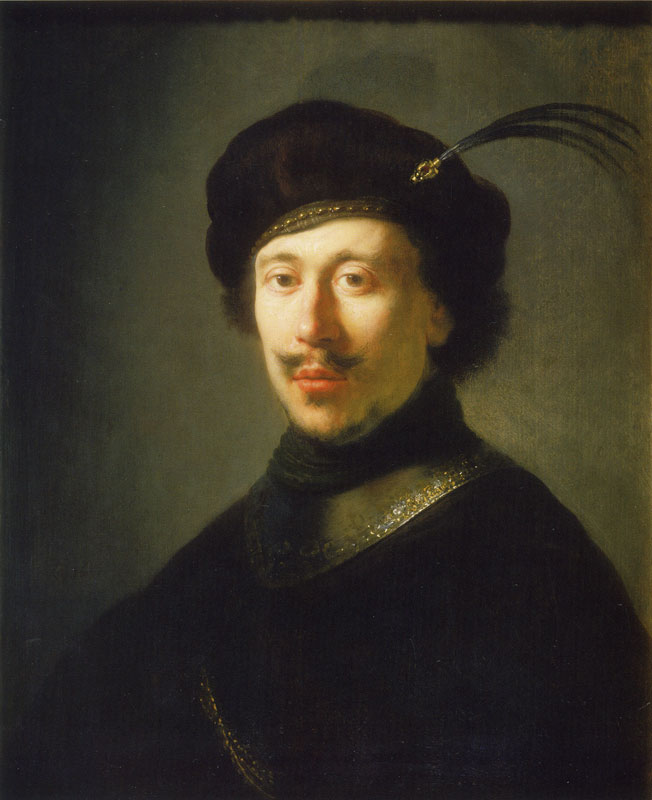
1631

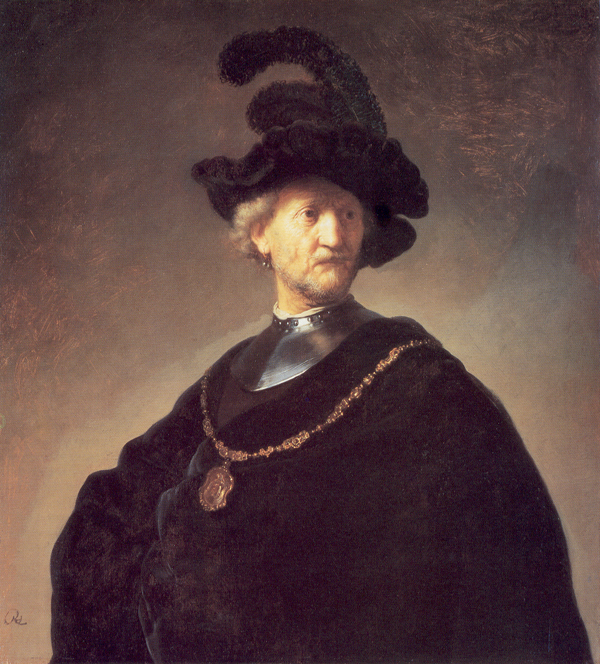
1631

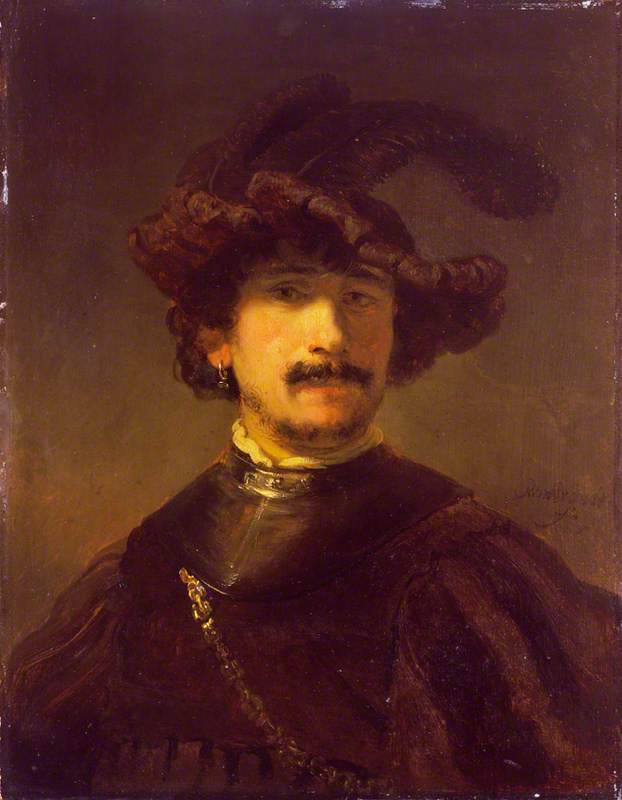
1634

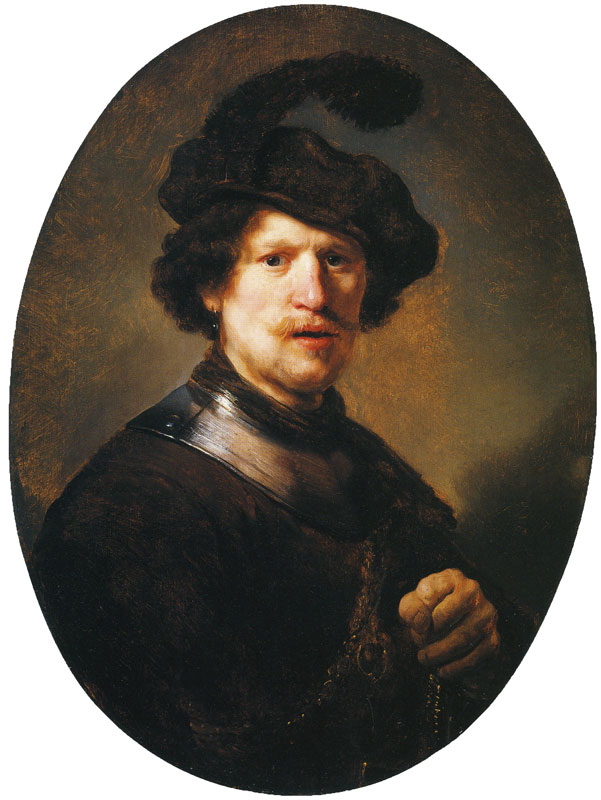
1635

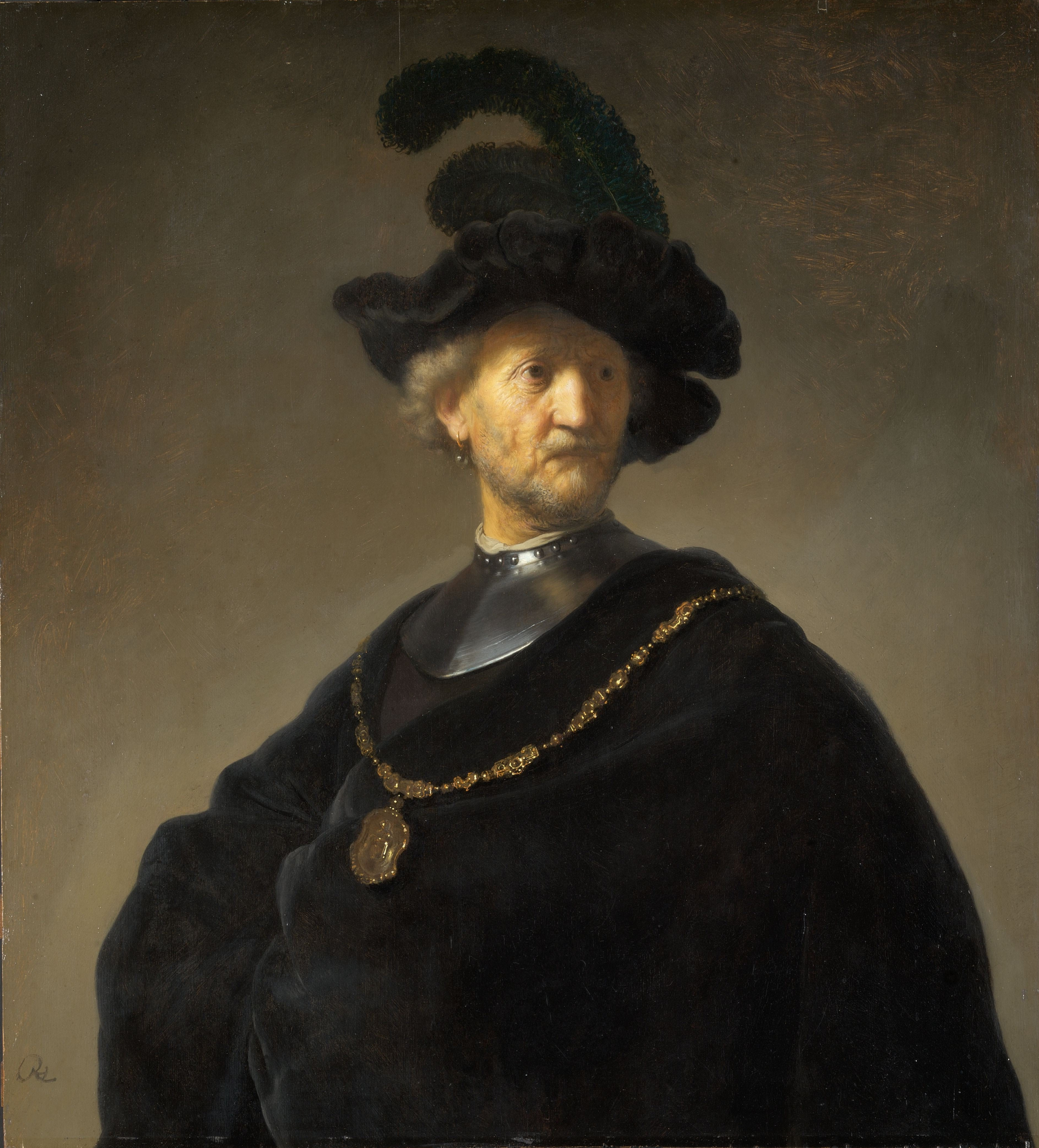
Old Man with a Gold Chain, 1631

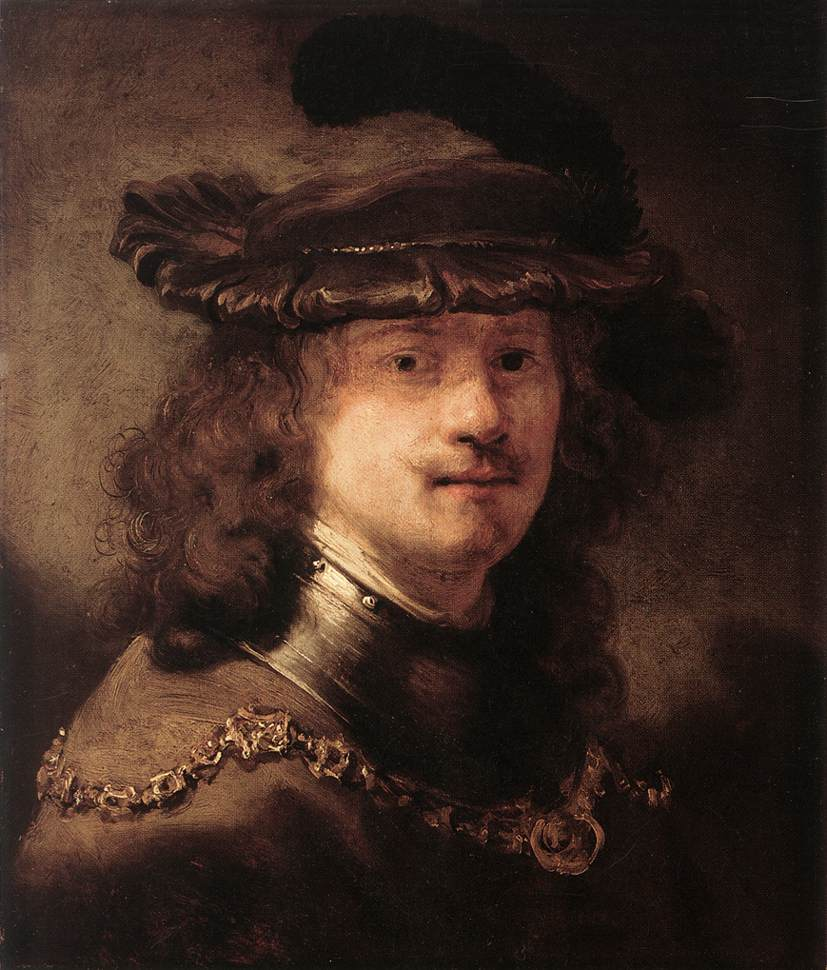
1633–34

== See also ==
- List of paintings by Rembrandt
