= A Woman Weeping =

1644 painting

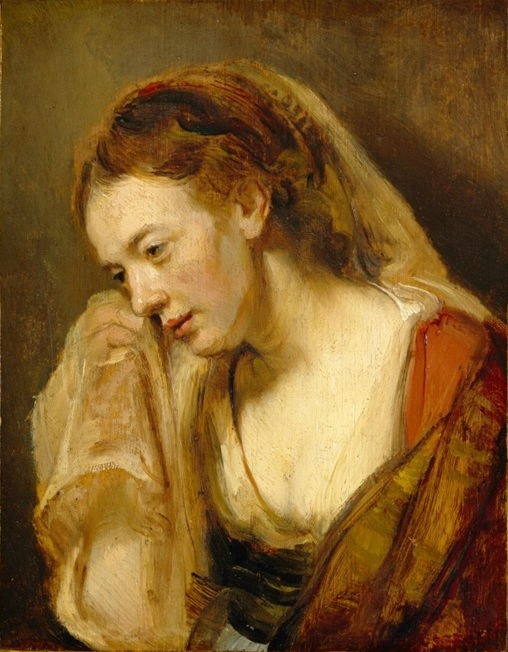

A Woman Weeping, also known as A Weeping Woman or Study of a Weeping Woman, is a 1644 oil on oak panel painting, now in the Detroit Institute of Arts. It almost exactly corresponds to the kneeling woman in Rembrandt's The Woman Taken in Adultery (National Gallery, London) and is thought to be by one of his students after an autograph original study – Kurt Bauch argued this student was Carel Fabritius, whilst Werner Sumowski felt the strongest candidates were Samuel van Hoogstraten and Nicolaes Maes.

== Ownership ==
First recorded in the Holland collection in London, it was auctioned at Christie's in London in 1914 to a Mr Smith and later that year was recorded as belonging to the London-based collector F. W. Lippmann. In 1916, it was in Oscar Huldschinsky's collection in Berlin. It was sold by the Berlin art dealers Cassirer und Helbing for 68,000 Marks on 10 November 1928 and was recorded in a Berlin private collection in 1937. In 1938, it was owned by the F. Drey Gallery in London and in 1947 by Mrs Hanni Seligman in New York. In 1956, it was sold to its present owner via the art dealer Rosenberg and Stiebel.

== Sources ==
- "A Woman Weeping, mid- to late 1640s". Detroit Institute of Arts.
