= Christ and St Mary Magdalen at the Tomb =

1638 painting by Rembrandt Van Rijn

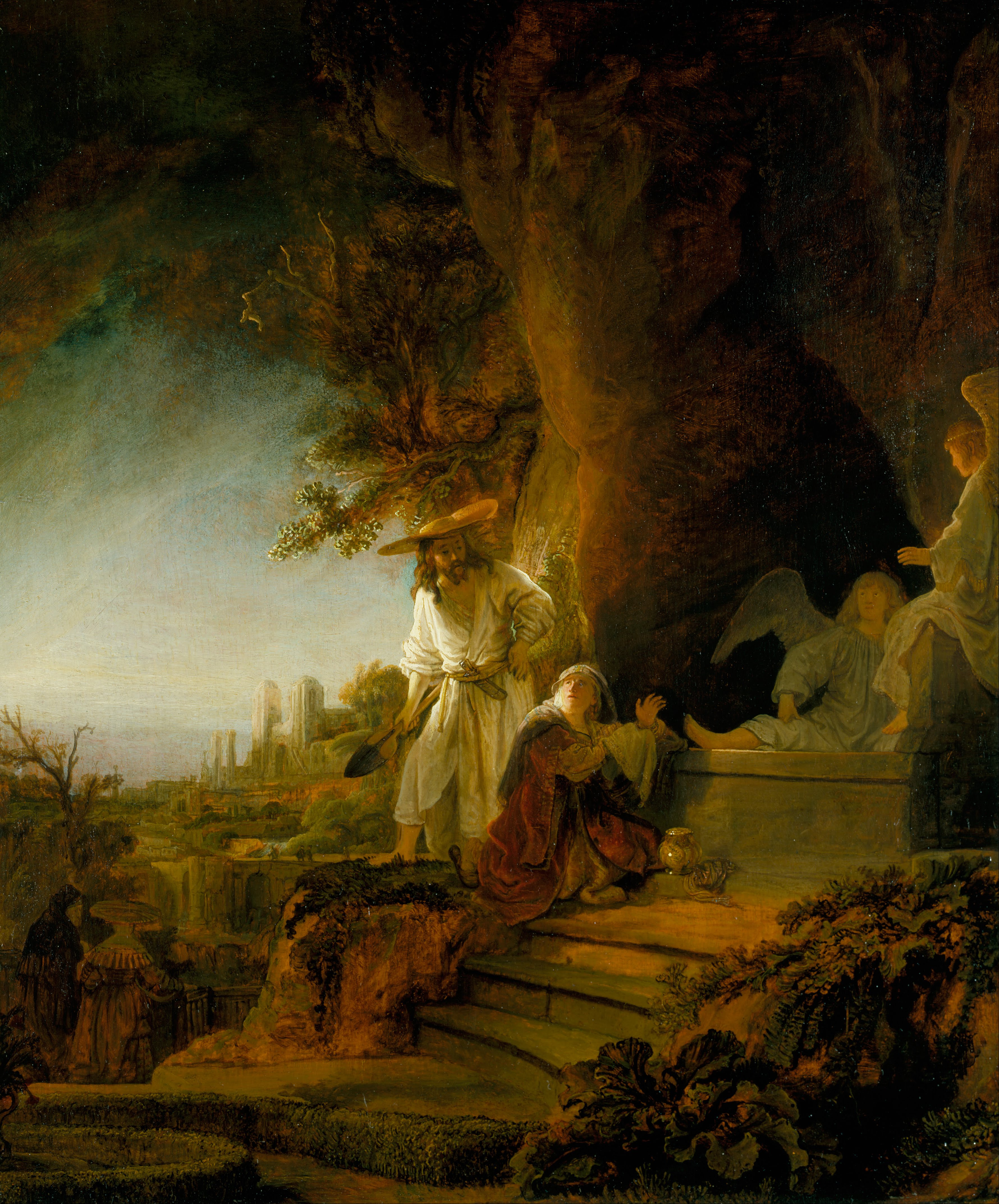
- Artist: Rembrandt
- Year: 1638
- Medium: oil on panel
- Dimensions: 61 cm × 50 cm (24 in × 20 in)
- Location: Royal Collection

Christ and St Mary Magdalen at the Tomb is an oil on panel painting by the Dutch golden age artist Rembrandt Van Rijn. The painting depicts a scene from the Gospel of St John (20:11-18) in which Mary Magdalene arrives at the tomb of Christ the day after the tomb was sealed.

== History ==
The painting was created in 1638; it is one of two paintings by Rembrandt showing Mary Magdalene and Christ, and dates from a period when the artist painted multiple biblical scenes, in the 1630s and the 1640s. It was bought in 1819 by the British Prince Regent, the future George IV, for an unspecified amount of money, and since then it has been a part of the Royal Collection.

The angel in Rembrandt's painting may be the source for the "Paul Before Felix" works (1751) by William Hogarth.

== See also ==
- List of paintings by Rembrandt
