= Self-Portrait in a Gorget =

Painting by Rembrandt, c. 1629

Self-portrait with breastplate
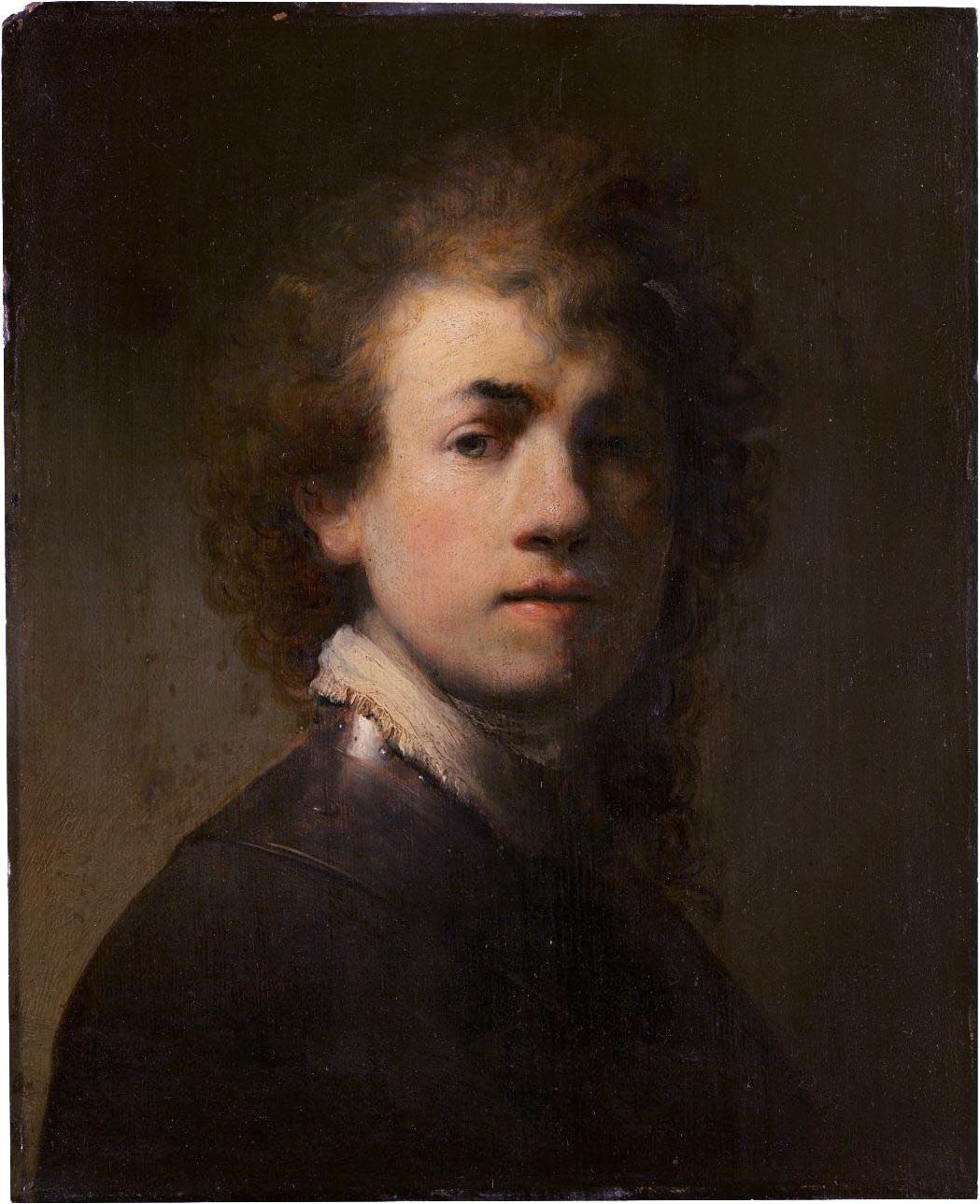
- Artist: Rembrandt
- Year: c. 1629
- Medium: oil paint, oak panel
- Dimensions: 38.2 cm (15.0 in) × 31 cm (12 in)
- Identifiers: RKDimages ID: 32002; Bildindex der Kunst und Architektur ID: 00021964

Self-Portrait in a Gorget is an oil on panel self-portrait by Dutch painter Rembrandt, created c. 1629. It is held in the Germanisches Nationalmuseum, in Nuremberg.

== See also ==
- Self-portraiture
- Self-portraits by Rembrandt
- List of paintings by Rembrandt

== Sources ==
- http://objektkatalog.gnm.de/objekt/Gm391
