= Titus at a Lectern =

1655 painting by Rembrandt

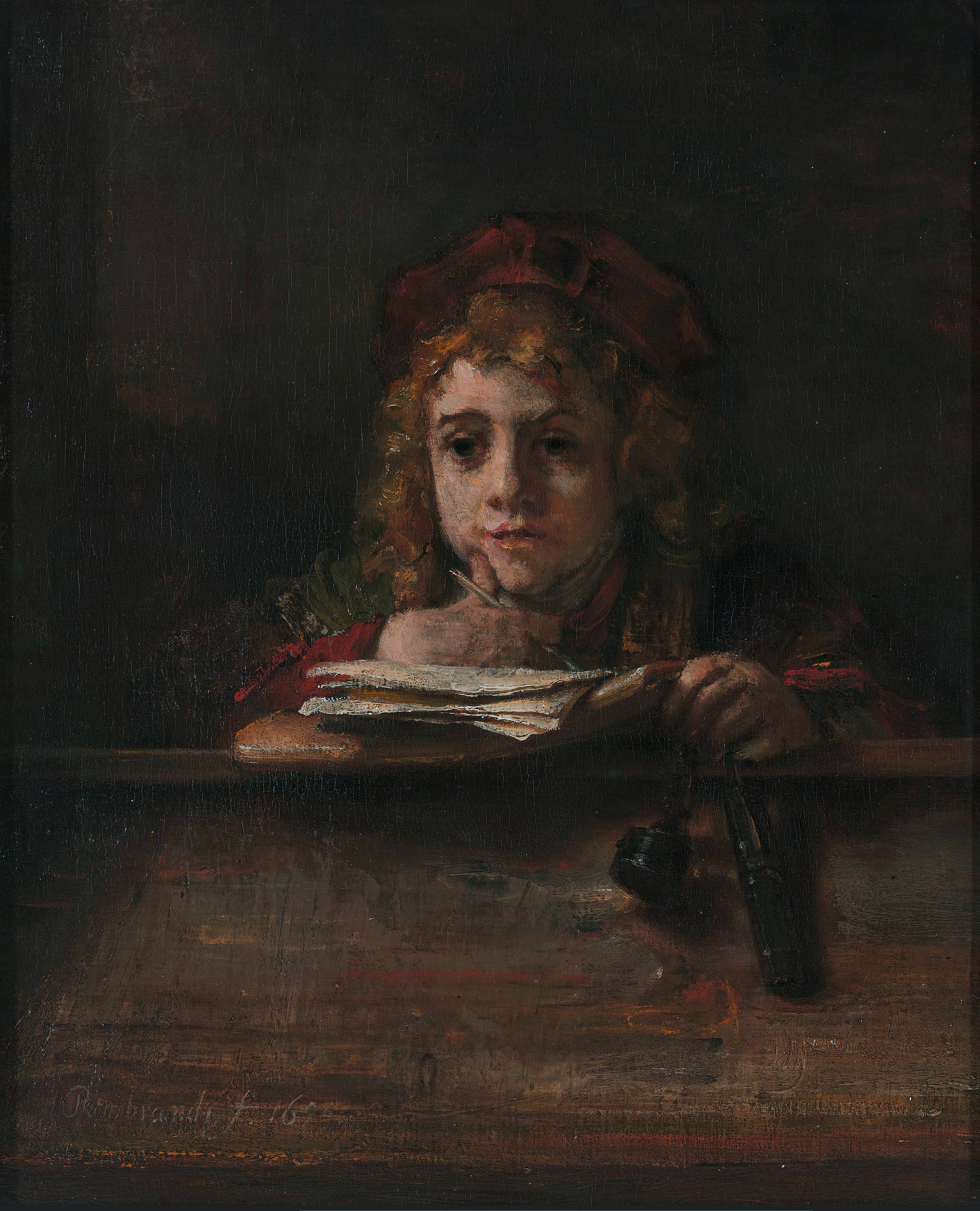
Titus at a Lectern at the Museum Boijmans Van Beuningen

Titus at a Lectern or Titus at his Desk is a 1655 portrait by Rembrandt of his son Titus van Rijn, which has been in the Museum Boijmans Van Beuningen since 1939.

== Sources ==
- collectie.boijmans.nl
