= The Workers in the Vineyard (Rembrandt) =

Painting by Rembrandt

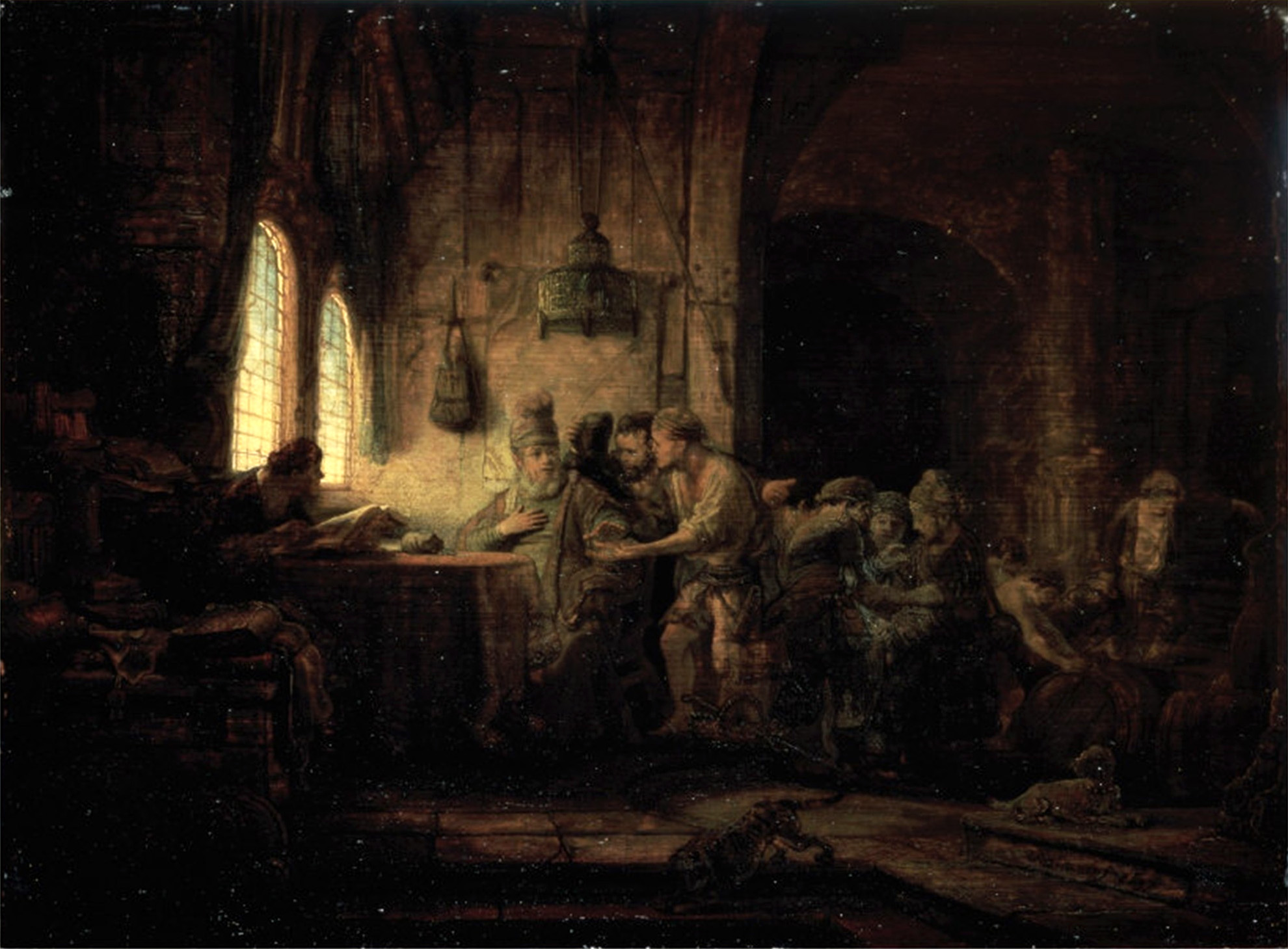

The Workers in the Vineyard or The Parable of the Labourers in the Vineyard is an uncompleted 1637 oil on oak panel painting by Rembrandt, now in the Hermitage Museum. It depicts the Parable of the Workers in the Vineyard
