= Simeon in the Temple =

Painting by Rembrandt

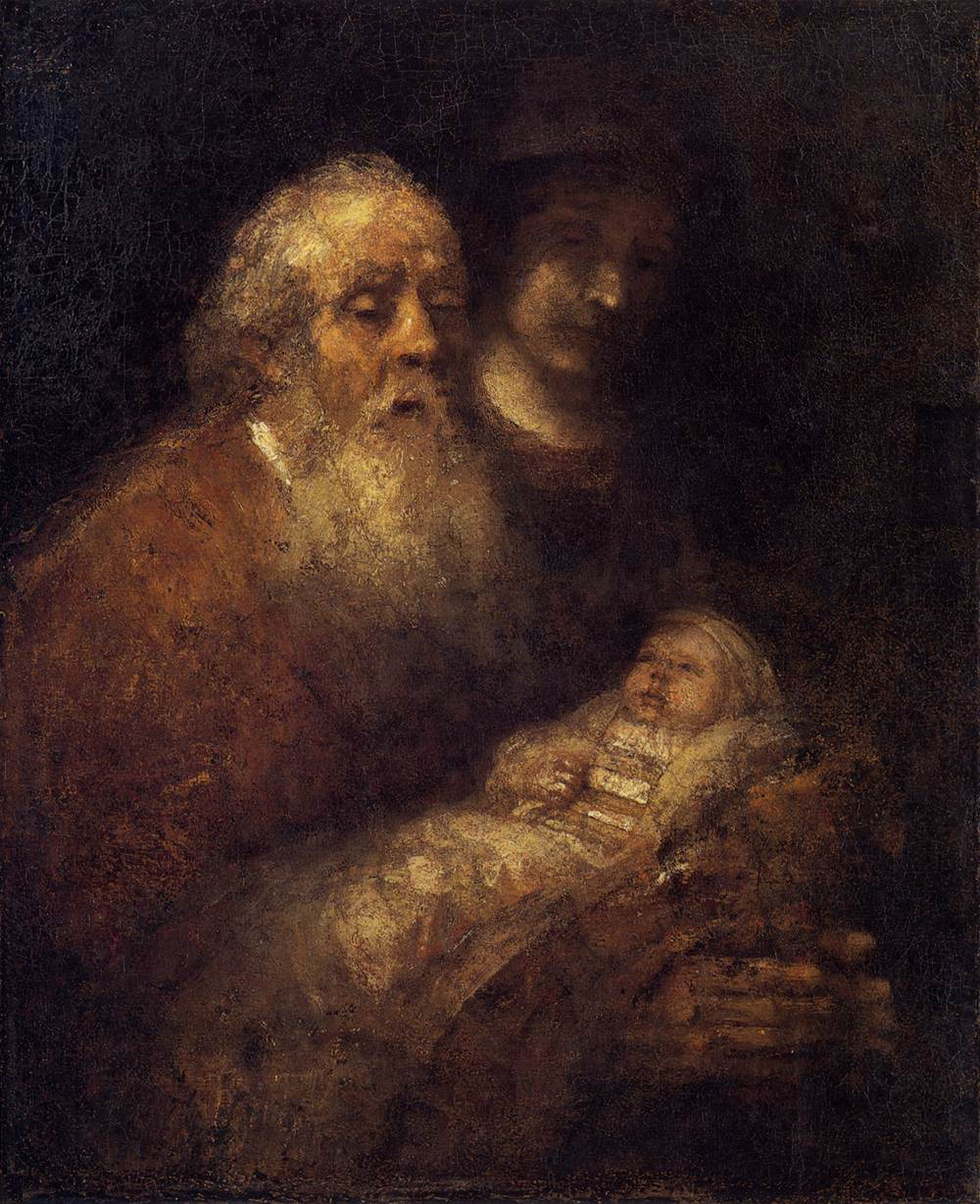
- Artist: Rembrandt
- Year: c. 1669
- Medium: Oil on canvas
- Dimensions: 98,5 cm × 79,5 cm (388 in × 313 in)
- Location: Nationalmuseum, Stockholm

Simeon in the Temple or Simeons song of praise is an oil on canvas painting by the Dutch artist Rembrandt from c. 1669. It has been in the collections of Nationalmuseum in Stockholm since 1949.

According to the Gospel of Luke (2: 25–35), the pious Simeon had been promised by God not to die until he saw the Messiah. When the Christ Child was presented in the temple in Jerusalem, he understood that the Savior had come and praised God ("Nunc dimittis").

The painting was Rembrandt's last and remained unfinished at his death. The woman in the background, who either represents Mary or Anna the Prophetess, was probably added after artist's death by an unknown painter working in Rembrandt's workshop.

Rembrandt had painted the same motif at least twice before: in Simeon and Anna in the Temple, and in Simeon's Song of Praise.

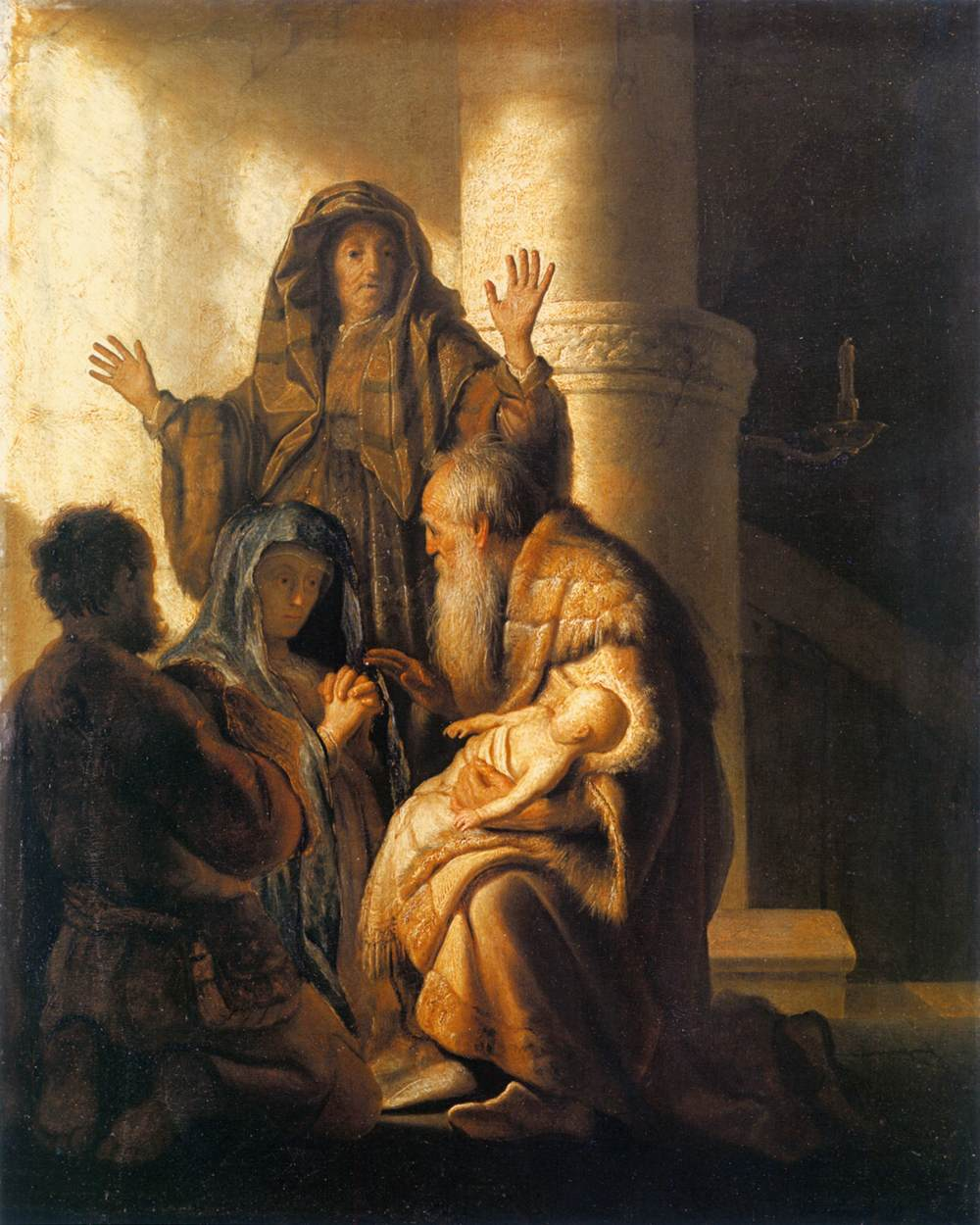
Rembrandts Simeon and Anna in the Temple (1627–1628), since 1912 in Hamburger Kunsthalle. Oil on Oak Panel (55.4 x 43.7 cm).

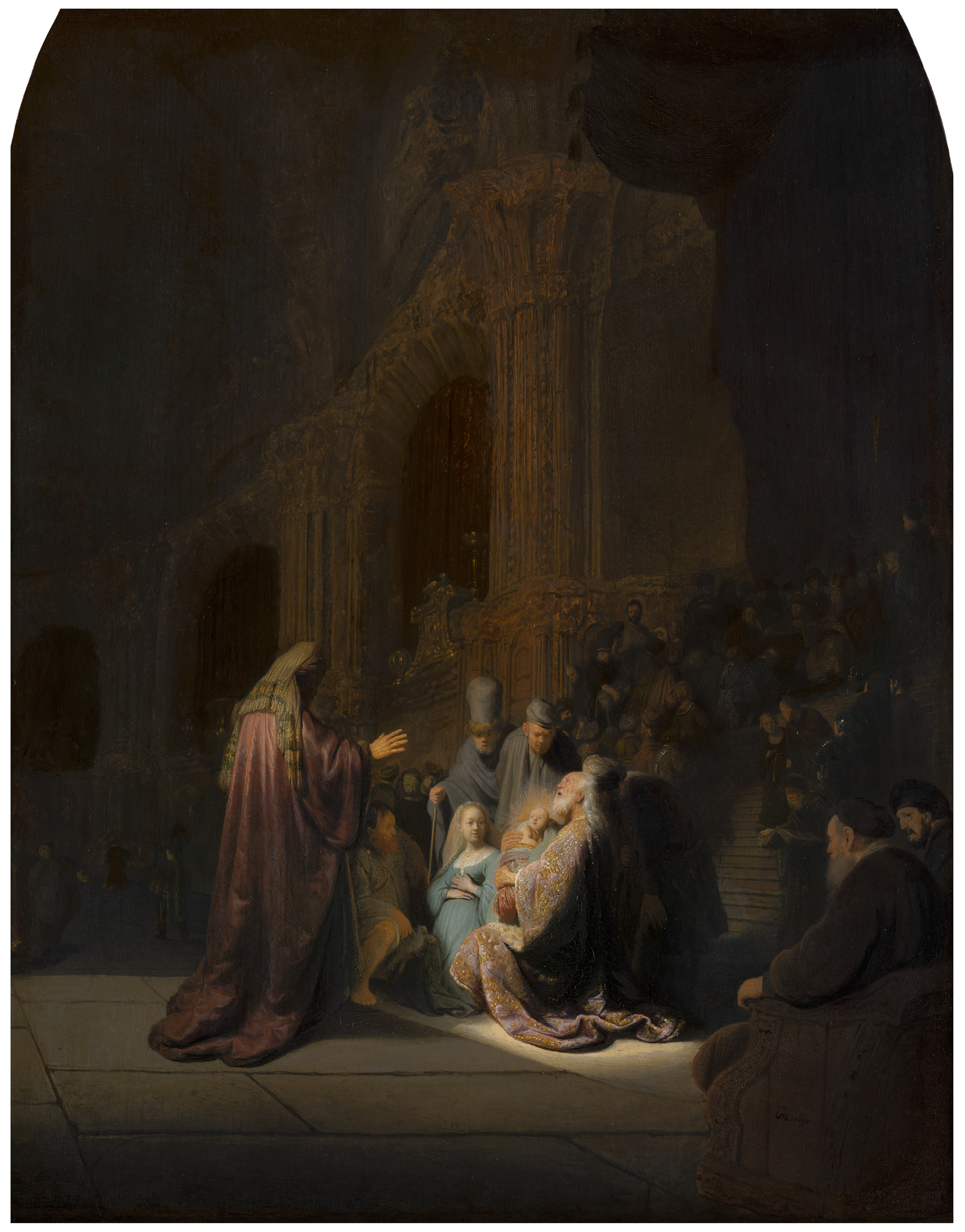
Rembrandts Simeons song of praise (1631), since 1816 in the Mauritshuis in The Hague. Oil on Oak Panel (60.9 x 47.9 cm).
