= The Woman Taken in Adultery (Rembrandt) =

Painting by Rembrandt

The Woman taken in Adultery
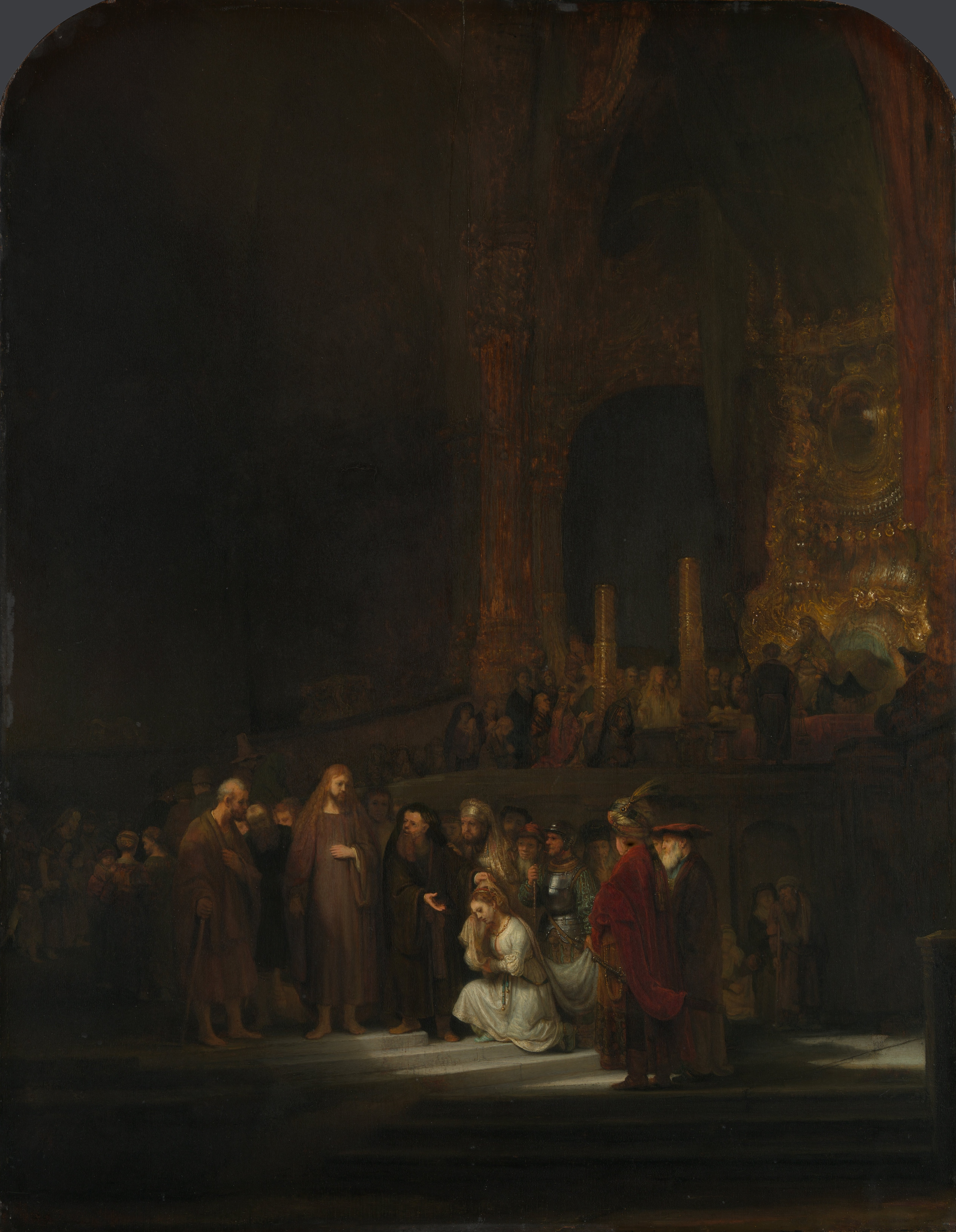
- Artist: Rembrandt
- Year: 1644
- Medium: Oil on oak panel
- Dimensions: 83.8 cm × 65.4 cm (33.0 in × 25.7 in)
- Location: National Gallery; London

The Woman Taken in Adultery is a painting of 1644 by Rembrandt, bought by the National Gallery in London in 1824, as one of their foundation batch of paintings. It is in oil on oak, and 83.8 x 65.4 cm.

Rembrandt shows the episode of Jesus and the woman taken in adultery from the Gospel of Saint John. In this scene, a few Jews, mainly Scribes and Pharisees, tried to catch Jesus condoning disobedience to the Jewish Law, knowing that Jesus pitied wrong-doers. To do this, they produced a woman who had been caught taking part in adultery. Then, they said "Teacher, this woman has been caught in the act of adultery. Now in the law Moses commanded us to stone such. What do you say about her?" Jesus replied, "He that is without sin among you, let him first cast a stone at her" (John 8:3–7).

Rembrandt made Jesus appear taller than the other figures and more brightly lit. In contrast, the Jews are "in the dark" and appear lower. Symbolically, Jesus's height represents his moral superiority over those who attempted to trick him.

== Painting materials ==
The painting was investigated by the scientists of the National Gallery London. Rembrandt employed his usual limited number of pigments, such as ochres, vermilion, red lakes, lead white, lead-tin-yellow and bone black.

== See also ==
- List of paintings by Rembrandt
