= Adolf Rosenberg =

German art historian (1850–1906)

- Born: 30 January 1850; Bydgoszcz, Poland
- Died: 26 February 1906 (aged 56); Berlin, Germany

Carl Adolf Rosenberg (1850 – 1906) was a German theater critic and art historian.

Rosenberg was born as the son of a Prussian merchant in Bydgoszcz and attended secondary school in Berlin and Cologne. He studied classics and archeology at the University of Berlin. After completing his doctorate on the Furies, he undertook study trips to places in Germany, Austria, Italy, France, Belgium and the Netherlands. He became a prolific writer on the arts and is known best for his illustrated biographies and catalogs on Rubens, Rembrandt and other artists.

Rosenberg died in Berlin, Germany.

== Works ==
- Adolf Rosenberg: Herr Professor Boetticher als Archaeologe: Ein Beitrag zur Geschichte der Berliner Archäologie. Berlin 1873
- Adolf Rosenberg: Die Erinyen. Ein Beitrag zur Religion und Kunst der Griechen. Borntraeger Eggers, Berlin 1874
- Adolf Rosenberg: Sebald und Barthel Beham, zwei Maler der deutschen Renaissance. Seemann, Leipzig 1875
- Hugo Licht (Hrsg.): Adolf Rosenberg: Die Architektur Berlins: Sammlung hervorragender Bauausführungen der letzten Jahre. Wasmuth, Berlin 1877
- Adolf Rosenberg: Die Berliner Malerschule 1819-1879: Studien und Kritiken. Wasmuth, Berlin 1879
- Adolf Rosenberg: Rubensbriefe. Gesammelt und erläutert von Adolf Rosenberg. Leipzig, 1881 version in the university of Heidelberg library
- Adolf Rosenberg: Geschichte der modernen Kunst. 3 volumes, Grunow, Leipzig 1884−1889
- Adolf Rosenberg and Heinrich Mosler: Klassiker der Baukunst. Lemme, Leipzig 1885
- Adolf Rosenberg: Die Münchener Malerschule in ihrer Entwicklung seit 1871. Seemann, Leipzig 1887
- Adolf Rosenberg: Aus der Düsseldorfer Malerschule : Studien und Skizzen. - Leipzig : Seemann, 1890. version in Düsseldorf library
- Hugo Licht (Hrsg.): Adolf Rosenberg: Architektur der Gegenwart: Übersicht der hervorragendsten Bauausführungen der Neuzeit. 5 volumes, Wasmuth, Berlin 1892–1898
- Adolf Rosenberg: A. von Werner Velhagen & Klasing, Bielefeld-Leipzig 1895
- Adolf Rosenberg and Hermann Knackfuss: Teniers der Jüngere; mit 63 Abbildungen von Gemälden und Zeichnungen. Künstler-Monographien 8, Velhagen & Klasing, Bielefel-Leipzig 1895
- Adolf Rosenberg: Antoine Watteau Velhagen & Klasing, Bielefeld-Leipzig 1896
- Adolf Rosenberg: Thorwaldsen. Künstler-Monographien 16, Velhagen & Klasing, Bielefeld-Leipzig 1896
- Adolf Rosenberg: Defregger: mit 96 Abbildungen nach Gemälden und Zeichnungen. Künstler-Monographien 18, Velhagen & Klasing, Bielefeld-Leipzig 1897
- Adolf Rosenberg: Terborch und Jan Steen (with 95 illustrations). Künstler-Monographien 19, Velhagen & Klasing, Bielefeld-Leipzig 1897
- Adolf Rosenberg: Vautier: mit 111 Abbildungen nach Gemälden und Zeichnungen. Künstler-Monographien 23, Velhagen & Klasing, Bielefeld-Leipzig 1897
- Adolf Rosenberg: Lenbach: mit 101 Abbildungen nach Gemälden und Zeichnungen. Künstler-Monographien 34, Velhagen & Klasing, Bielefeld-Leipzig 1898
- Adolf Rosenberg: Leonardo da Vinci: mit 128 Abb. nach Gemälden u. Zeichn. Künstler-Monographien 33, Velhagen & Klasing, Bielefeld-Leipzig 1898
- Adolf Rosenberg: E. von Gebhardt Künstler-Monographien 38, Velhagen & Klasing, Bielefeld-Leipzig 1899
- Adolf Rosenberg: Eberlein. Künstler-Monographien 66, Velhagen & Klasing, Bielefeld-Leipzig 1899
- Adolf Rosenberg: Adriaen und Isack van Ostade Velhagen & Klasing, Bielefeld-Leipzig 1900
- Adolf Rosenberg: Friedrich August von Kaulbach: mit 107 Abbildungen nach Gemälden und Zeichnungen. Künstler-Monographien 48, Velhagen & Klasing, Bielefeld-Leipzig 1900
- Adolf Rosenberg: Prell: mit 115 Abbildungen nach Gemälden, Zeichnungen und Skulpturen. Künstler-Monographien 53, Velhagen & Klasing, Bielefeld-Leipzig 1901
- Adolf Rosenberg: Handbuch der Kunstgeschichte.Velhagen & Klasing, Bielefeld-Leipzig 1902
- Adolf Rosenberg: Raffael: des Meisters Gemälde in 202 Abbildungen. Klassiker der Kunst in Gesamtausgaben 1, Deutsche Verlags-Anstalt, Stuttgart-Leipzig 1904
- Adolf Rosenberg: P. P. Rubens: des Meisters Gemälde in 551 Abbildungen. Klassiker der Kunst in Gesamtausgaben 5, Deutsche Verlags-Anstalt, Stuttgart-Leipzig 1905
- Adolf Rosenberg and Eduard Heyck: Geschichte des Kostüms. 5 volumes, Wasmuth, Berlin 1905−1925
- Adolf Rosenberg and Wilhelm Valentiner: Rembrandt: des Meisters Gemälde in 643 Abbildungen Klassiker der Kunst in Gesamtausgaben 2, Deutsche Verlags-Anstalt, Stuttgart-Leipzig 1906
