= Portrait of a Girl (after Rembrandt) =

1632 painting after Rembrandt

- Portrait of a girl in a millstone collar
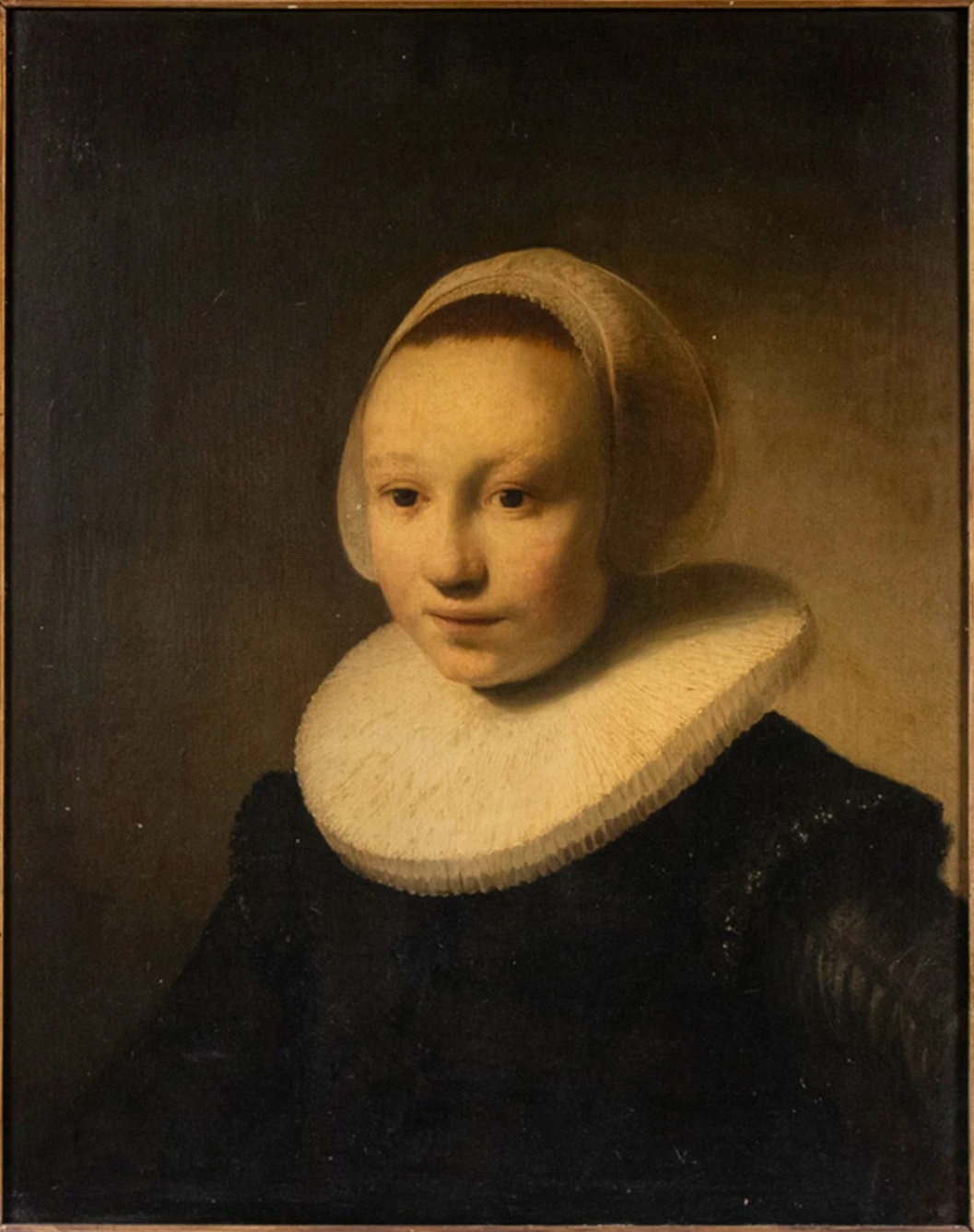
- Artist: Unknown
- Year: c. 1632
- Dimensions: 56.4 cm (22.2 in) × 41.5 cm (16.3 in)
- Location: P. & D. Colnaghi & Co., Mauritshuis
- Owner: Abraham Bredius, Mary Louise Curtis
- Collection: Mauritshuis

Portrait of a Girl is a circa 1632 portrait painting formerly attributed to Rembrandt. It shows a woman with a millstone collar and diadem cap. It was sold on 24 August 2024 for US$1,468,750 in Thomaston, Maine, near where it had been stored since 1970 in the collection of Cary W. Bok. It had been in the collection of Abraham Bredius who lent it for several years to the Mauritshuis, but it landed up in the Philadelphia collection of Mrs. Zimbalist, who in turn left it to her son Cary W. Bok, who outlived his mother by less than a year.

== Description ==
Several portraits of women of 17th-century Amsterdam have survived. Some are pendants and others are individual portraits. This painting has been attributed to Rembrandt since the 19th-century, but the name of the sitter is unknown. This painting came into the American collection possibly through Mrs. Zimbalist's first husband Edward Bok, who was Dutch and also owned a portrait by Frans Hals. The back of the painting has a Philadelphia Museum of Art label with typed text indicating it was considered a Rembrandt by the lender "Cary W. Bok of Camden, Maine", and it was lent or intended to be on loan to an exhibition in 1970. Scrawled in faded pen lettering it includes the remark that it had formerly been attributed to Cuyp.

This painting was documented as a Rembrandt in 1914 by Hofstede de Groot, who wrote:

853. A YOUNG GIRL. B.-HdG. 52.- About seventeen. Halflength, without hands; a little under life size. She sits, inclined to the left, with her face to the front. She wears a close-fitting black dress, a narrow white ruff, and a white cap covering her smooth light brown hair. She has brown eyes and a fresh complexion. Light grey background. The light falls full from the left. Painted about 1630-31. The sitter appears to be the same as in 847 (Simon, Berlin).

Signed to the right at top with the monogram, "R" (the lower bar of the L is erased); oak panel, 22 1/2 inches by 17 1/2 inches.

In the possession of M. H. Colnaghi, London, 1893, when it was regarded by dealers as an Aelbert Cuyp.

In the collection of A. Bredius, The Hague; exhibited on loan since 1893 in the Royal Gallery, The Hague, 1914 catalogue, No. 577.

Other Hofstede de Groot attributions to Rembrandt of women wearing diadem caps and millstone collars from the early 1630s:

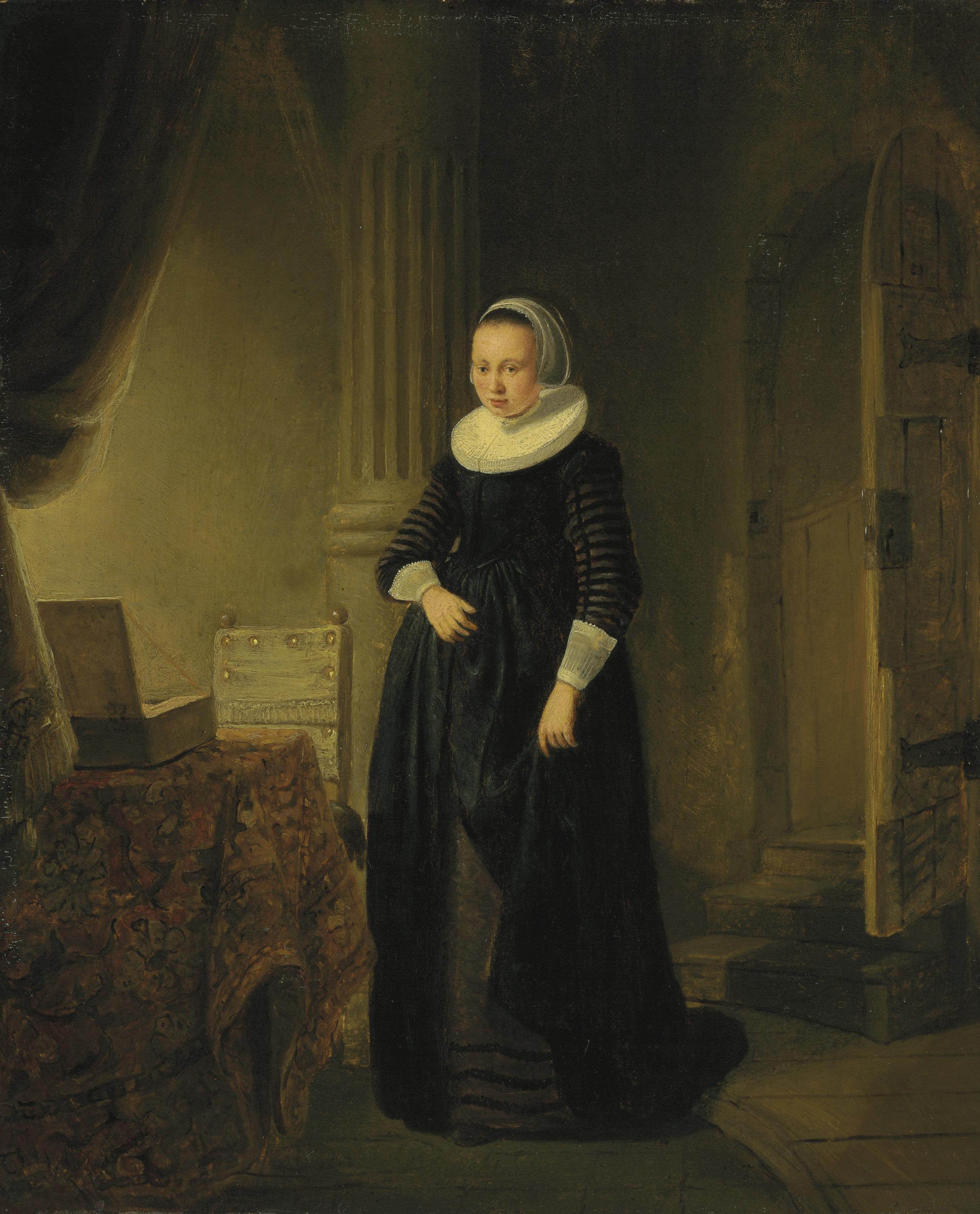
HdG 847, mentioned above as having similar features of the sitter

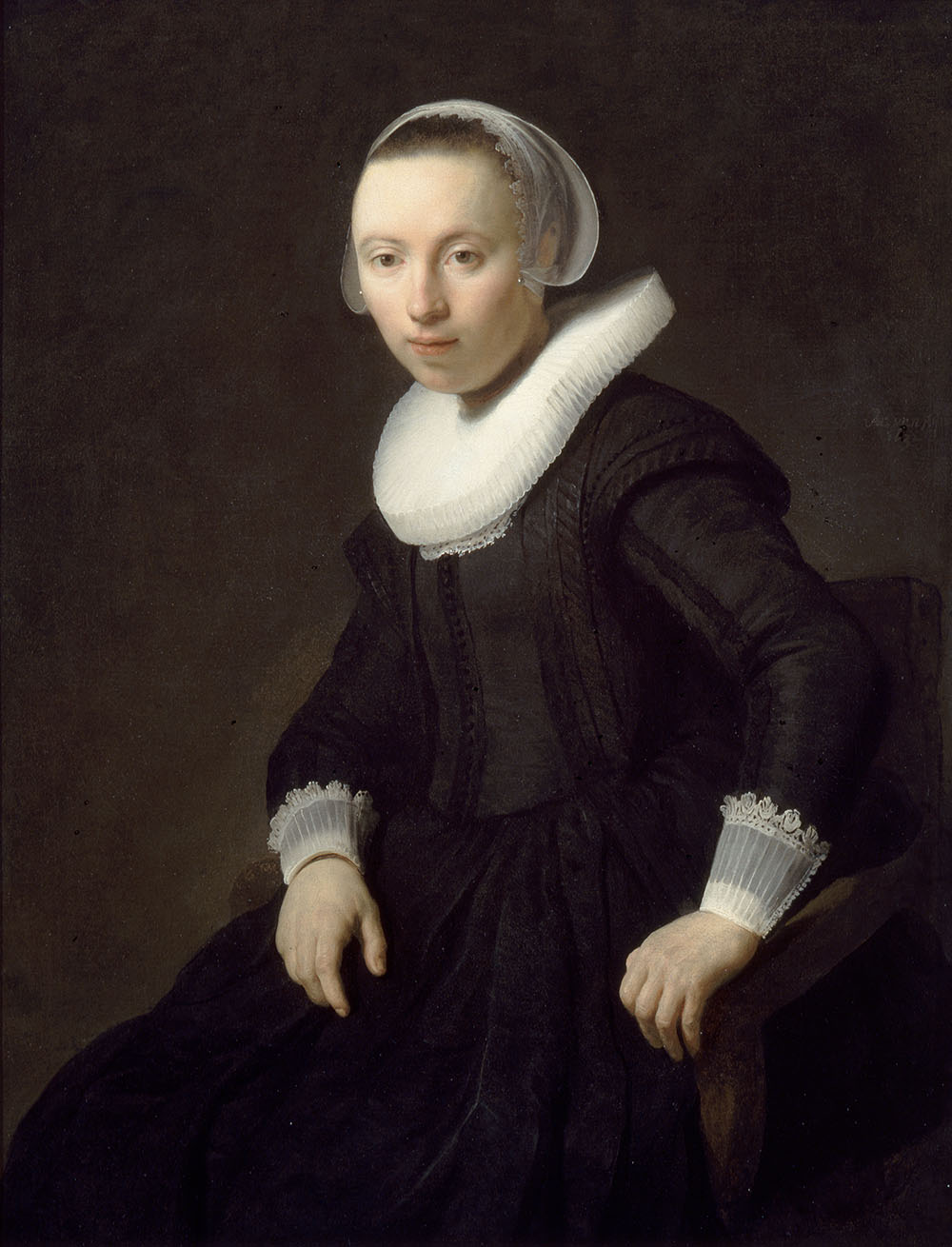
HdG 884, mentioned by Gary Schwartz as having similar features of the sitter

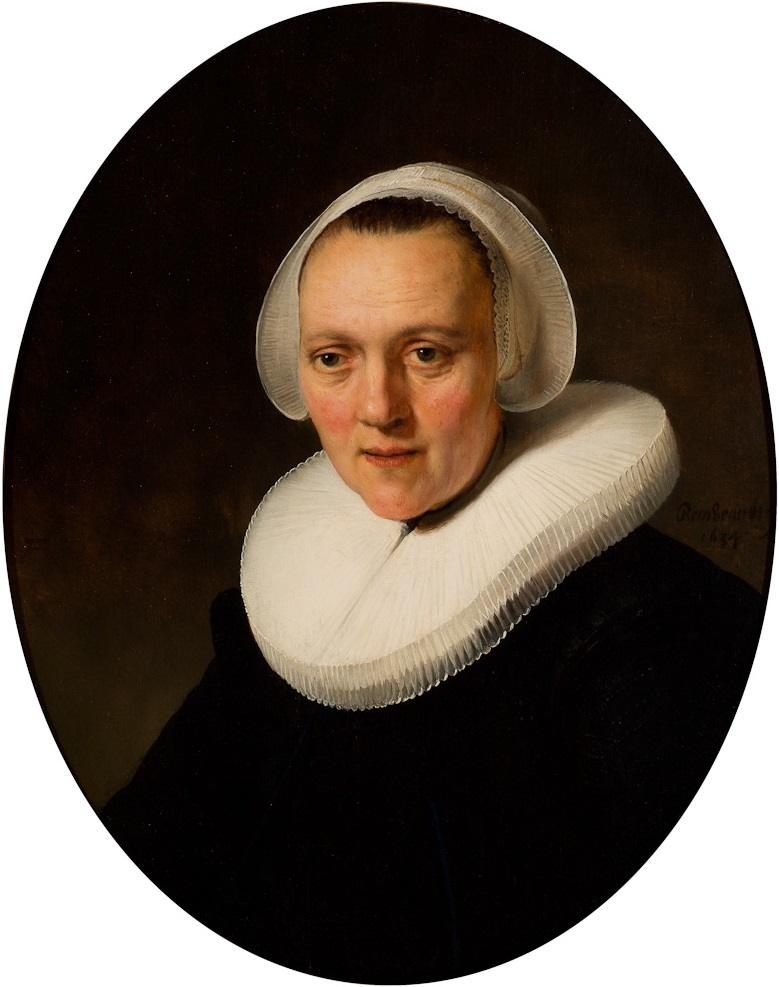
HdG 874, portrait of possibly Marretje Cornelisdr. van Grotewal (Speed Art Museum)

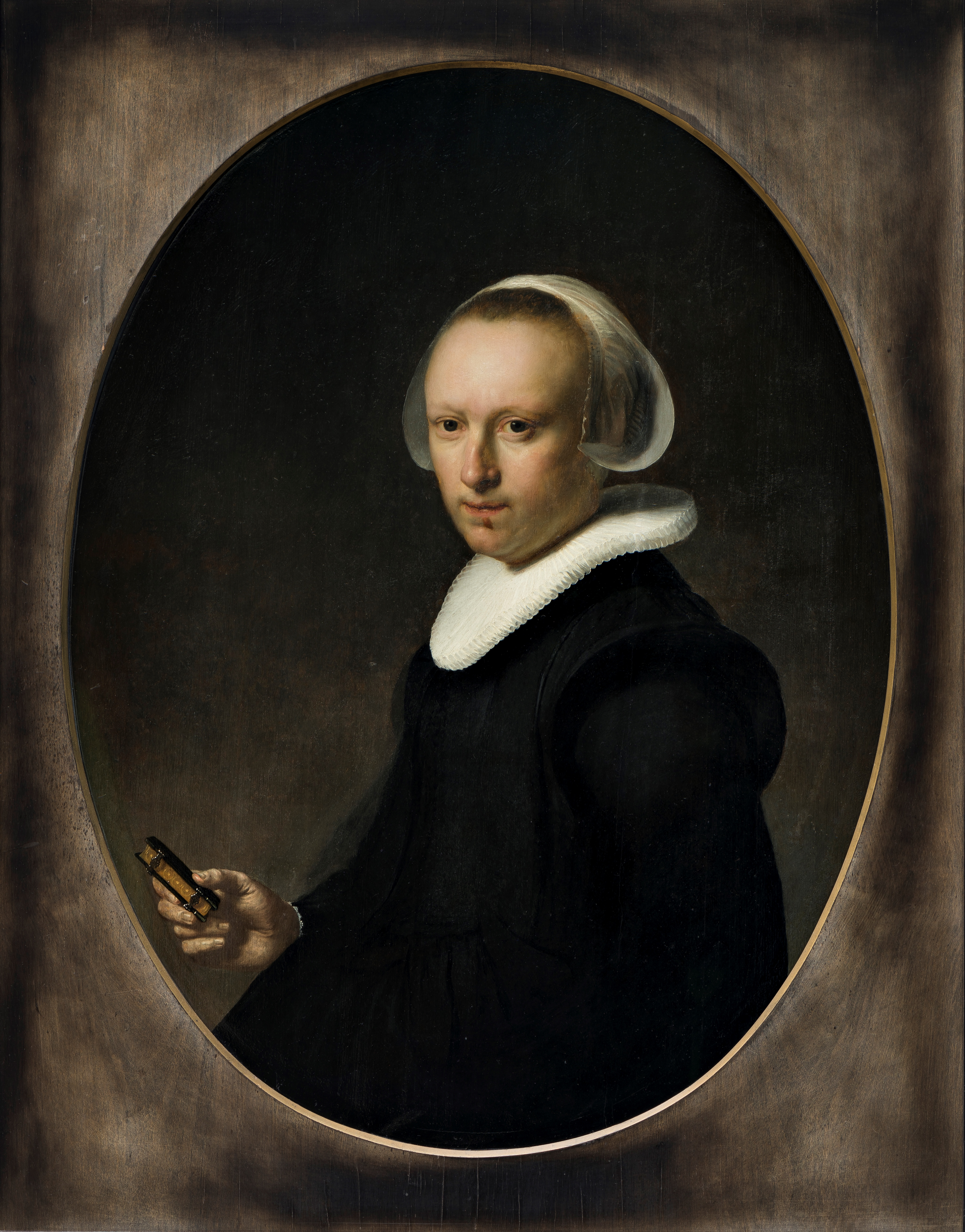
HdG 875, portrait of a 39-year-old woman (Nivaagaard)

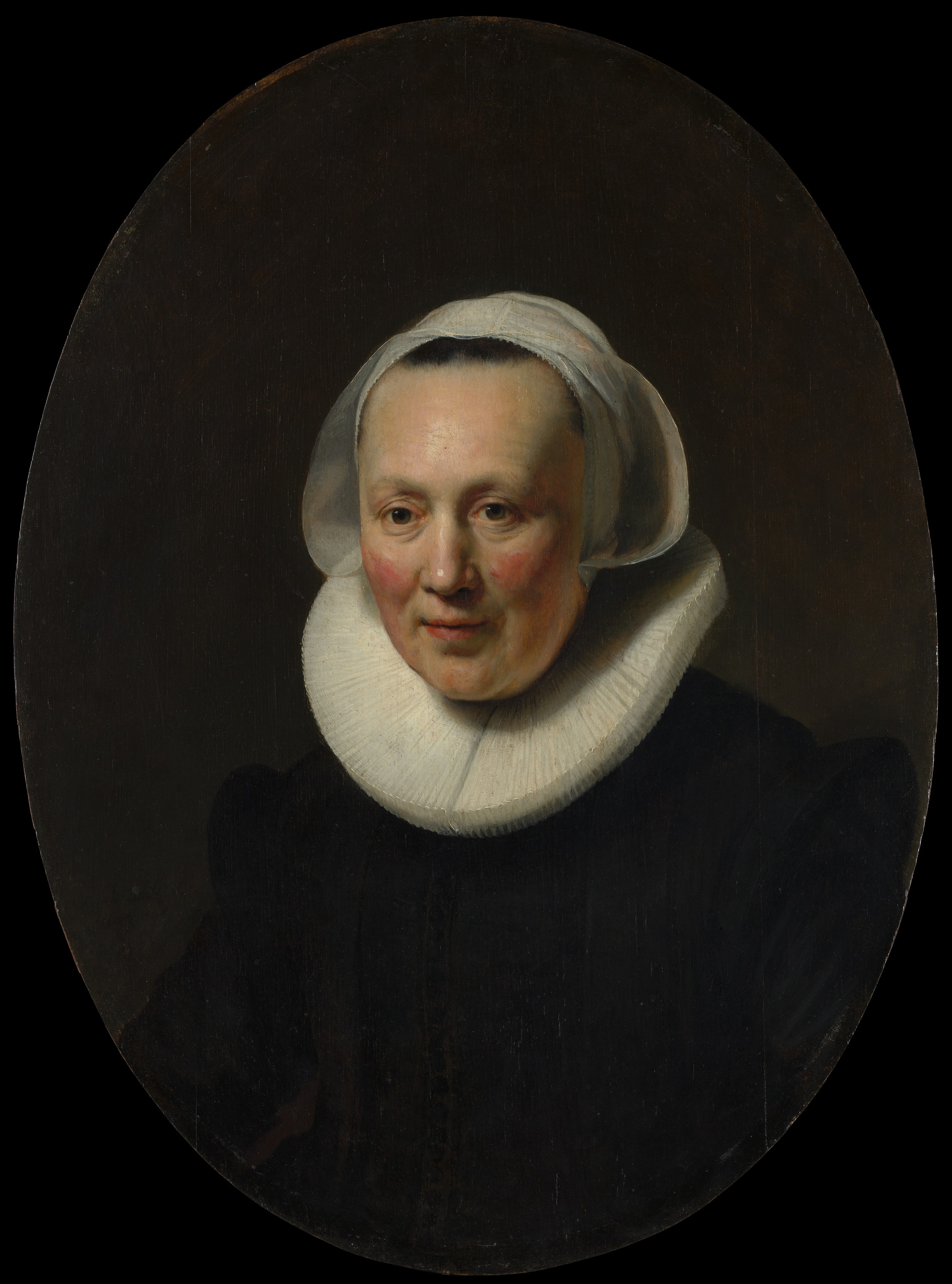
HdG 867, portrait of a woman (Metropolitan Museum of Art)

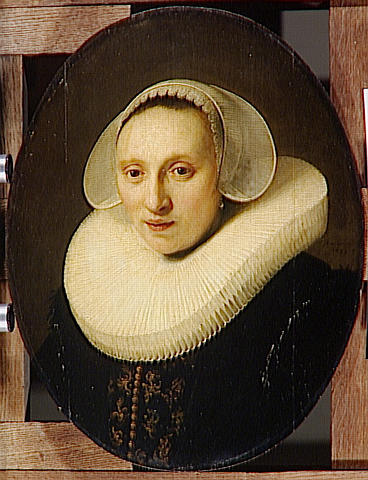
HdG 669, portrait of Cornelia Pronck (Louvre)

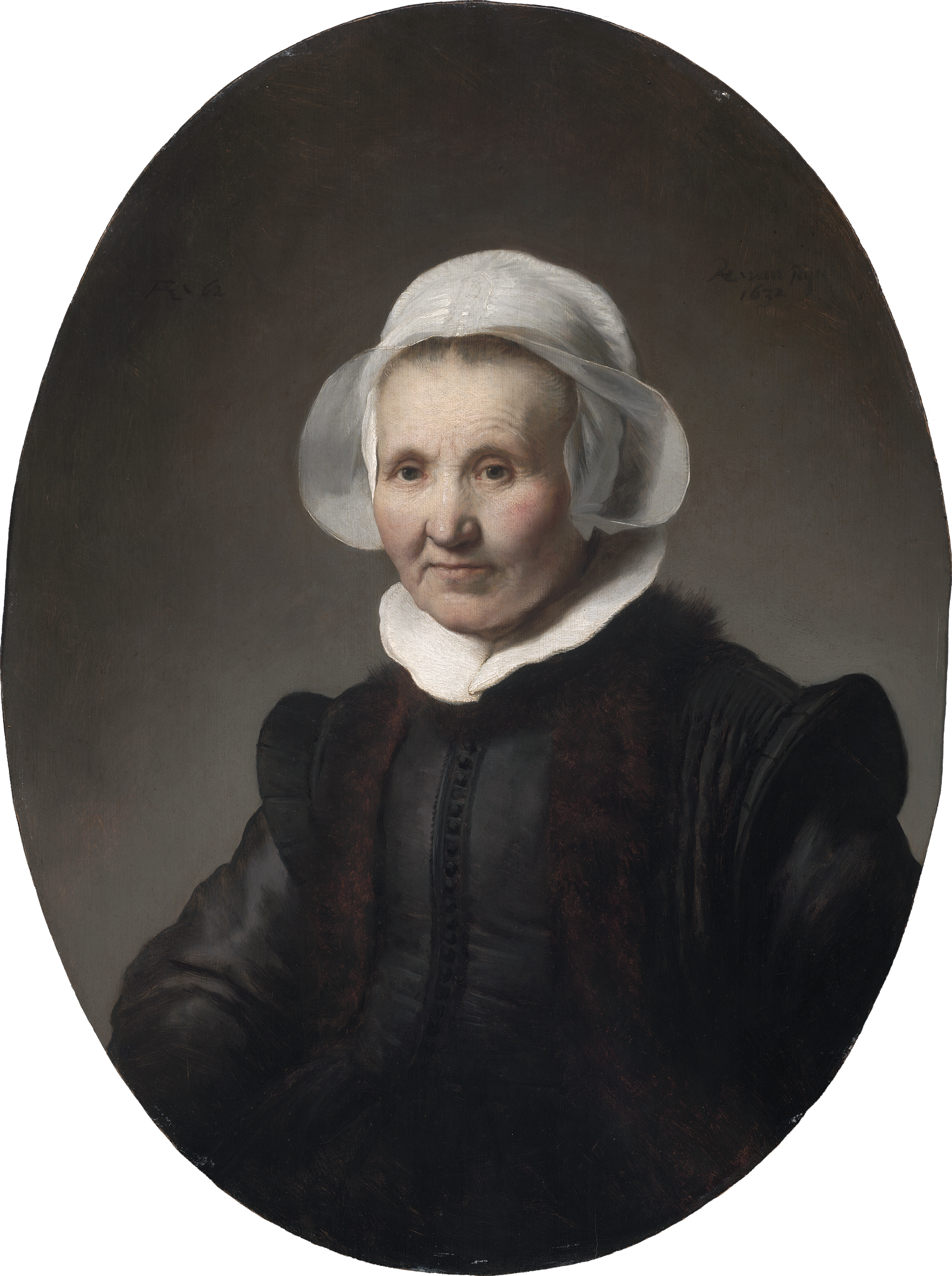
HdG 877, Aeltje Uylenburgh

== See also ==
- List of paintings by Rembrandt
