= The Vision of Zacharias in the Temple =

1633 painting by Rembrandt

Vision of Zacharias in the Temple
- Artist: Rembrandt
- Year: 1633
- Medium: oil on panel
- Dimensions: 58 cm × 48 cm (23 in × 19 in)
- Owner: private collection

The Vision of Zacharias in the Temple is a 1633 painting by Rembrandt. It was re-attributed to him by the Rijksmuseum in 2026 after a two-year authentication process. It had been included in Rembrandt catalogues until 1960 and was lost sight of after it was sold in 1961 to a private collector.

Rembrandt was 27 when he created the painting, which depicts the Biblical scene when high priest Zacharias is told by the Archangel Gabriel that despite their age, he and his wife will have a son, John the Baptist, (Luke 1:5–7). A light in the upper right hand corner of the painting depicts the arrival of Gabriel.

This painting was documented by Hofstede de Groot in 1915, who wrote:

72. ZACHARIAS IN THE TEMPLE. Sm. 135 ; B.-HdG. 42. — He stands turned to the right, almost in profile, holding with both hands an open folio. He has a full grey beard and wears a rich and fantastic priestly costume, consisting of a long white under-garment with wide sleeves and over it a light gold-embroidered mantle fastened with a brooch. He has a head-dress shaped like a helmet and adorned with gold ; a long veil falls down from the back of it. On the right is an octagonal table with a greyish-green cloth ; on it stands a large silver vase, near which is leaning the priest's staff. Farther back is an arm-chair. To the left, behind the prophet, is a dark curtain, apparently concealing a throne or altar. A small full-length figure. Painted about 1631-32. The figure of the priest is repeated very nearly in Rembrandt's etching "The Circumcision," Bartsch 48 [Hind 19] ; in this he holds a staff, and smoke rises from the vase on the table.

Signed on the right at foot, " Rembrandt f." ; oak panel, 23 inches by 19 inches.

An old copy is in the Schwerin Museum, 1882 catalogue, No. 577, doubtfully attributed to Salomon Koninck.

Exhibited at Amsterdam in the Rembrandt Exhibition, 1898, No. 19, and by the dealers Fred. Muller and Co., 1906, No. 107; and in Paris, 1911, No. 115.

Sale. — De Julienne, Paris, March 30, 1767 (150 francs) — according to Dutuit.

In the collection of Jeremiah Harman, 1836 (Sm.).

Sale. — J. Harman, London, May 17, 1844 (£157 : 10s., Baillie). In the collection of Captain E. Purvis, 1875.

In the possession of the Paris dealer C. Sedelmeyer, "Catalogue of 300 Paintings," No. 117.

In the collection of A. Lehmann, Paris.

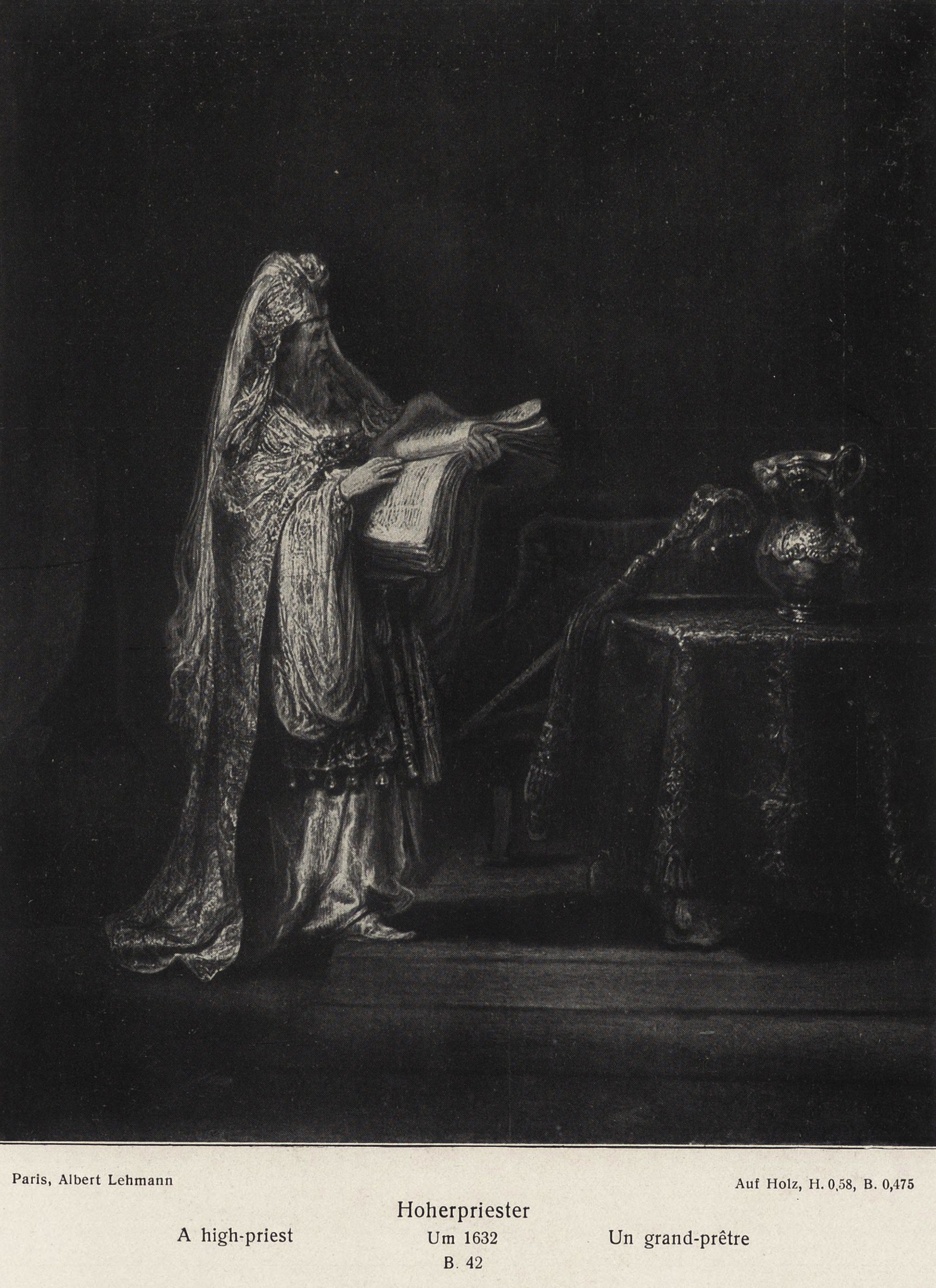
Photo of this painting in the Rembrandt catalogue raisonné, 1908

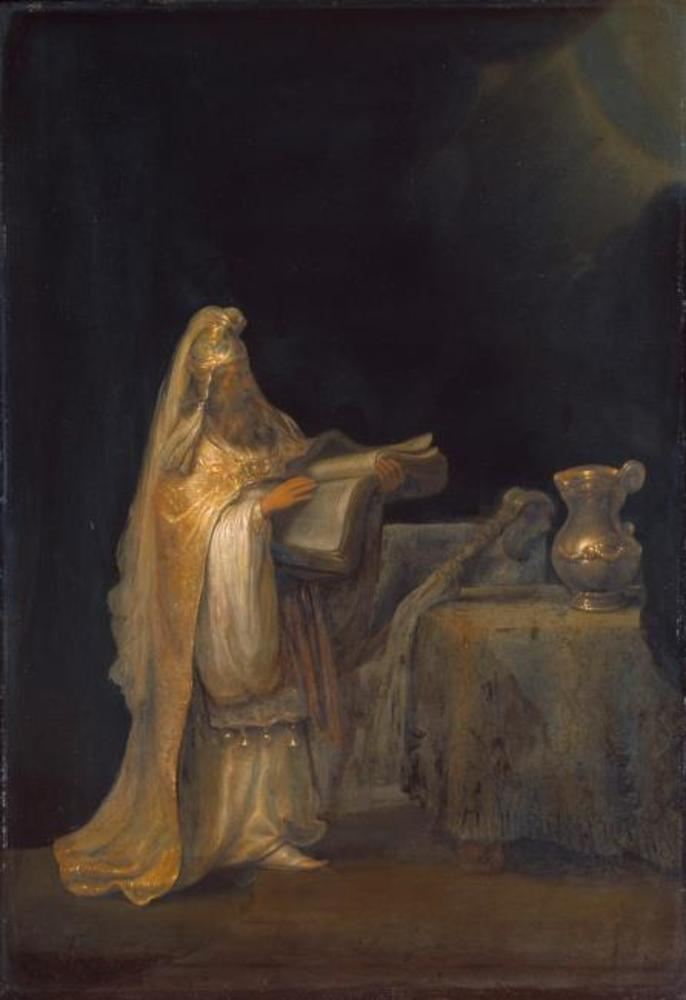
Copy attributed to Salomon Koninck in Staatliches Museum Schwerin

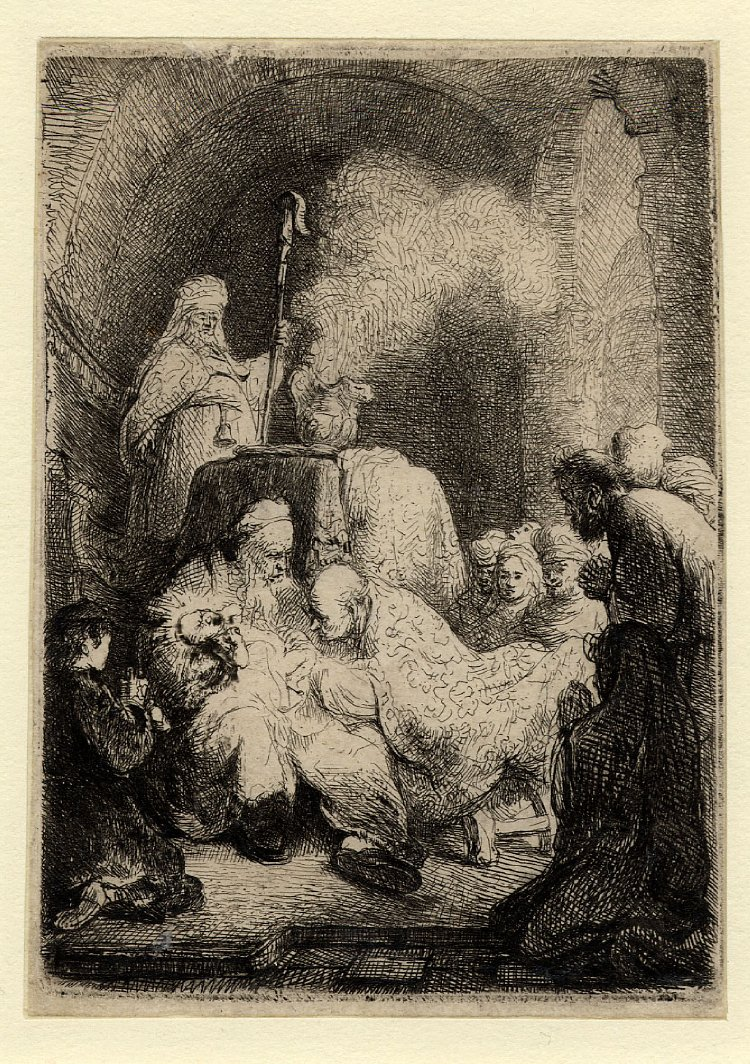
Rembrandt etching of the Circumcision of Christ showing the same figure of the high priest

It is now on long-term loan to the Rijksmuseum and will be displayed from March 2026.

== See also ==
- List of paintings by Rembrandt

== Sources ==
Jonathan Bikker and Petria Noble, 'Rembrandt’s "Vision of Zacharias in the Temple"’, The Burlington Magazine Vol. 168 / No. 1476 (March 2026), pp. 218-229
