= Portrait of a Woman Wearing a Gold Chain =

1634 painting by Rembrandt

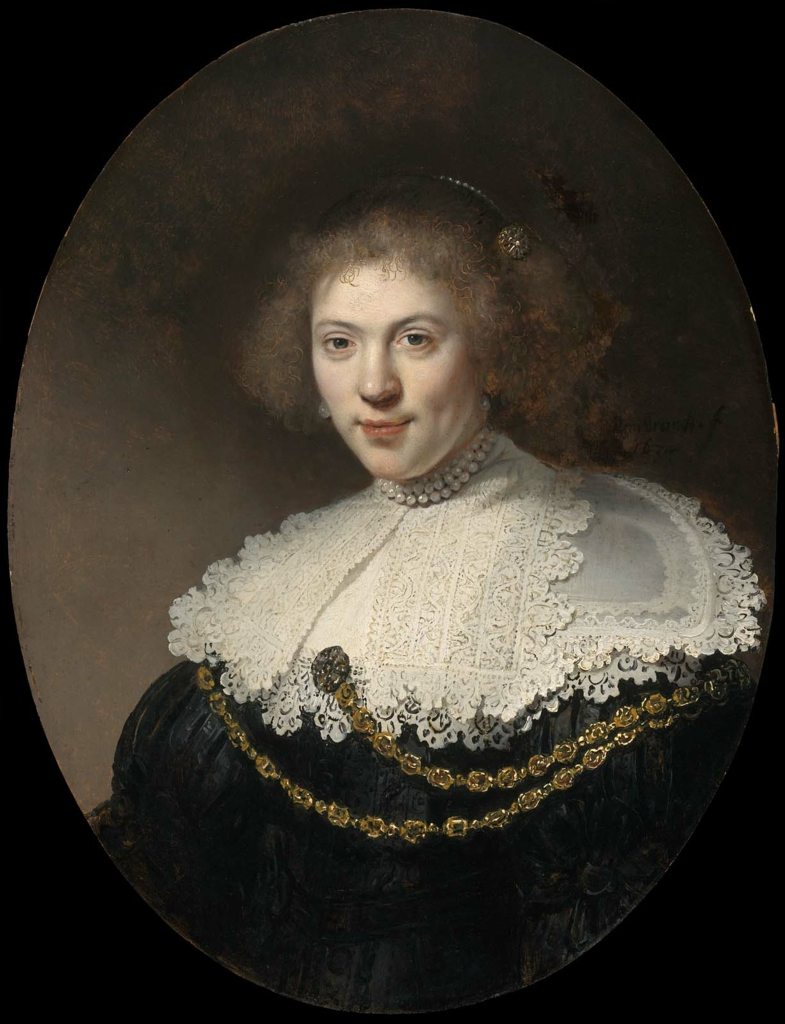
- Artist: Rembrandt
- Year: 1634
- Medium: oil paint, oak panel
- Dimensions: 69.5 cm (27.4 in) × 53 cm (21 in)
- Location: Museum of Fine Arts
- Accession no.: 93.1474
- Identifiers: RKDimages ID: 32068

Portrait of a Woman Wearing a Gold Chain is a 1634 portrait painted by Rembrandt. It shows a smiling woman with a triple lace collar. It is in the collection of the Museum of Fine Arts, Boston.

== Description ==
Several oval portraits of a woman of 17th-century Amsterdam have survived, and sometimes these were pendants and sometimes they were individual portraits. This painting, as well as its pendant, has been attributed to Rembrandt since the 19th-century, but doubts have been raised by the Rembrandt Research Project. This painting came into the collection via Mrs. Frederick L. Ames, in the name of Frederick L. Ames.

This painting was documented by Hofstede de Groot in 1914, who wrote; "848. A YOUNG WOMAN WITH A TRIPLE LACE COLLAR. Bode 307; Dut. 236; Wb. 320; B.-HdG. 112. About twenty-five. Half-length, without hands; life size. She is inclined to the left and looks straight out of the picture. She has a pale and delicate complexion and an amiable expression. In her rather fair, short, curly hair is a rosette on the left side; behind it is a pearl comb fastening the hair. Round her neck is a triple string of pearls; in each ear is a pearl. She wears a black gown with slashed sleeves. A long gold chain is twice wound across the bosom and the shoulders, and fastened with a rosette to the lace collar. Full light falls from the left. Uniform greenish-grey background. Painted about 1634. The sitter was formerly identified as Margaretha de Vlaming van Oudtshoorn, second wife of Nicolaes Tulp. [Pendant to 732.] Oval oak panel, 26 1/2 inches by 21 inches. Mentioned by Vosmaer, pp. 113, 147, 503; Bode, p. 405; Dutuit, p. 52; Michel, p. 118 [91, 443]. In the collection of Baron de Seilliere, Paris. In the collection of the Princesse de Sagan, Paris; who sold it in 1891 to Cottier. In the possession of the New York dealer Cottier. In the collection of Frederick Ames, Boston, whose widow gave it to the Museum in 1893. In the Boston Museum."

This painting was donated along with its pendant:

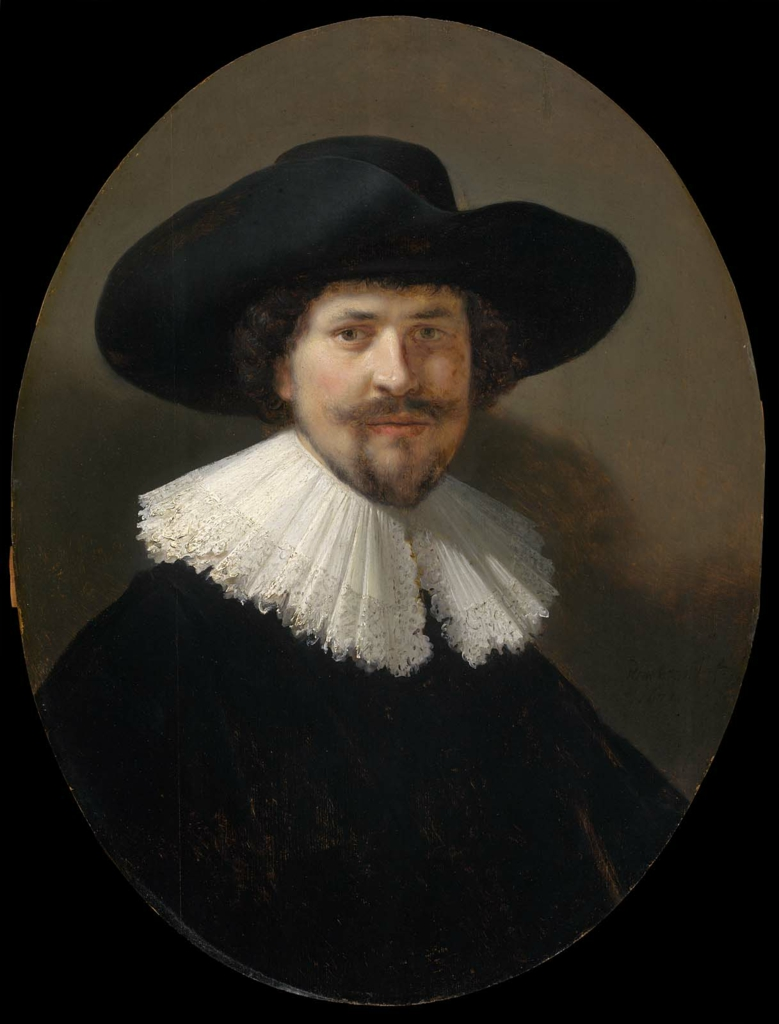

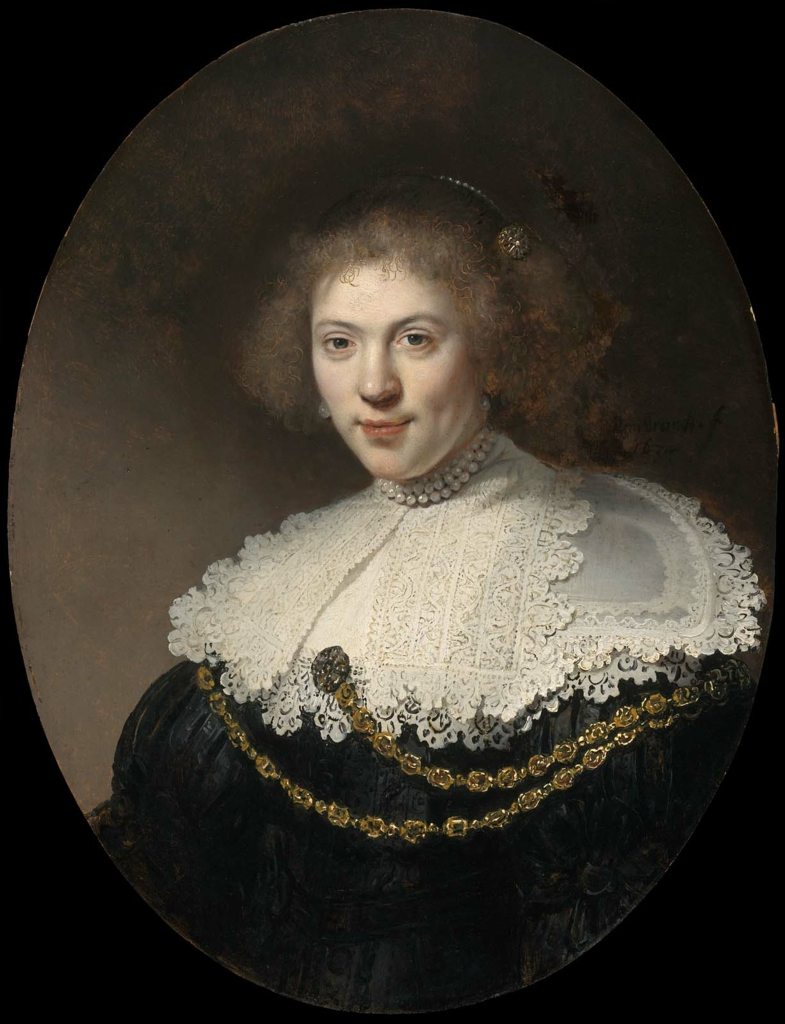

Her flat lace collar in layers is the style that existed in the 1630s and 1640s alongside the style of millstone collars. Compare Rembrandt's Oval Portrait of a Woman from the same period. Other notable oval portraits of women of North Holland with flat collars from the same period are:

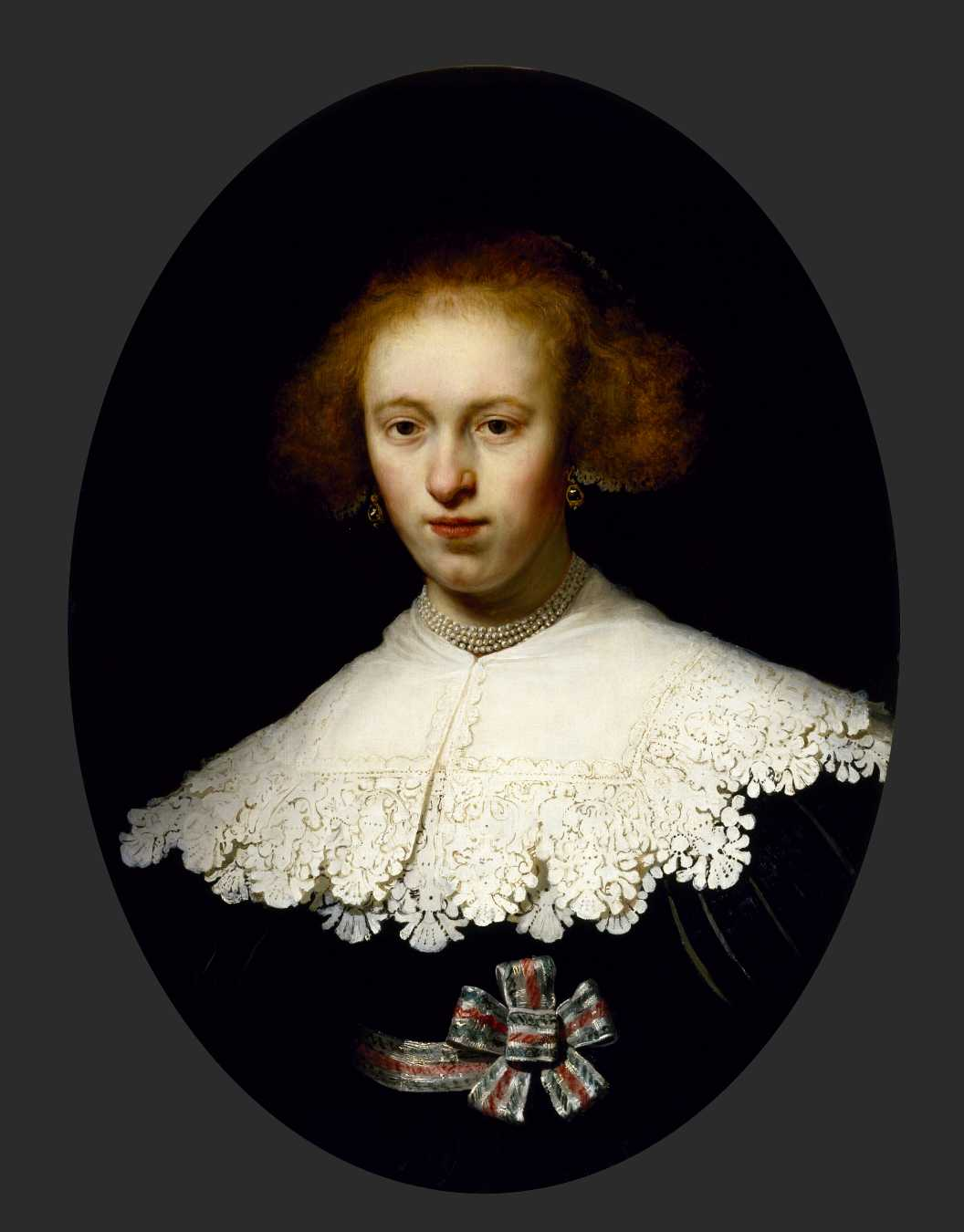
Portrait of a Young Woman, 1633 by Rembrandt

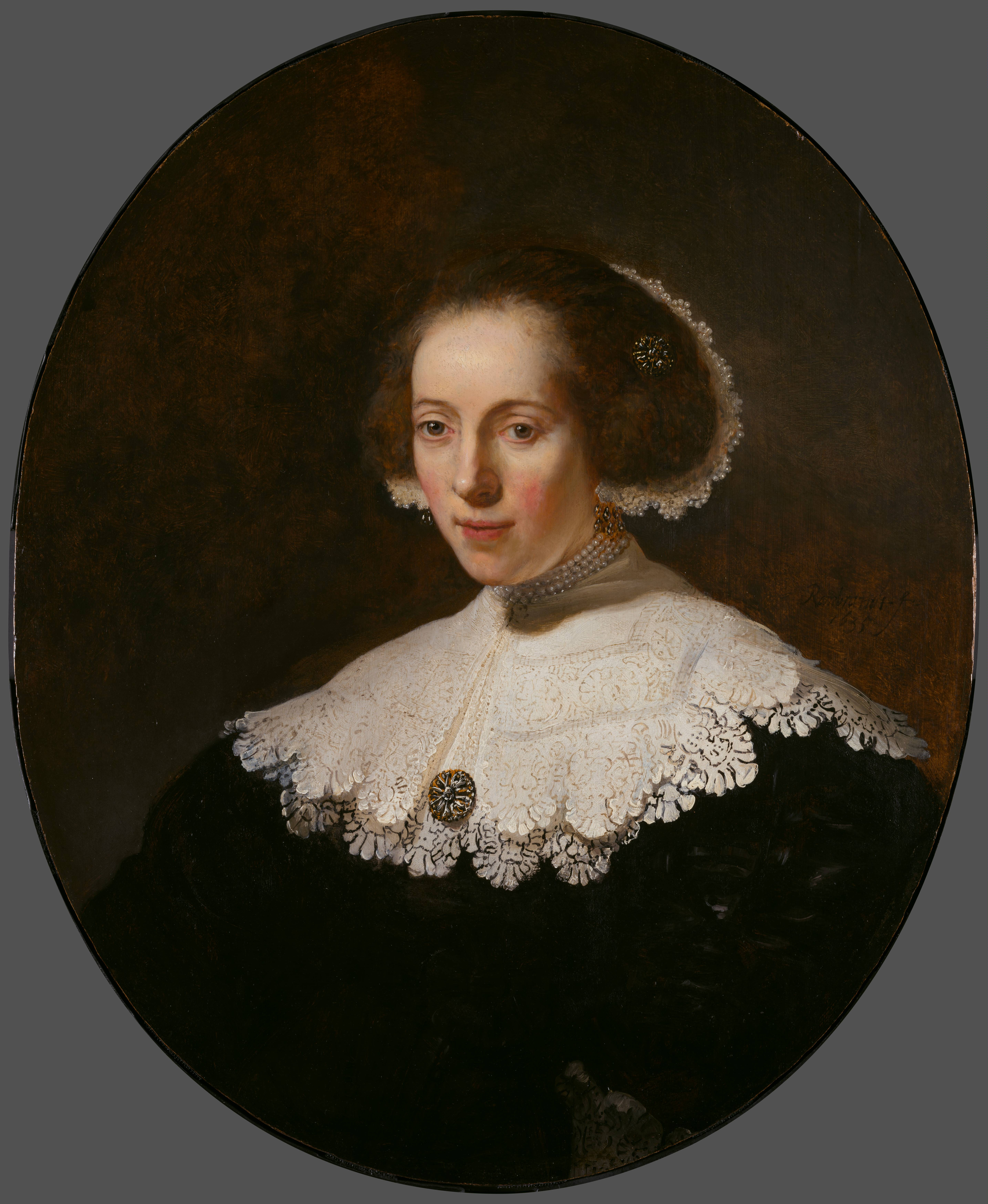
Portrait of a Young Woman, 1635 by Rembrandt

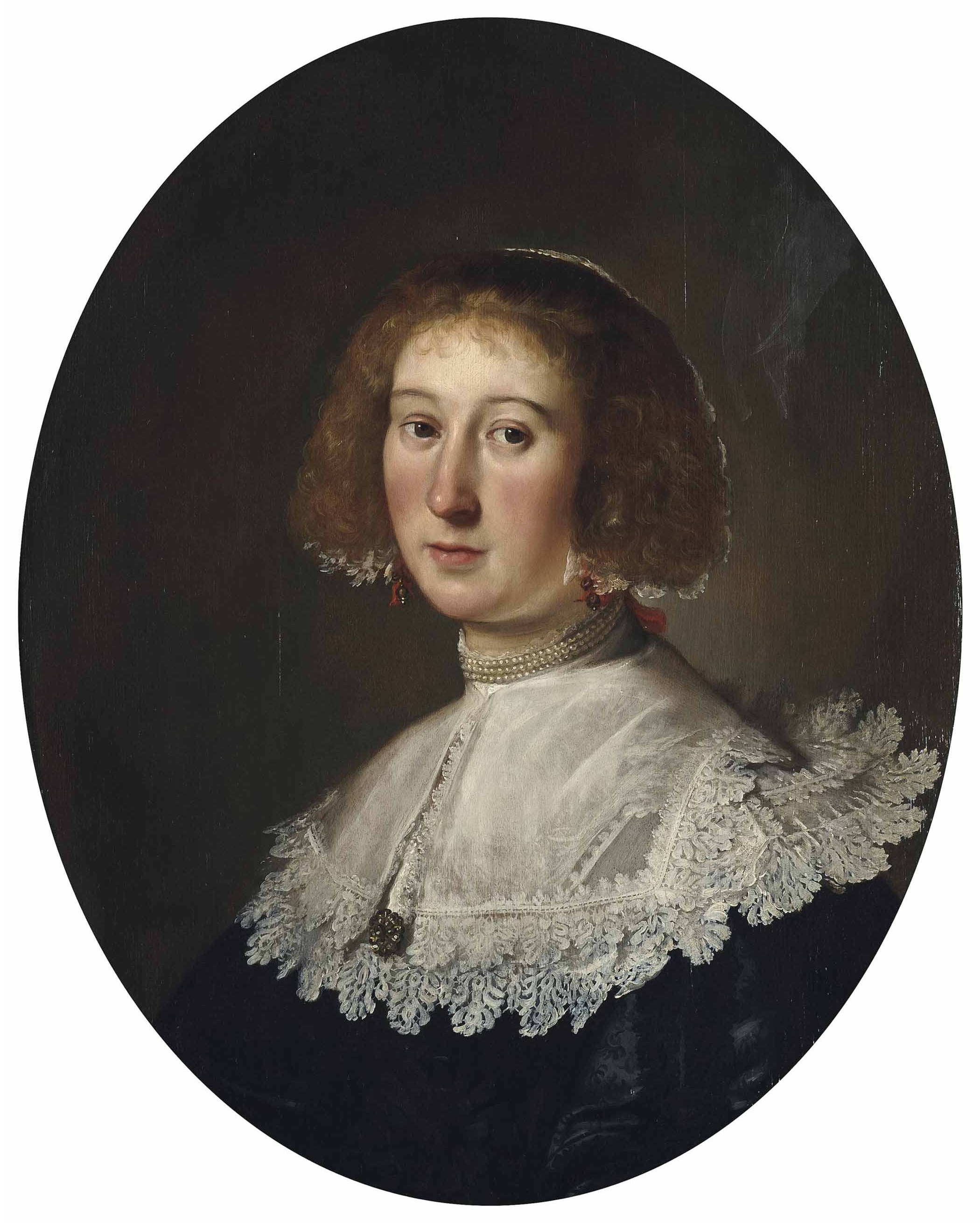
Portrait of a Young Woman, by Paulus Moreelse

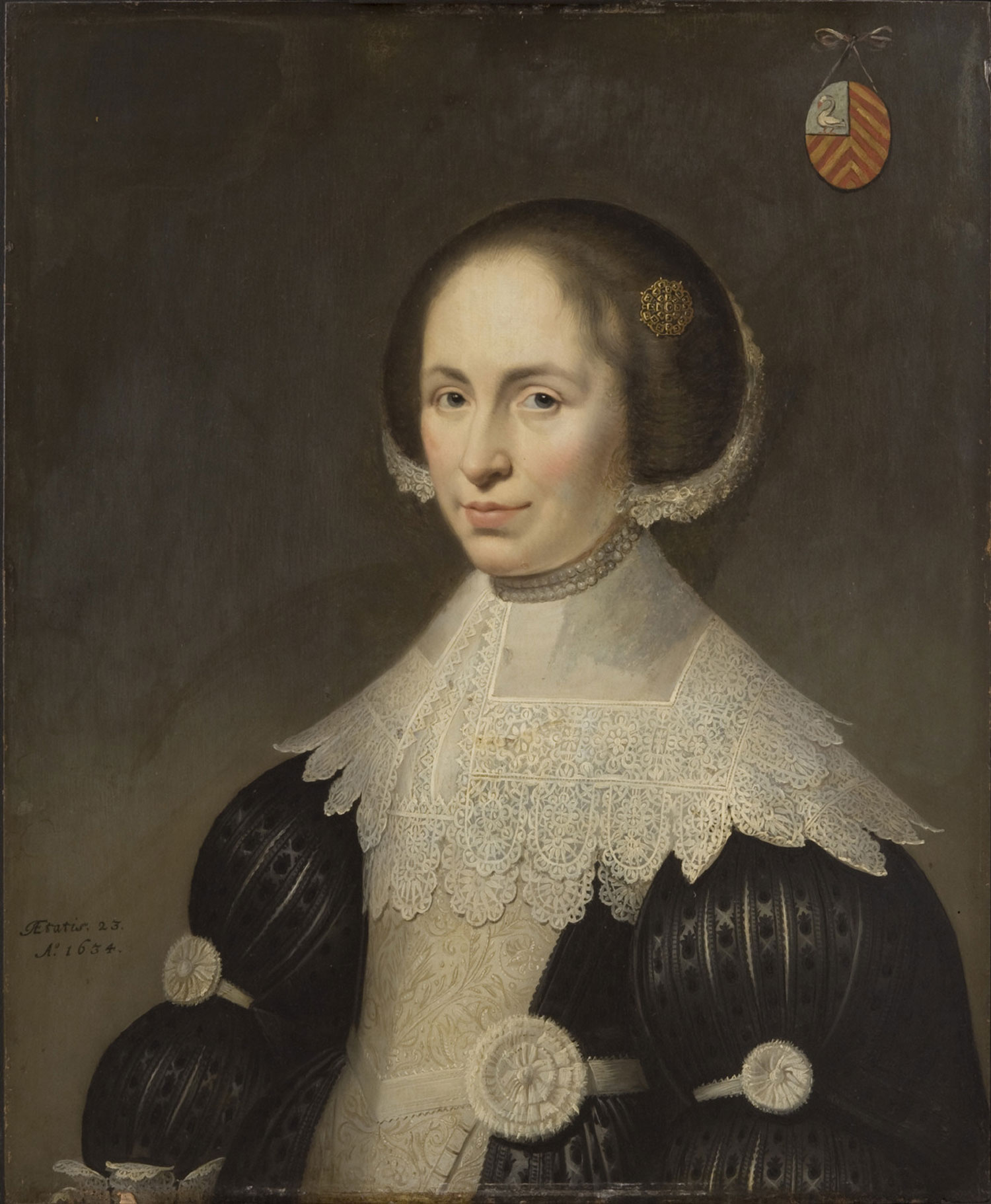
Portrait of Gertrude Teding van Berkhout, dated 1634 by Jan van Ravesteyn

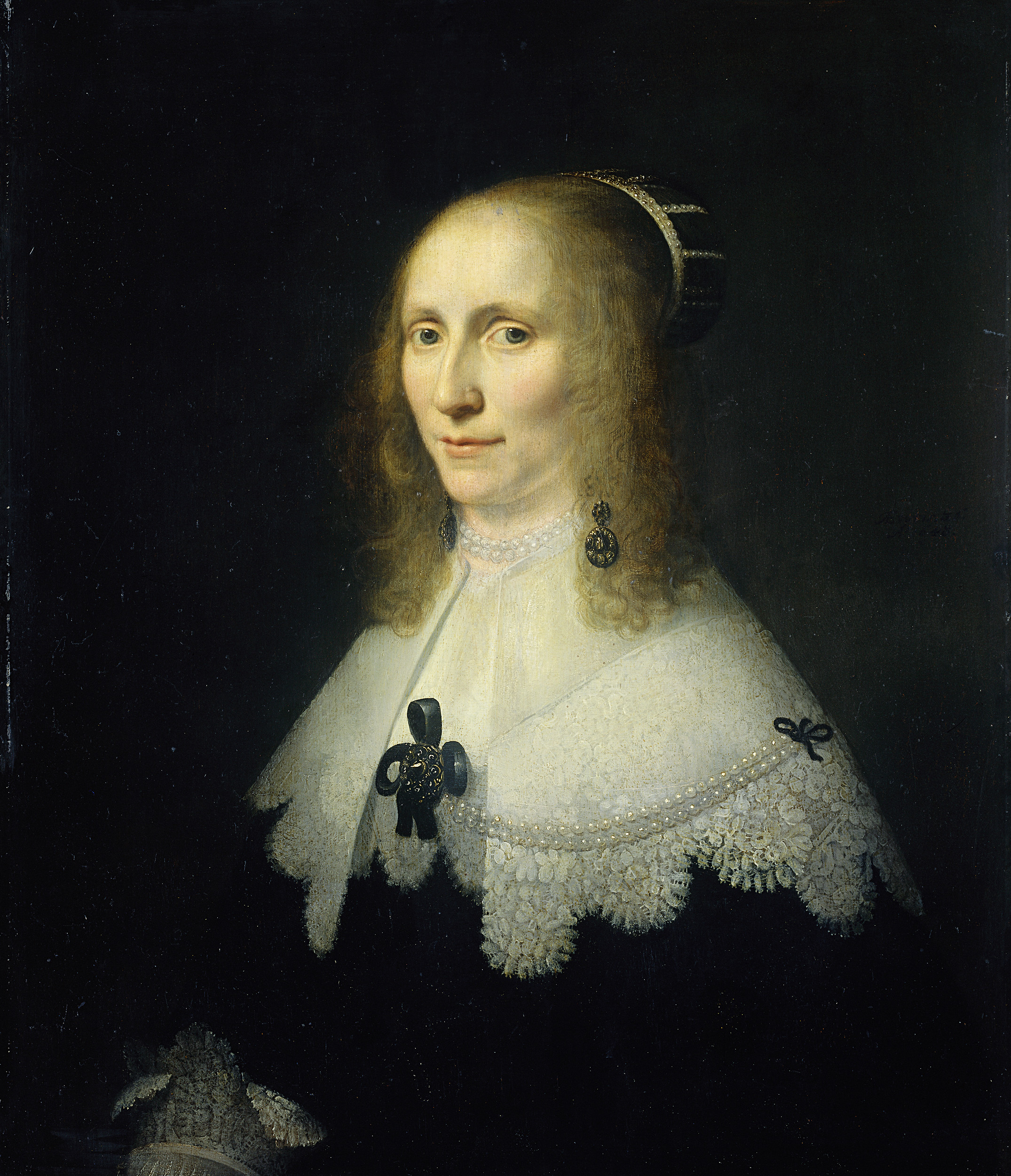
Portrait of Cornelia Tedingh van Berckhout, 1648 after Michiel van Mierevelt

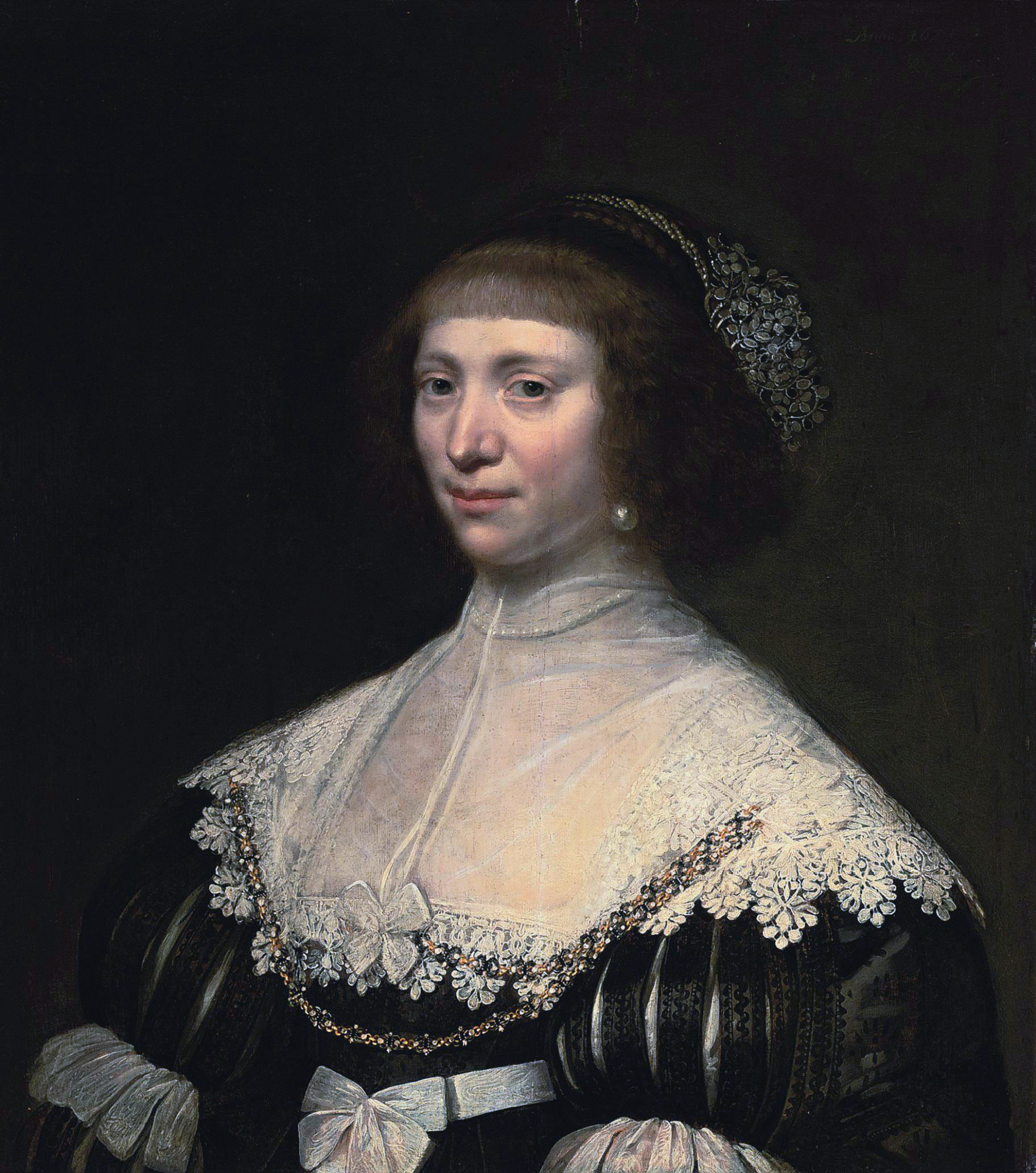
Portrait of a Lady, 1631 by Jan van Ravesteyn
