= Portrait of a 62-year-old Woman =

1632 painting by Rembrandt van Rijn

Portrait of a 62-year-old Woman, possibly Aeltje Pietersdr Uylenburgh
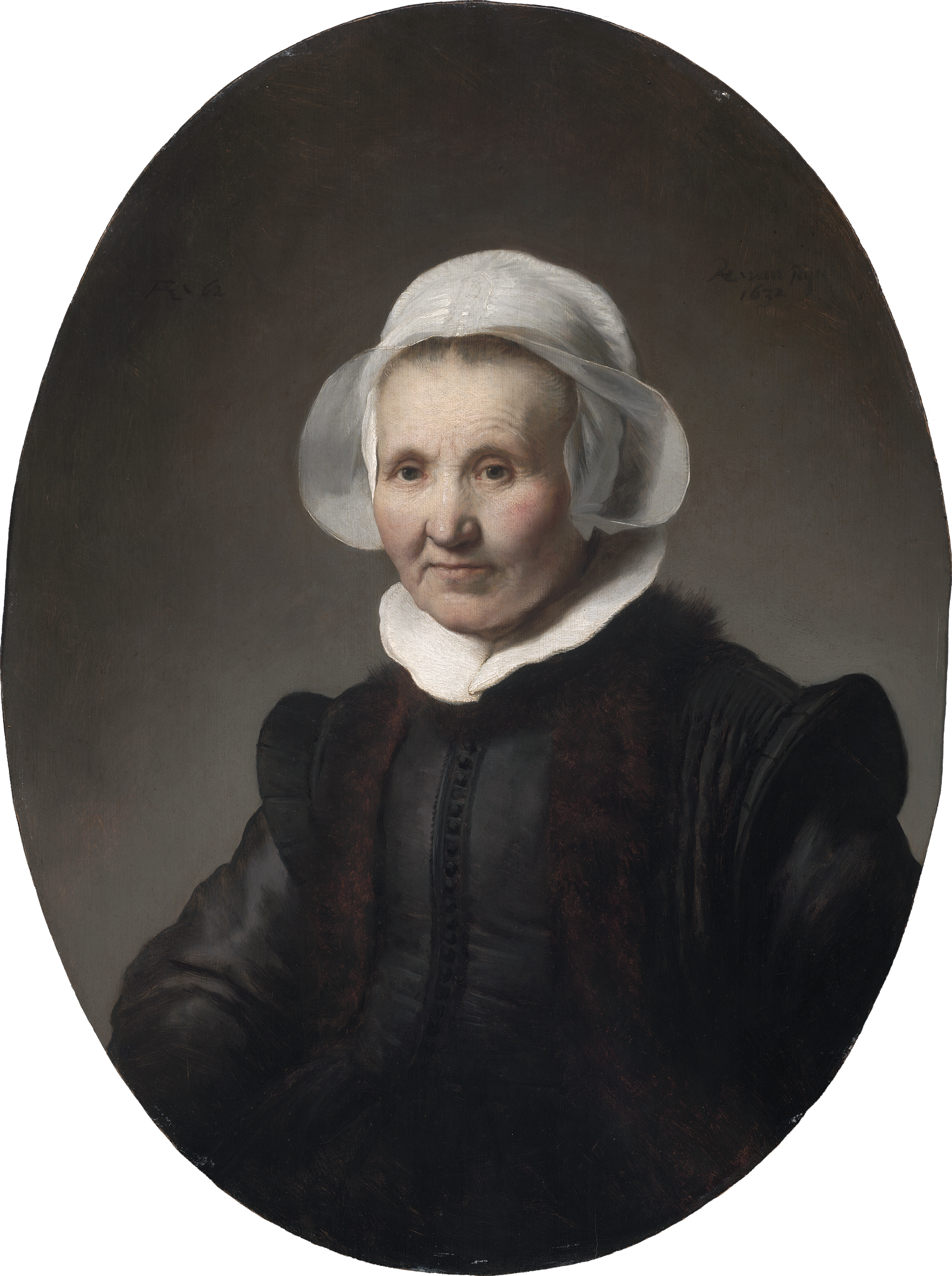
- Artist: Rembrandt
- Year: 1632
- Medium: oil paint, oak panel
- Dimensions: 29 in (74 cm) × 22 in (56 cm)
- Accession: L-R 249.2017

Portrait of a 62-year-old Woman, possibly Aeltje Pietersdr Uylenburgh is a 1632 portrait painting painted by Rembrandt. It is an oil on panel in oval format depicting an elderly woman with a small and sober millstone collar. It is in the collection of the Museum of Fine Arts, Boston.

== Description ==
Several oval portraits of a woman of 17th-century Amsterdam have survived, and sometimes these were pendants and sometimes they were individual portraits. This painting, without a pendant, has been attributed to Rembrandt since the 19th century. This painting came into the collection via the major gift of Rose-Marie and Eijk van Otterloo, after being on loan from them for an extended period of time.

This painting was documented by Hofstede de Groot in 1914, who wrote:

877. AN OLD LADY WITH A WHITE CAP. Bode 301; Dut. 329; Wb. 315 and 456; B.-HdG. 85. About sixty. Half-length; life size. She sits, inclined to the left, looking out of the picture. Over her bright black gown she wears a cape trimmed with dark fur. She has a flat outstanding ruff; her hair is covered by a close-fitting cap with projecting side-flaps. Grey background. Signed to the right at top, "R H L van Rijn 1632"; oval oak panel, 30 inches by 22 inches. Mentioned by Vosmaer, p. 495; Michel, p. 435. In the possession of Sm., London, before 1836 [priced at 200]; sold by him in 1835 to Brondgeest, according to a note in his own copy of his catalogue. In the collection of Baron Alphonse de Rothschild, Paris. In the collection of Baron Henri de Rothschild, Paris.

== Copies ==
This portrait was copied and signed H Roos by Johann Heinrich Roos while he was a student of Rembrandt. That copy later came into the collection of Henriette Amalie of Anhalt-Dessau. Another copy was made presumably while the painting was in the British Coesvelt collection and has been in Felbrigg Hall since 1764, when it was recorded as a picture by Rembrandt of his mother.

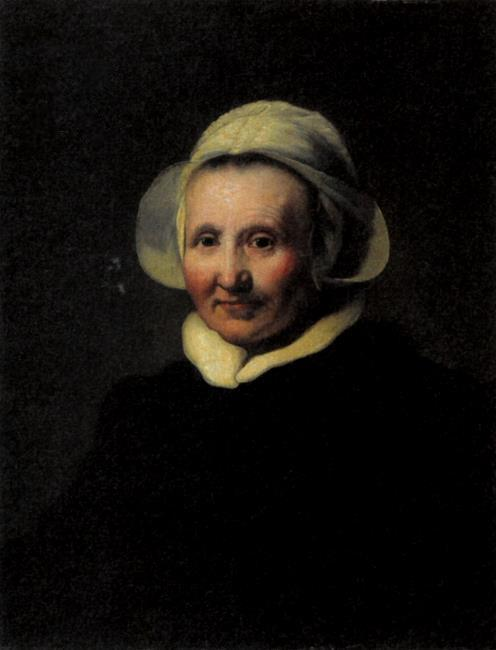
Version by Johann Heinrich Roos

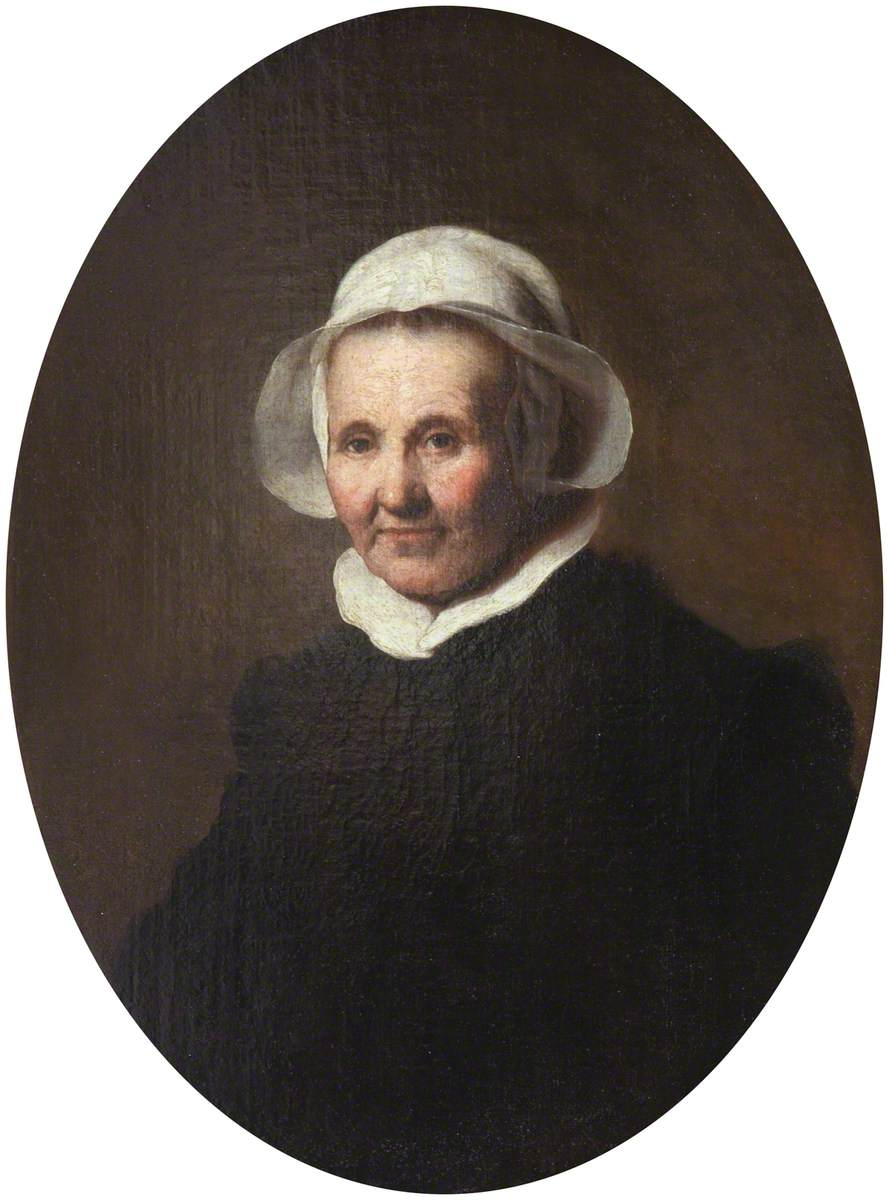
Version in Felbrigg Hall

== Sitter ==
In 2000 the portrait was sold at Christie's in London as a portrait of the wife of the theologian Johannes Sylvius for nearly 20 million pounds. Aeltje Pietersdr Uylenburgh lived in the minister's residence of the Oude Kerk and was the daughter of Saskia van Uylenburgh's uncle Pieter, making them first cousins, though Aeltje was a generation older and probably served as a guide for the 21-year-old Saskia on her first visit to Amsterdam in the Spring of 1633.

If indeed it is she, though its pendant is lost, an etching of her husband by Rembrandt still exists (the lost original painting would have been reversed so he faced her).
