= Head of Christ (disambiguation) =

Head of Christ is a 1940 portrait painting of Jesus by Warner Sallman.

Head of Christ may also refer to:

- Head of Christ (Cascalls), an alabaster sculpture of c. 1352 in the Museu Nacional d'Art de Catalunya, Barcelona
- Head of Christ (Correggio), a painting of 1521 in the Getty Museum, Los Angeles
- Head of Christ (Leonardo), a chalk and pastel study of c. 1494 in the Pinacoteca di Brera, Milan
- Head of Christ (Rembrandt), a painting of 1648 in oils on panel in the Gemäldegalerie, Berlin
- Head of Christ (Rembrandt, Louvre Abu Dhabi), a painting of c. 1648
- Head of Christ (Rembrandt, New York), a painting of the 1650s in the Metropolitan Museum of Art
- Head of Christ (Rembrandt, Philadelphia), a 17th-century painting in the Philadelphia Museum of Art

== See also ==
- Head of the Redeemer, a painting of 1500–1502 by Giovanni Bellini
