= Head of Christ (Rembrandt) =

1648 painting by Rembrandt

- Christuskop
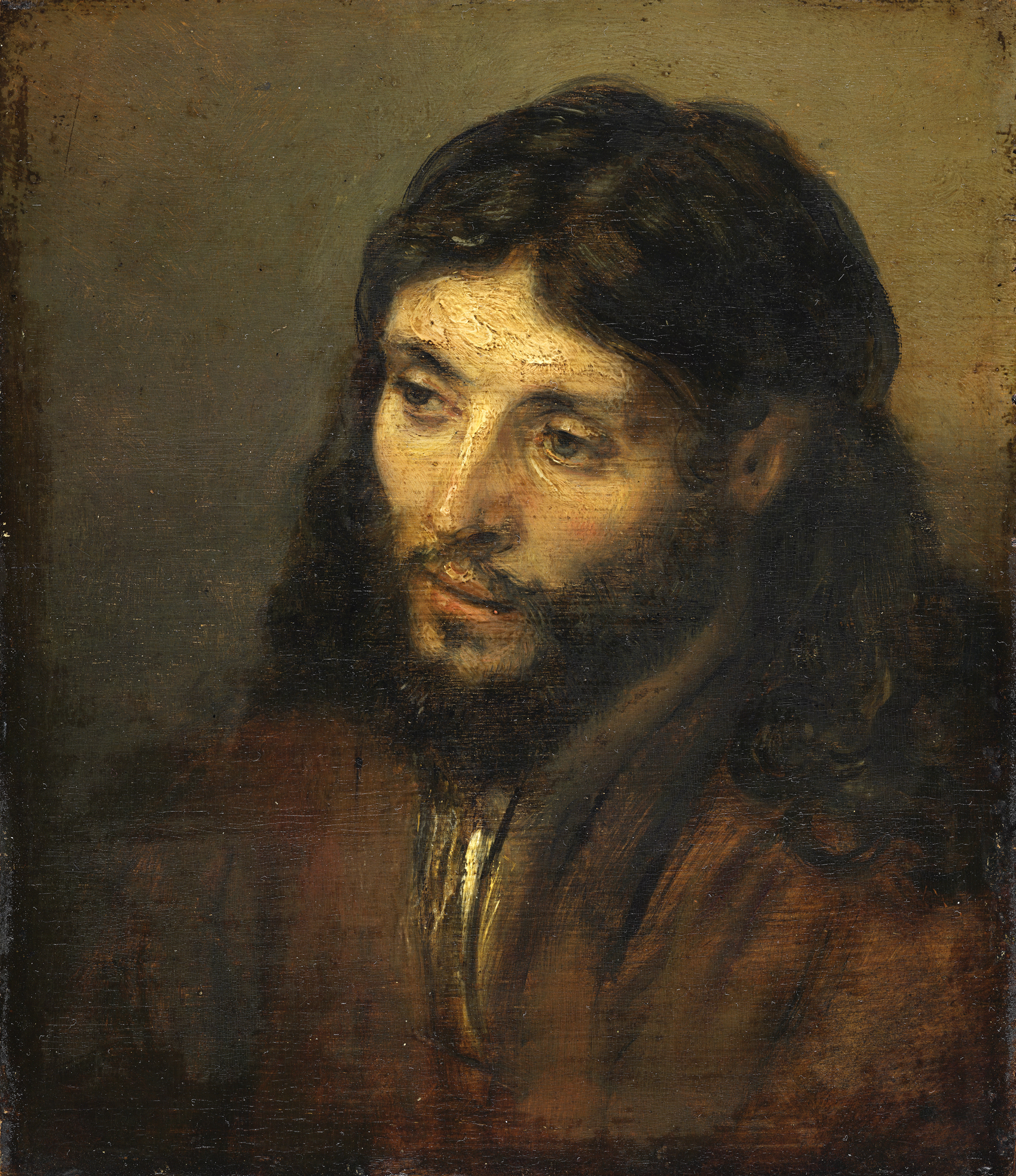
- Artist: Rembrandt
- Year: 1640s
- Medium: oil paint, oak panel
- Dimensions: 25 cm (9.8 in) × 21.7 cm (8.5 in)
- Location: Gemäldegalerie
- Owner: Charles Sedelmeyer
- Collection: Gemäldegalerie, Bode Museum, Charles Sedelmeyer collection
- Accession no.: 811C
- Identifiers: RKDimages ID: 202397; Bildindex der Kunst und Architektur ID: 02552505

The Head of Christ is a 1648 oil-on-panel painting by the Dutch artist Rembrandt. It is now in the Gemäldegalerie in Berlin.

== Description ==
There are multiple versions of Rembrandt's Head of Christ which are in the possession internationally of cultural institutions and individuals. During the course of the 19th-century it was supposed that these similar heads were based on a "Jewish model" (leading some to suppose that Rembrandt himself was Jewish, since he lived in what was considered the Jewish quarter of Amsterdam). These heads in varying poses were possibly created as devotional objects. Today about a dozen are known, but only this one is considered by the Rembrandt Research Project to be by the master himself. It is one of the paintings that were in the large Rodolphe Kann collection purchased as a whole by Joseph Duveen and came into the collection via a bequest by Herr and Frau Martin Bromberg of Hamburg.

This painting was documented by Hofstede de Groot in 1914, who wrote:

158. HEAD OF CHRIST. B.-HdG. 413. Turned three-quarters left. The head is slightly inclined. Long dark curls and a short full beard. In a reddish-brown cloak. Half-length, without the hands, about half life size. Painted about 1656-58. Oak panel, 10 inches by 8 inches. Mentioned by Michel, pp. 451, 443, 563 [270, 343, 435]. Sale. John Henderson, London, February 13, 1882. In the collection of Rodolphe Kann, Paris, 1907 catalogue, p. 72; bought as a whole in 1907 by the dealers Duveen Brothers. In the Kaiser Friedrich Museum, Berlin, 1911 catalogue, No. 811C; presented by Herr and Frau Martin Bromberg of Hamburg.

During WWII, the painting was stored in a vault along with most of the paintings that were in the Kaiser Friedrich Museum located at what is today the Bode Museum. After the war, it was recovered and returned to West Berlin, which is how it came to be in the collection of the Gemäldegalerie. In 1959, it was stolen, but recovered 2 years later. The painting was included in most Rembrandt catalogs of the 20th-century, only recently gaining its exclusive status as the only surviving copy by the master's hand in the RRP catalog. It is, however, still connected with Rembrandt's workshop and is grouped together with all the other versions. It was included in the 2011 exhibition "Rembrandt and the Face of Jesus" held in the Detroit Institute of Arts, Philadelphia Museum of Art and Louvre April 21, 2011 – February 12, 2012, cat. no. 35.

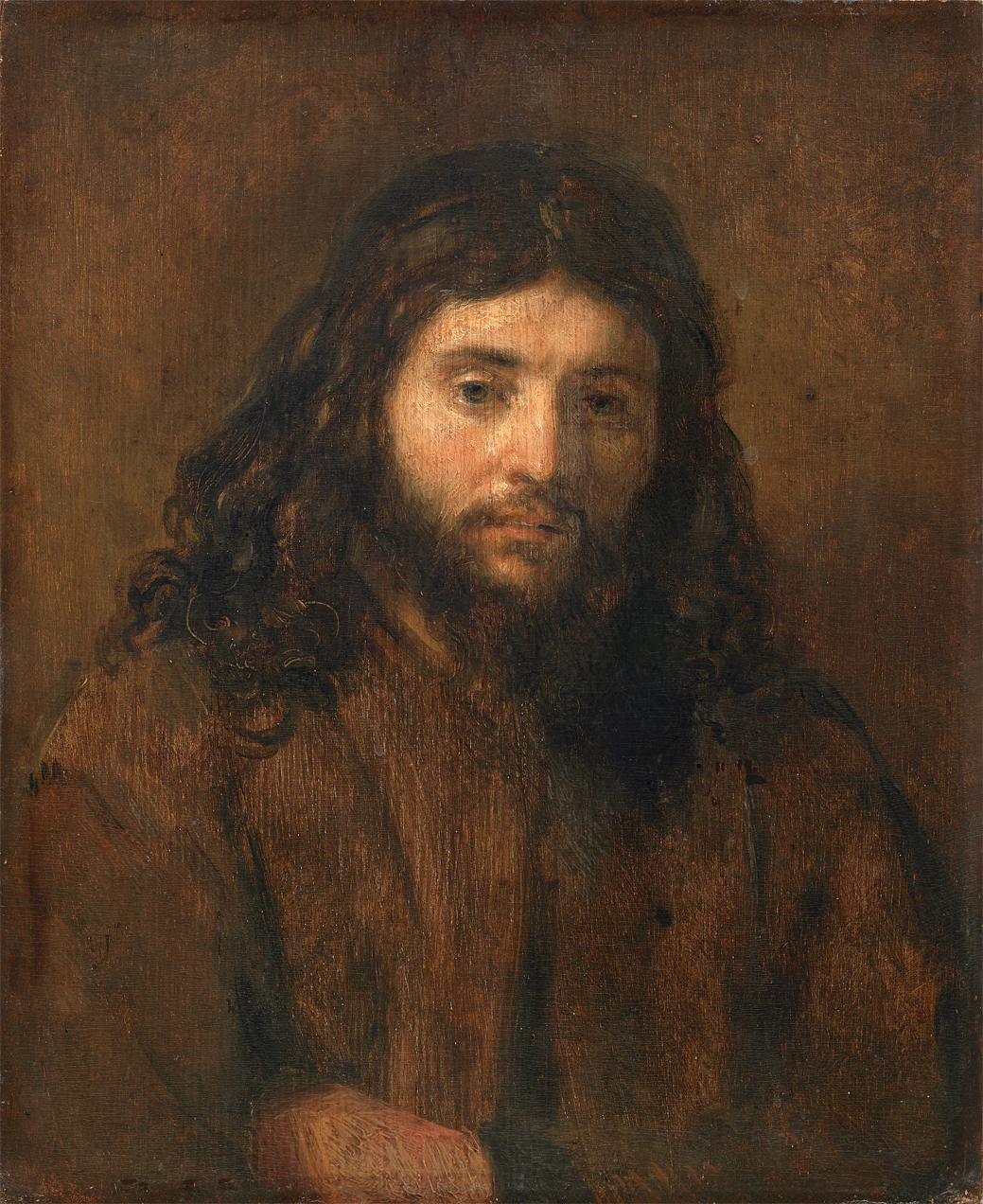
Bredius

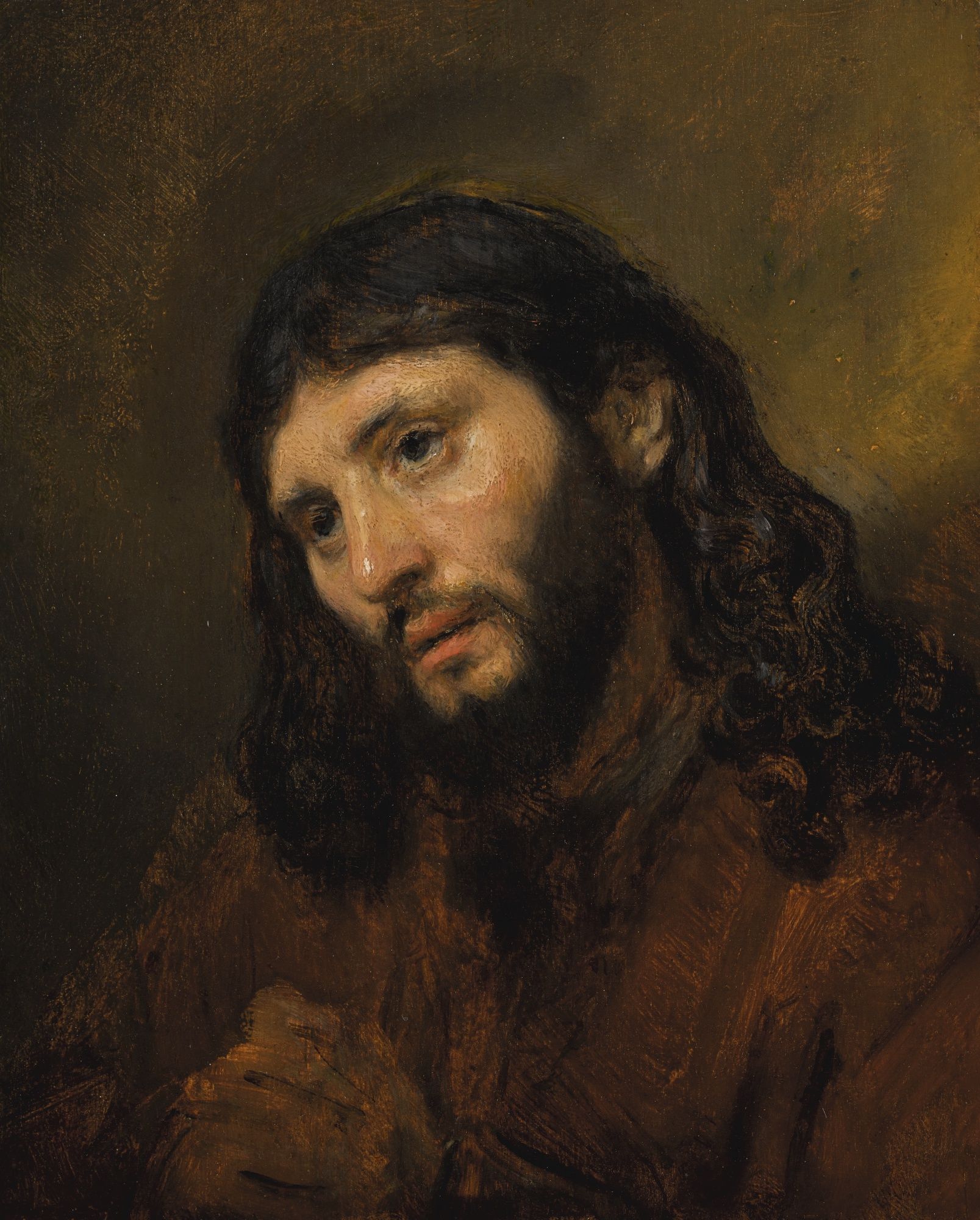
Louvre Abu Dhabi

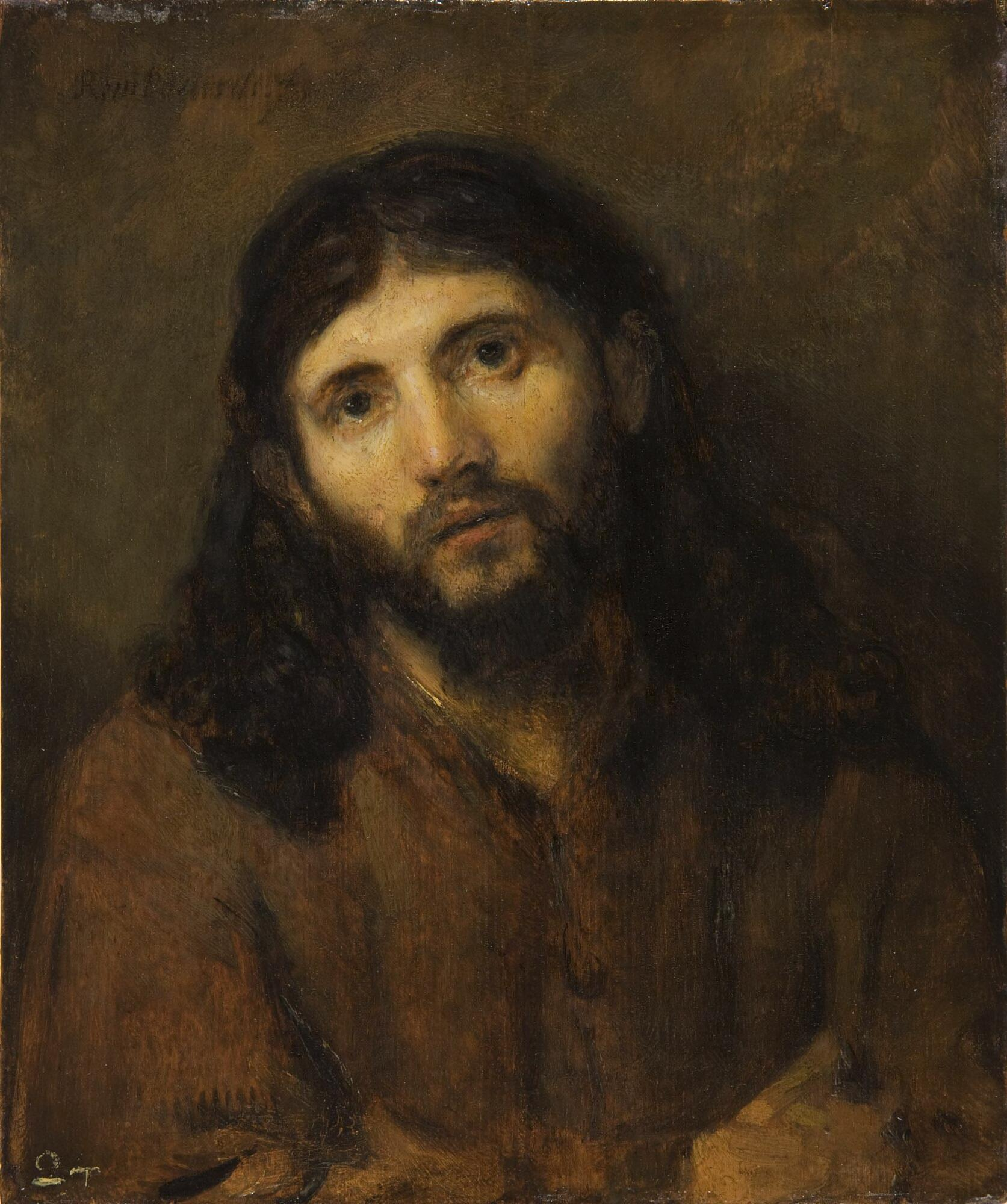
DIA

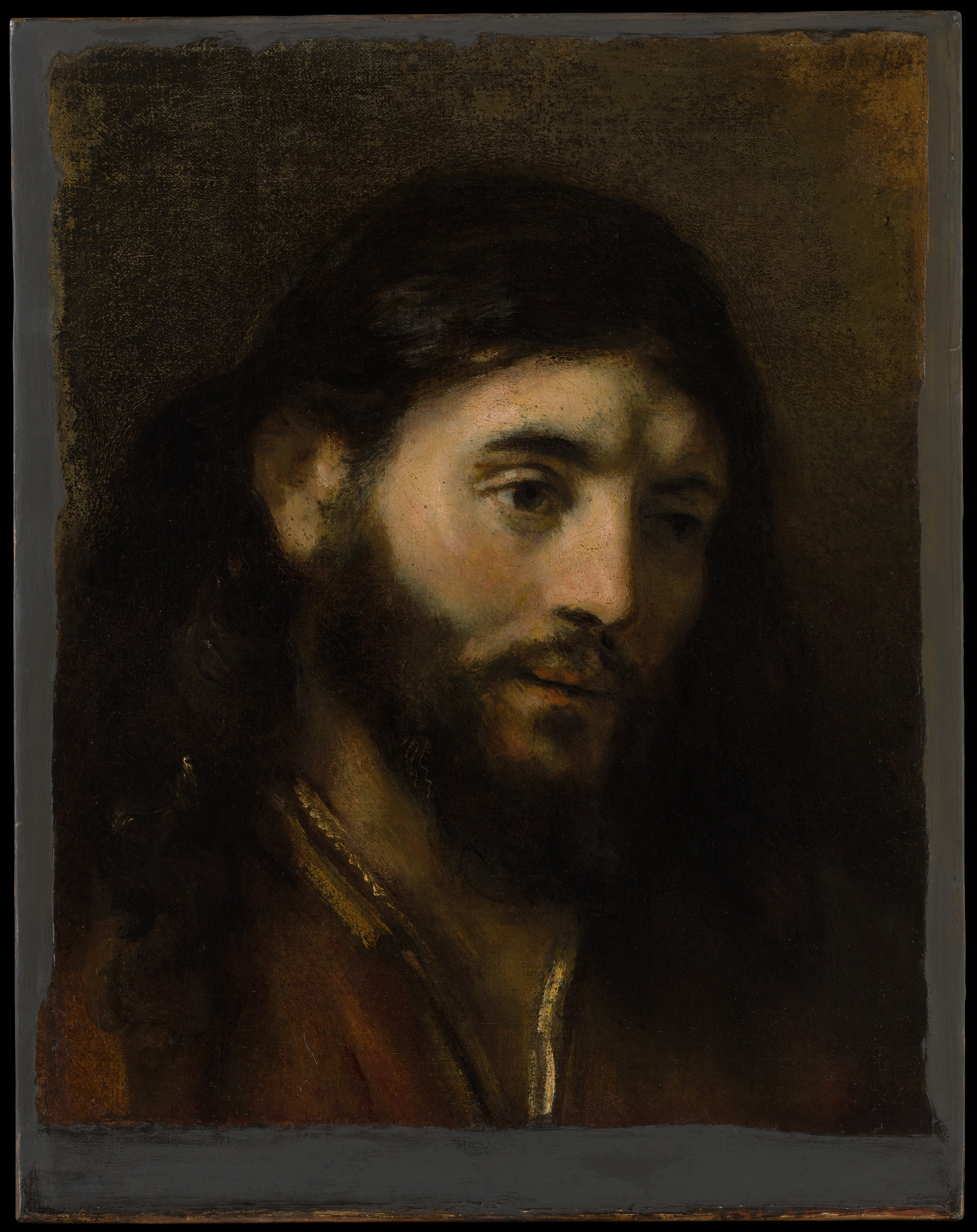
New York

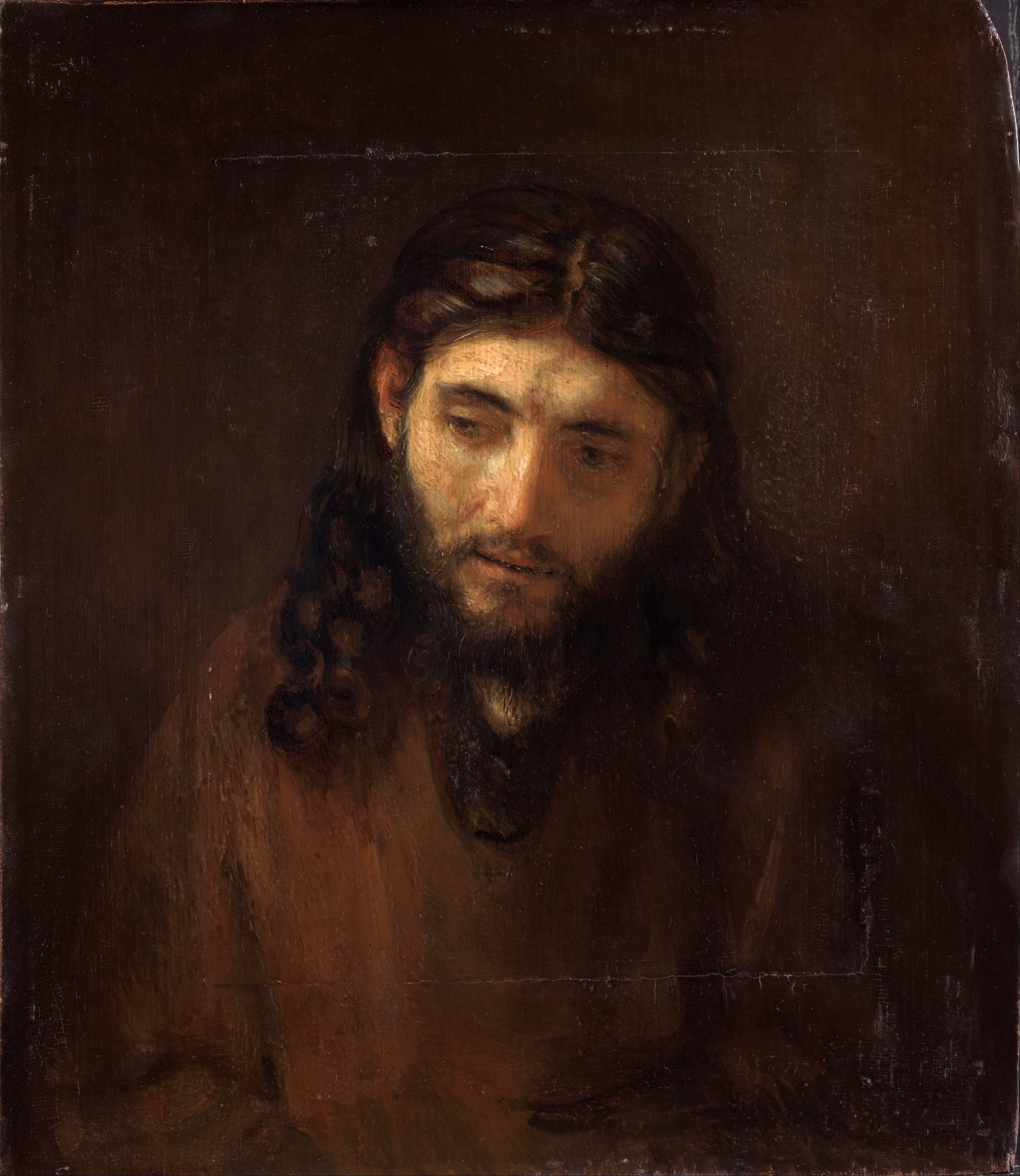
PMA

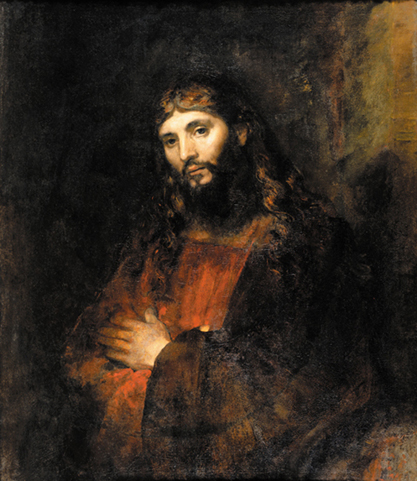
Hyde collection

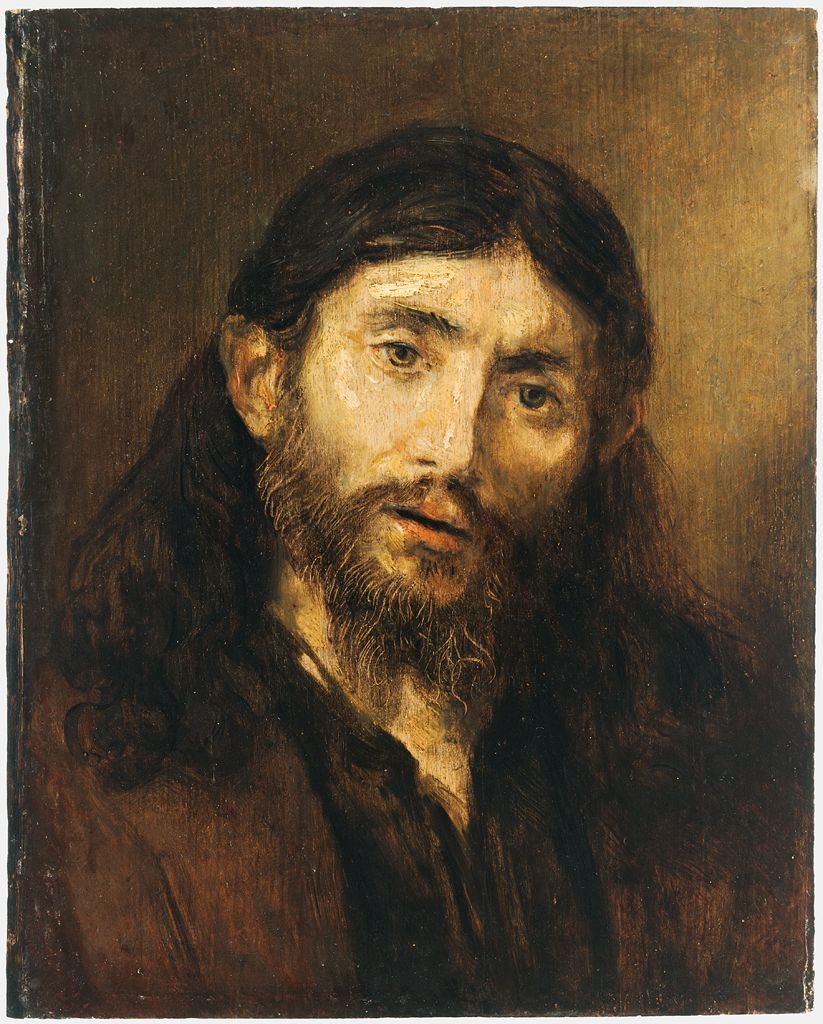
Fogg

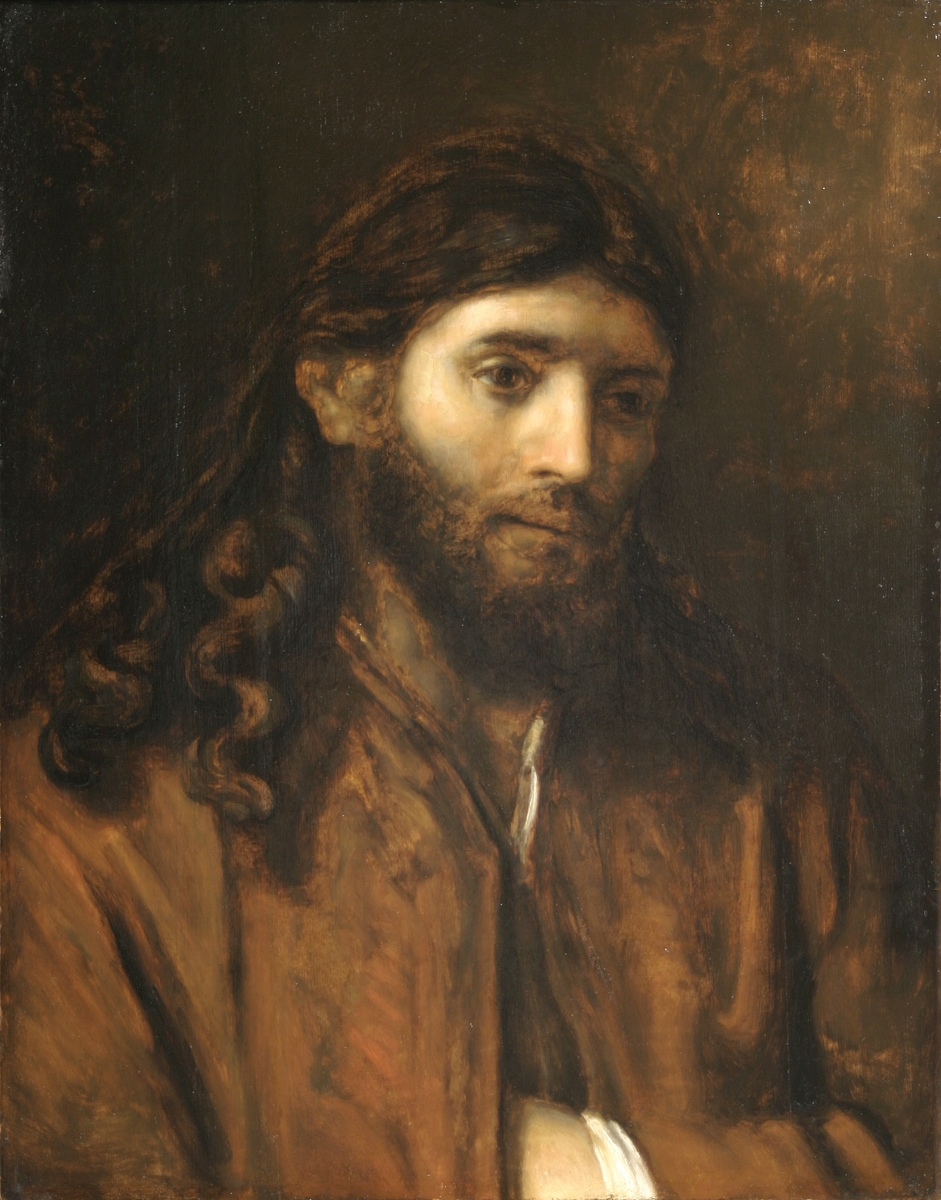
Brigham Young University

== See also ==
- List of paintings by Rembrandt

== Bibliography ==
- Christian Tümpel: Rembrandt. Rowohlt Taschenbuch Verlag, Reinbek 2006, ISBN 3-499-50691-2.
- Kristin Bahre u. a. (ed.): Rembrandt. Genie auf der Suche. DuMont Literatur und Kunst, Köln 2006, ISBN 3-8321-7694-2
- Rembrandt et la figure du Christ/Rembrandt and the face of Jesus, Musée du Louvre, Paris, 21 April 2011 – 18 July 2011, Philadelphia Museum of Art, Philadelphia, 3 August 2011 – 30 October 2011, Detroit Institute of Arts, Detroit, 20 November 2011 – 12 February 2012, ISBN 978-88-89854-71-6, cat.no. 35.
