= Head of Christ (Rembrandt, Abu Dhabi) =

Painting by Rembrandt van Rijn

- Head of Christ (Rembrandt, Abu Dhabi)
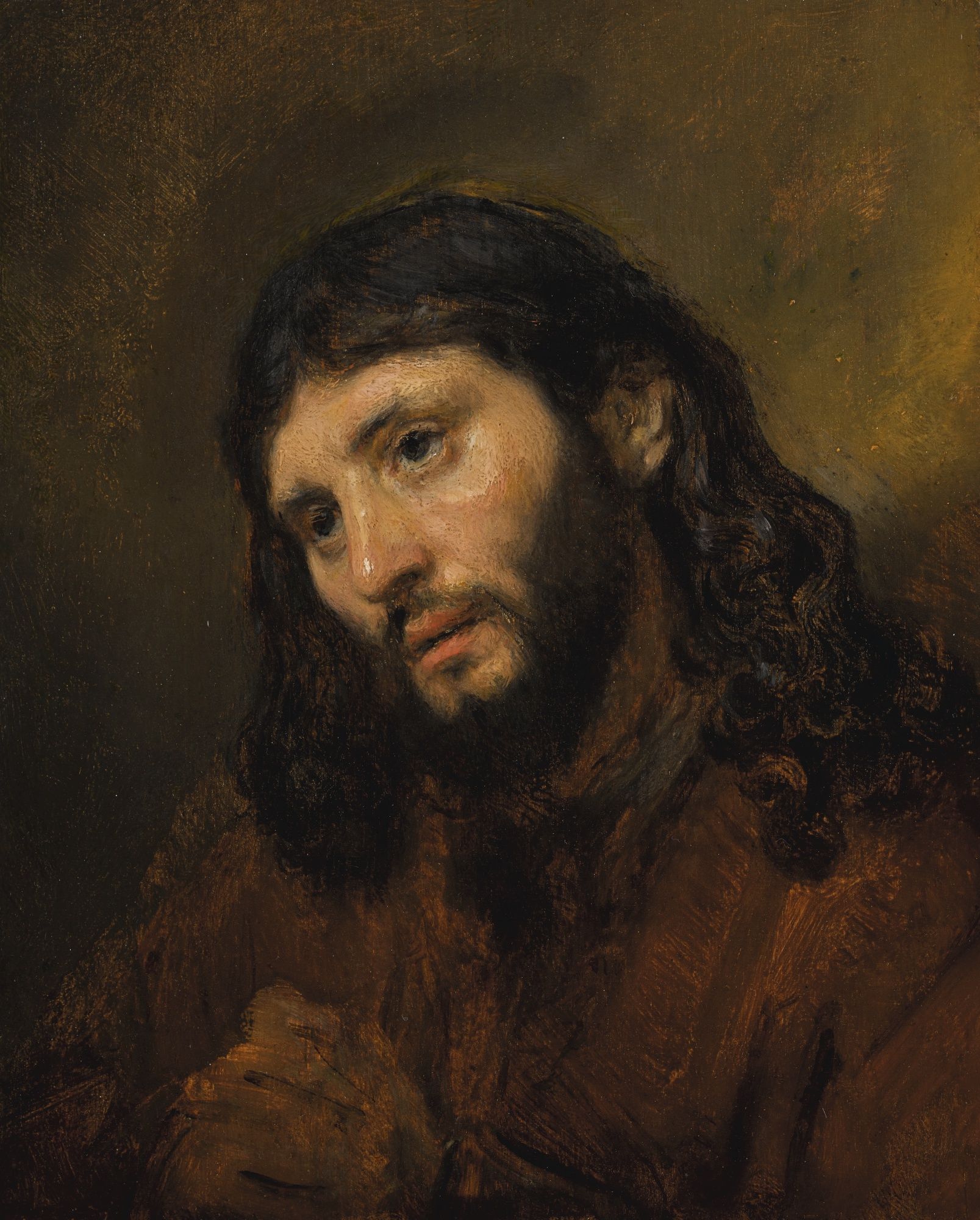
- Year: c. 1648
- Medium: oil paint, panel
- Dimensions: 25.5 cm (10.0 in) × 20.1 cm (7.9 in)
- Location: Louvre Abu Dhabi
- Collection: Louvre Abu Dhabi, Kunsthandel P. de Boer
- Identifiers: RKDimages ID: 268742

Head of Christ is a circa 1648 painting by Rembrandt or his workshop. It shows Christ with a beard and long dark hair. It is in the collection of the Louvre Abu Dhabi.

== Description ==
Rembrandt created several similar heads of the same model in varying poses, possibly as devotional objects. Today about a dozen are known. This one remained in private hands until 2019, when it came into the collection via purchase at Sotheby's in London for a hammer price of 9,480,800 GBP. This face of Christ relates very closely to the version at the Gemäldegalerie, long considered the primary version. Rembrandt expert Ernst van de Wetering calls this one autograph or by a Rembrandt pupil.

This painting was overlooked by Wilhelm Valentiner in his 1908 catalog, as he explored the idea of a series of rotations of the heads of the same model. In this series he chose the similarly posed head of the Hyde Collection version substituted for this one in his row of five (he chose Philadelphia, then Berlin, Detroit, Hyde, and finally, New York). He worked in New York, so he was most familiar with the Hyde and New York versions.

Valentiner lineup:

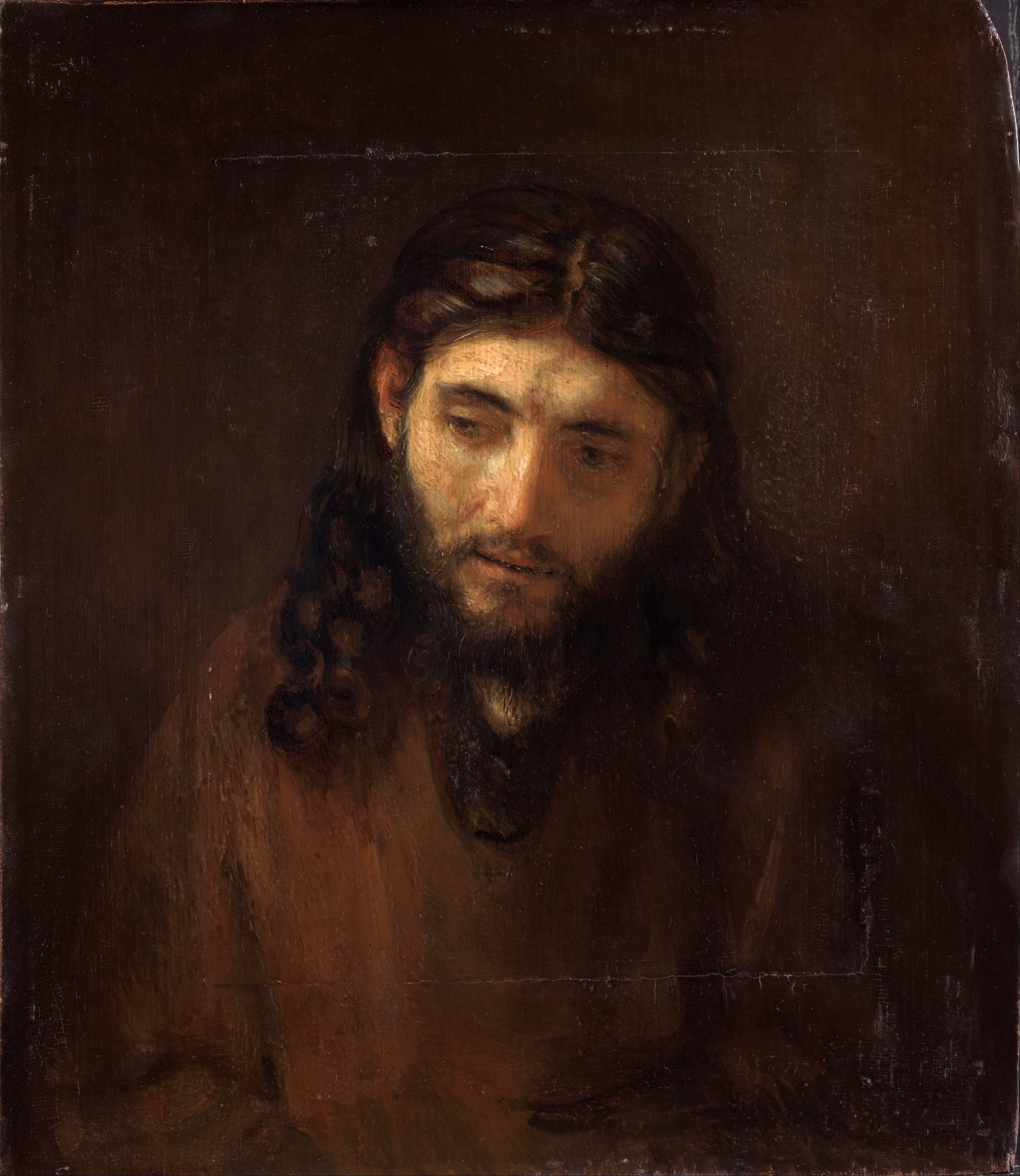
Philadelphia

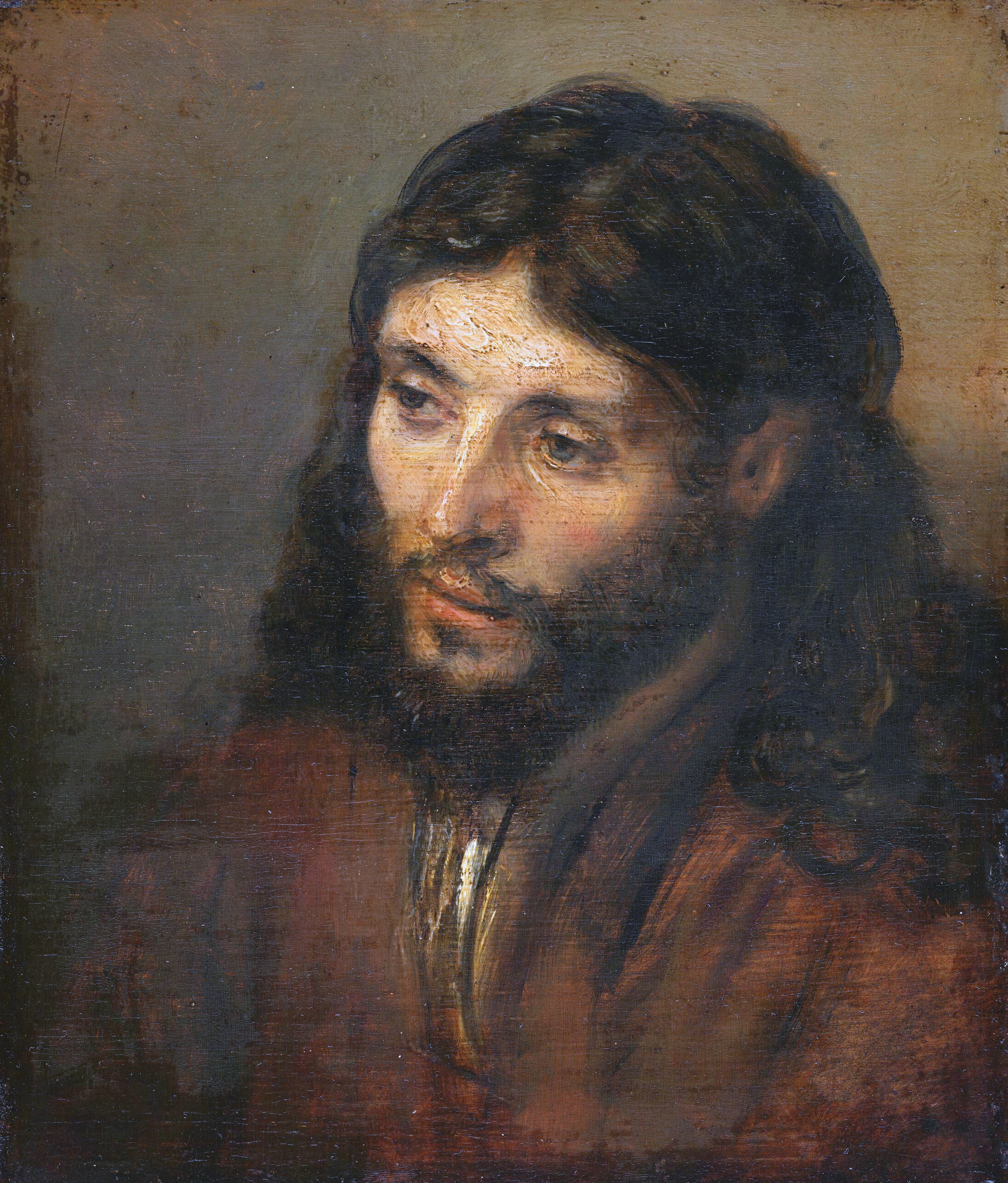
Berlin

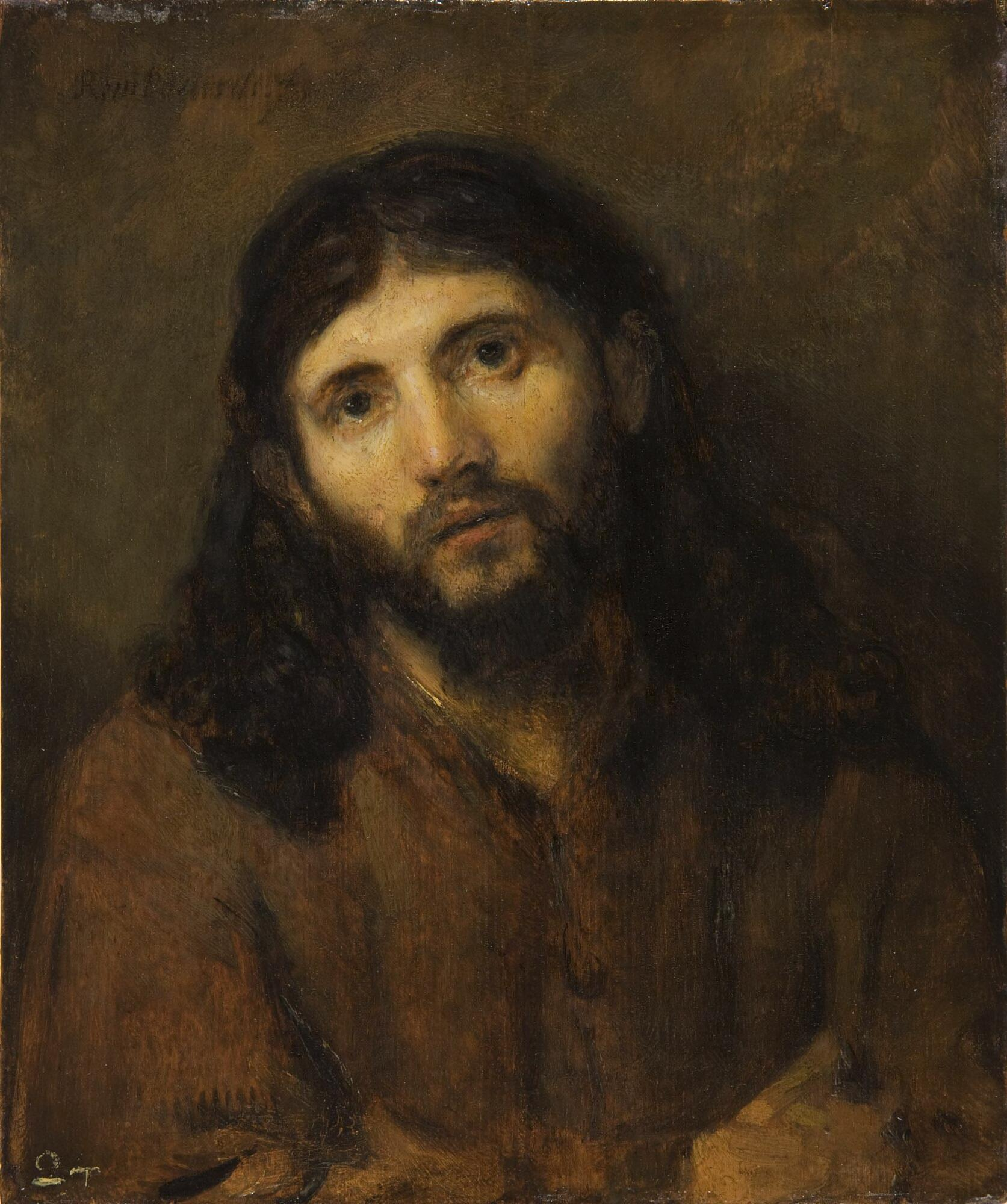
DIA

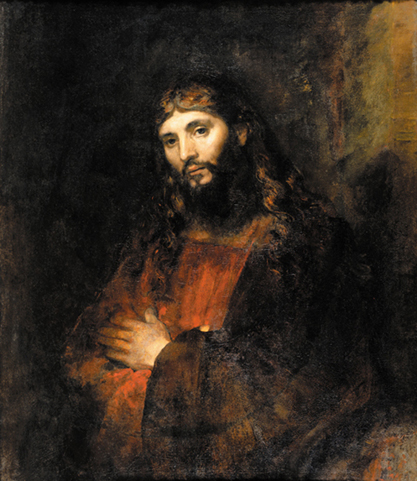
Hyde Collection

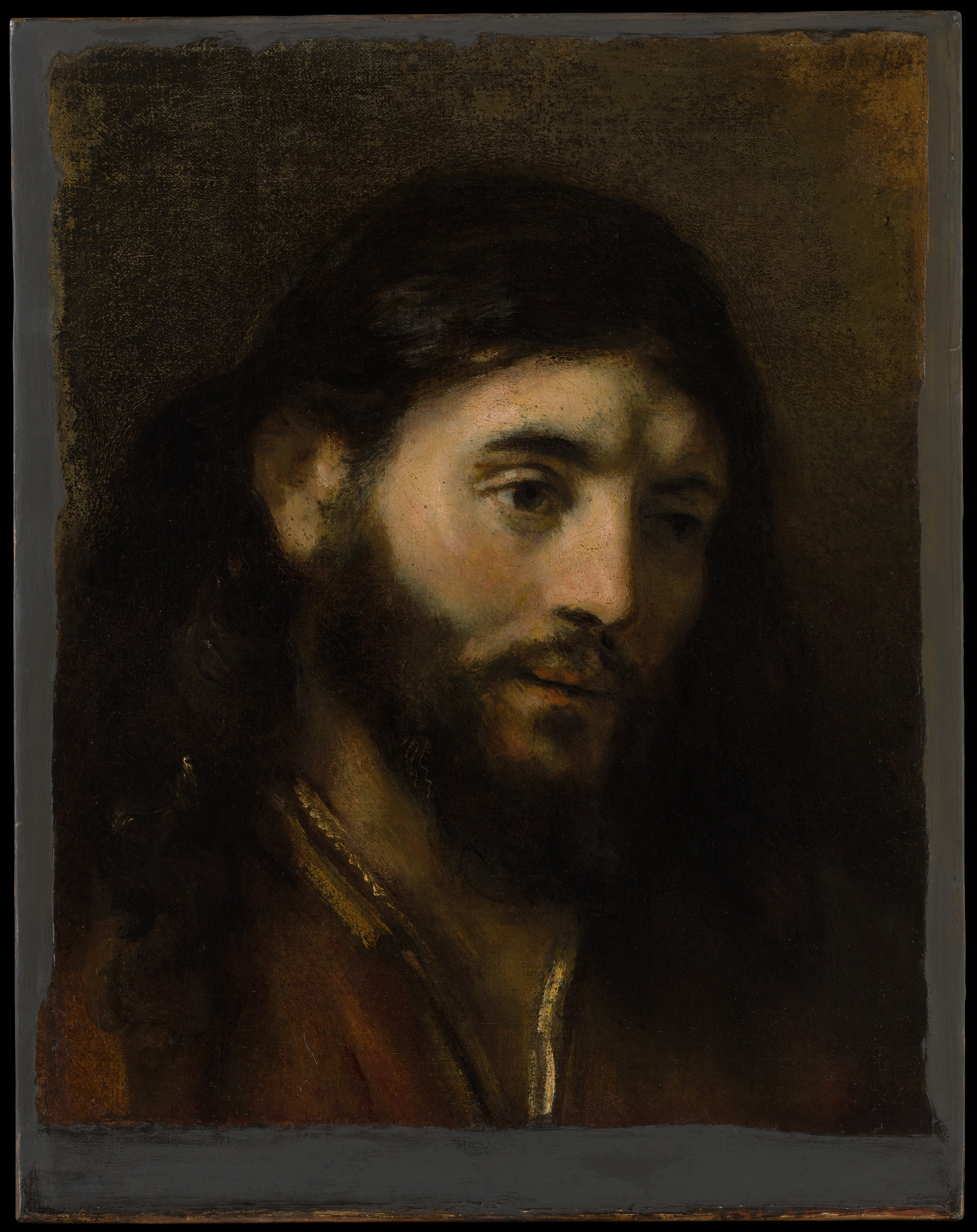
New York

It was included by Abraham Bredius in 1935, who included it in his 1935 catalog as one of nine heads of Christ, with his own version as the prime version.

Bredius lineup:

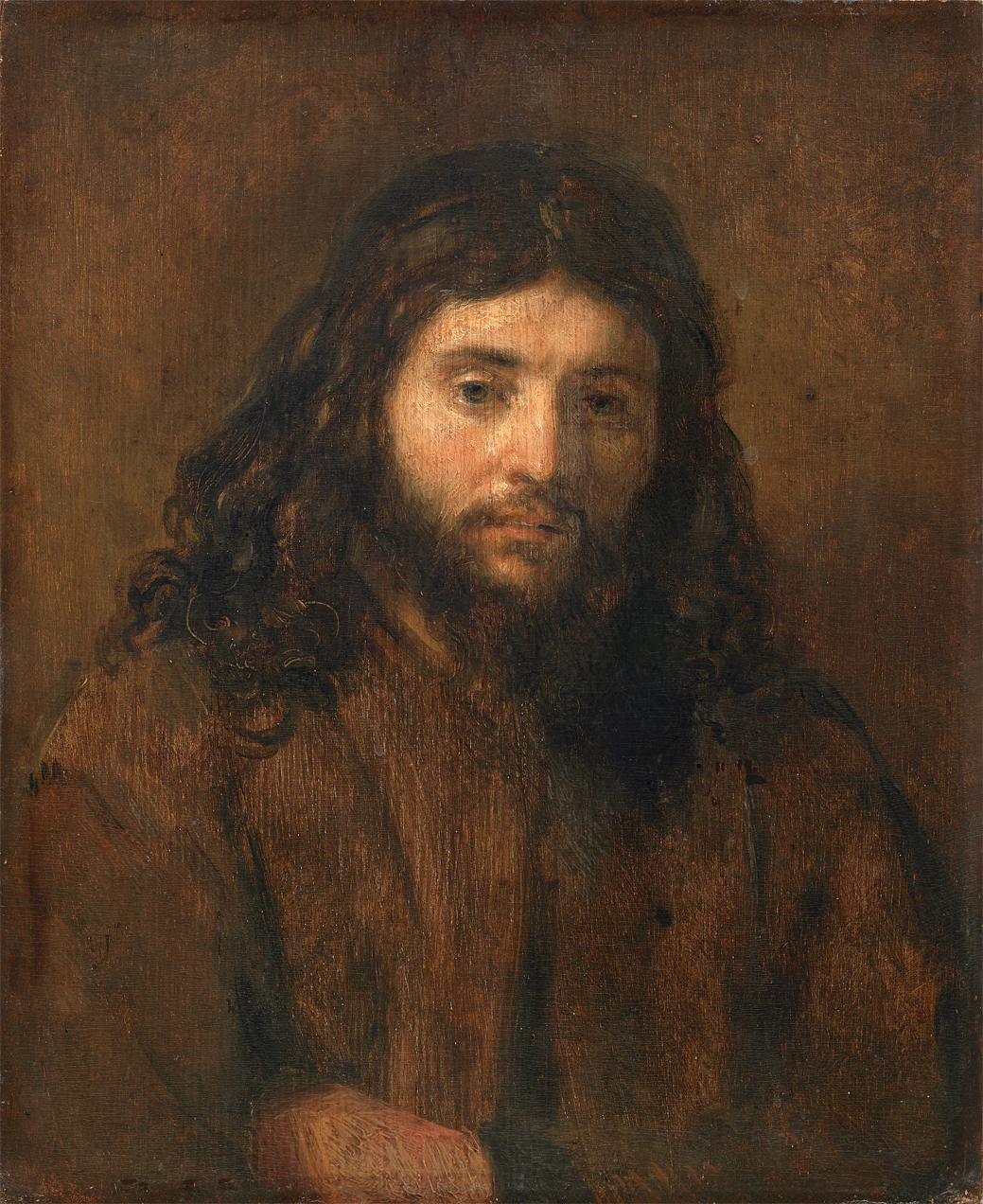
Bredius version

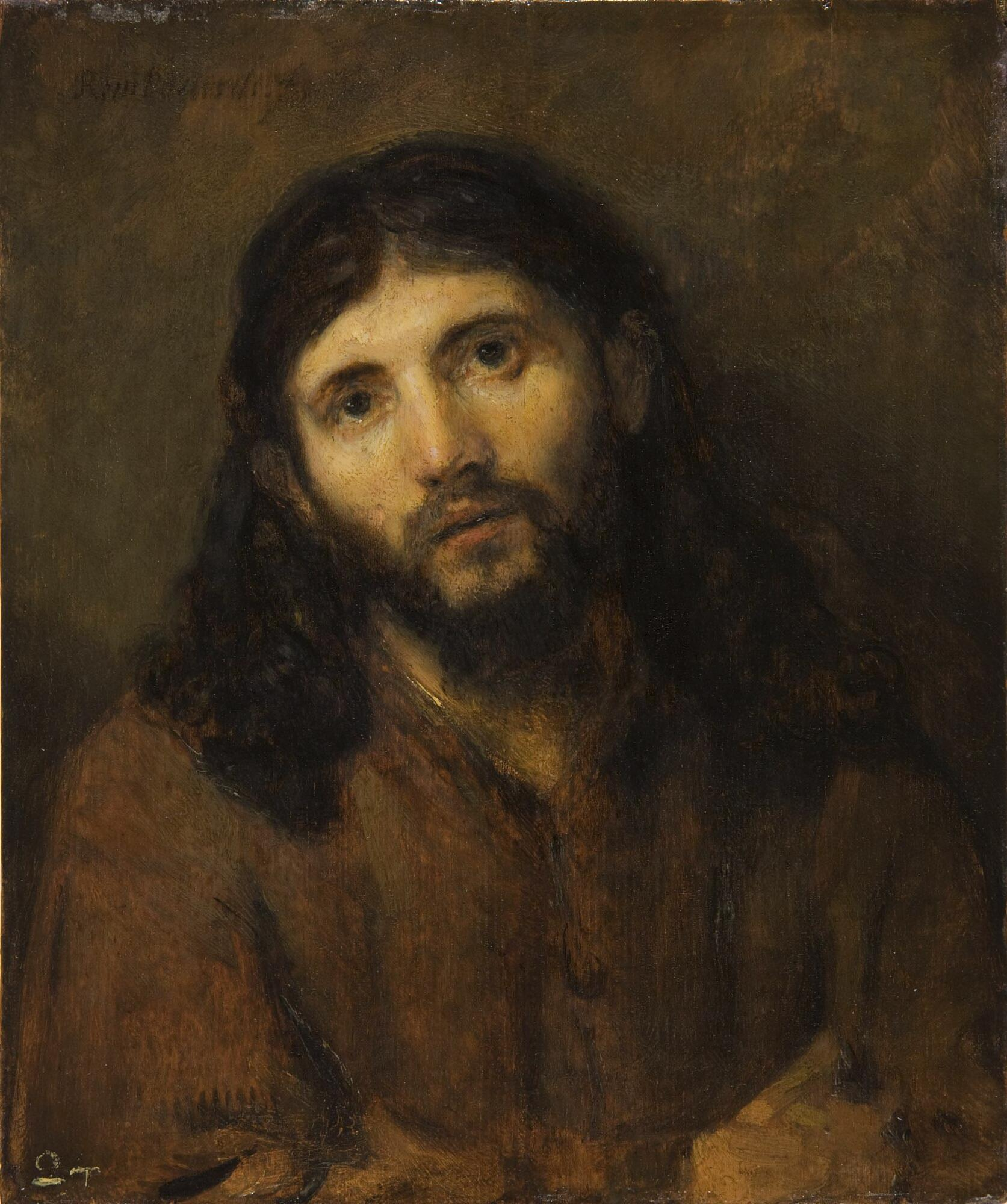
DIA

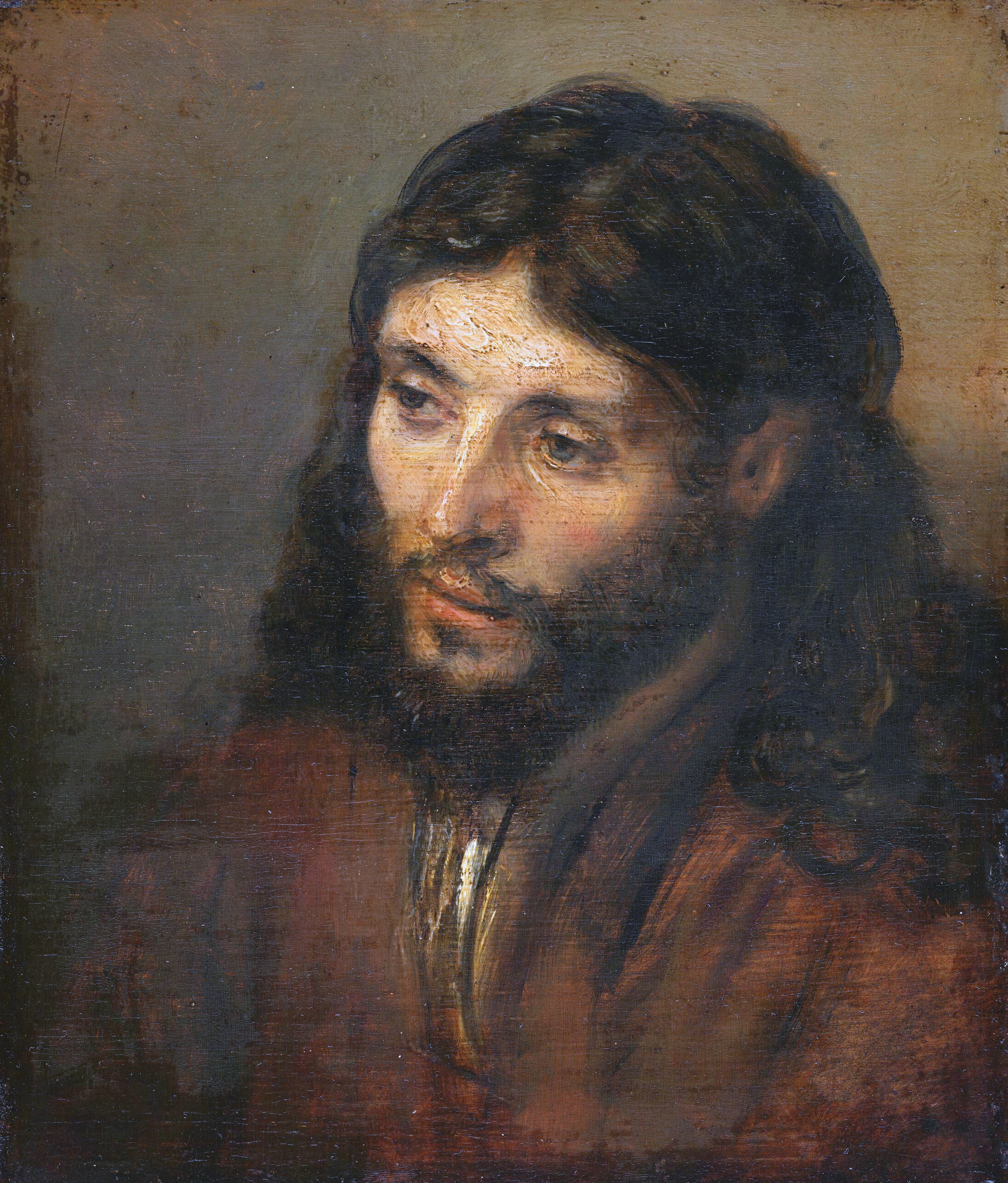
Berlin

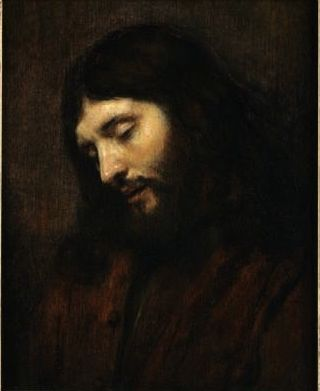
Amsterdam Bible Museum version

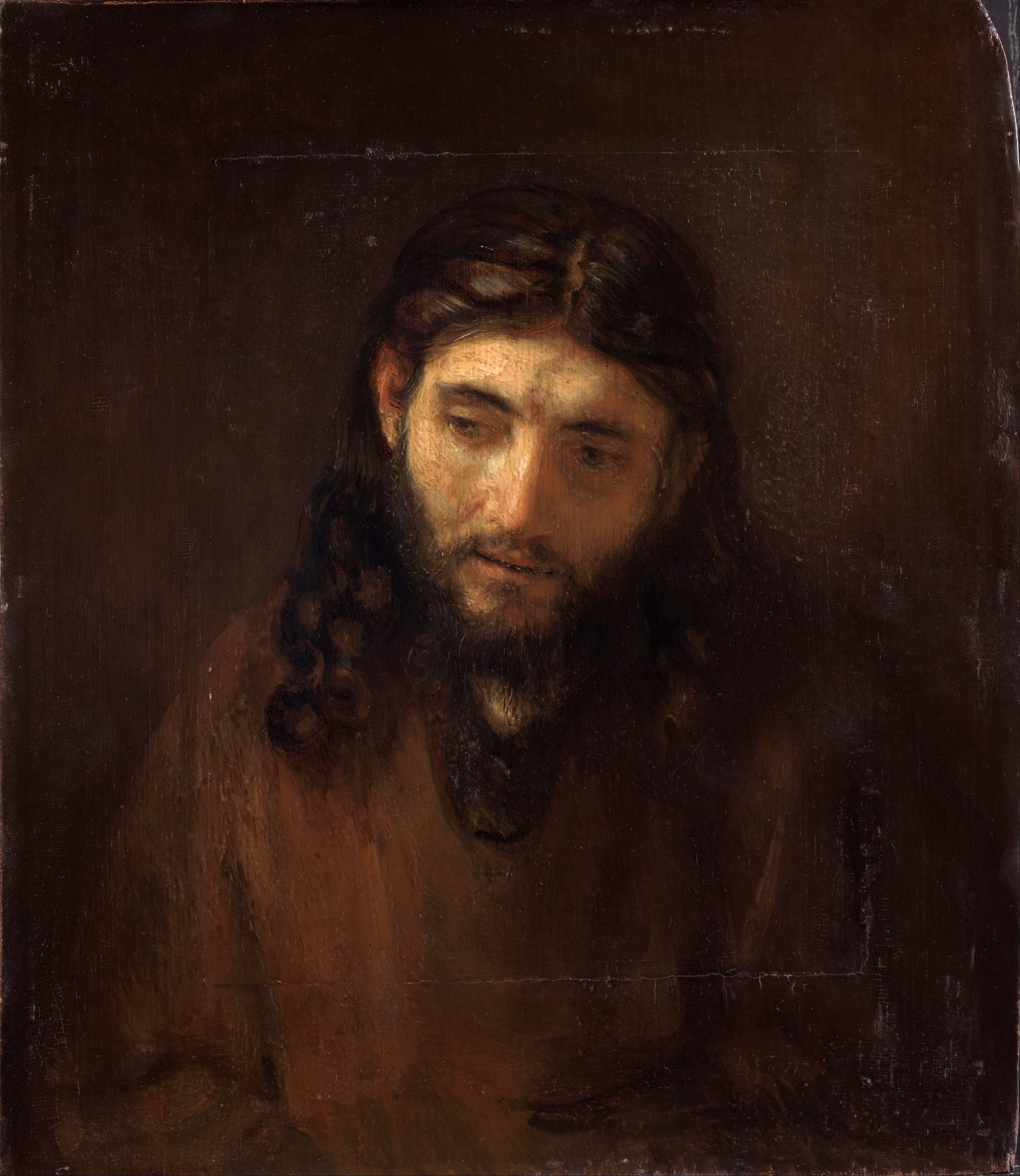
Philadelphia

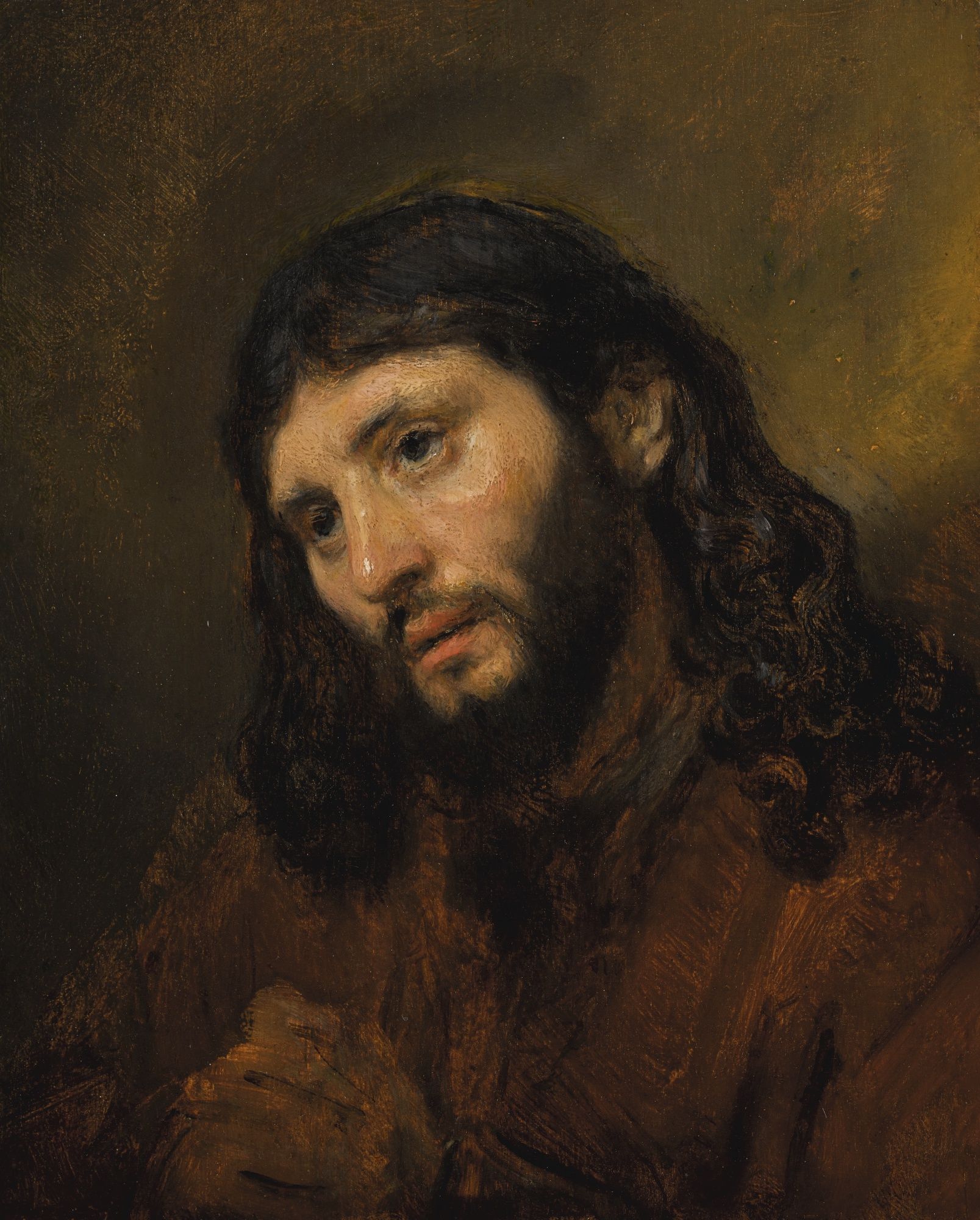
This one

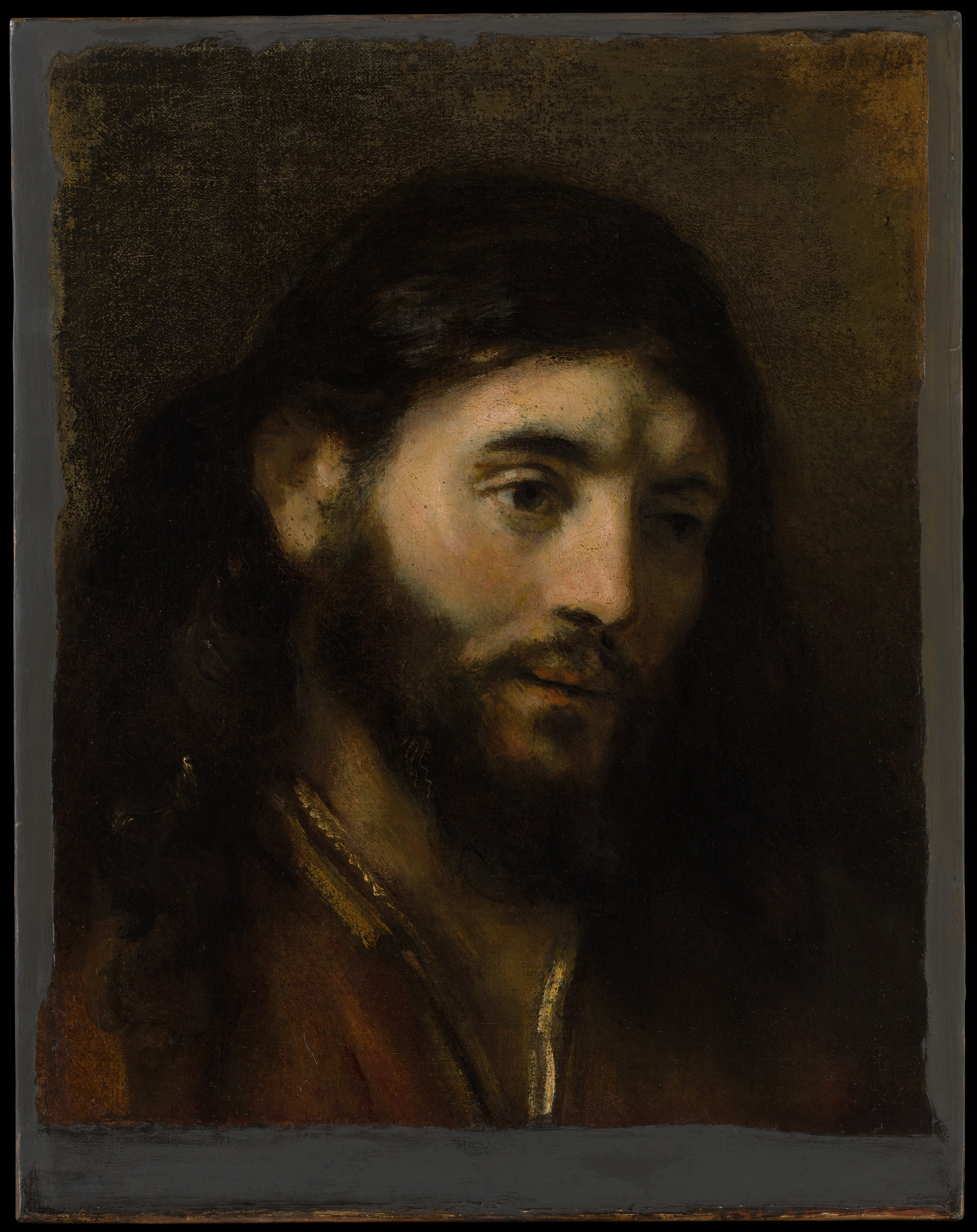
New York

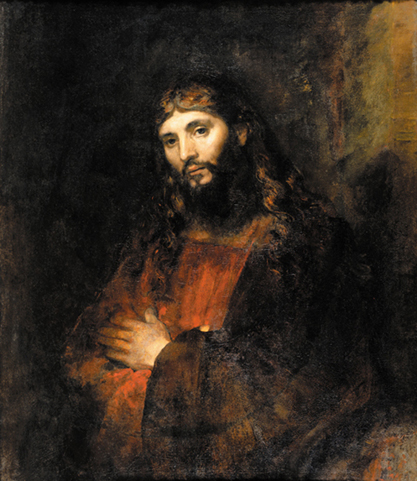
Hyde Collection

In his response to the Bredius catalog, it was included by Horst Gerson in 1968, who included it as one of only four heads of Christ by the master, the others being the Bredius version, the Detroit version and the New York version.

Gerson lineup:

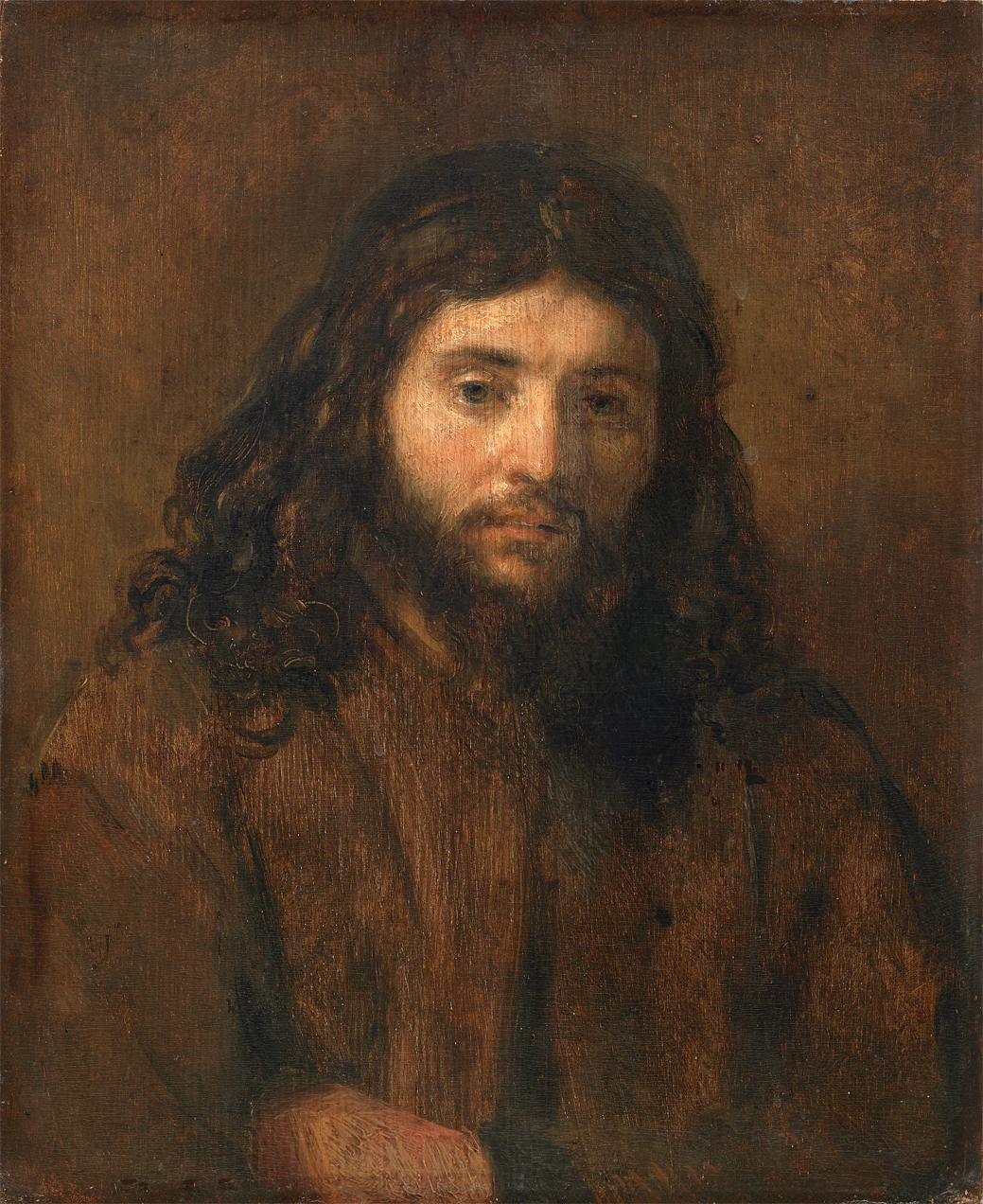
Bredius version

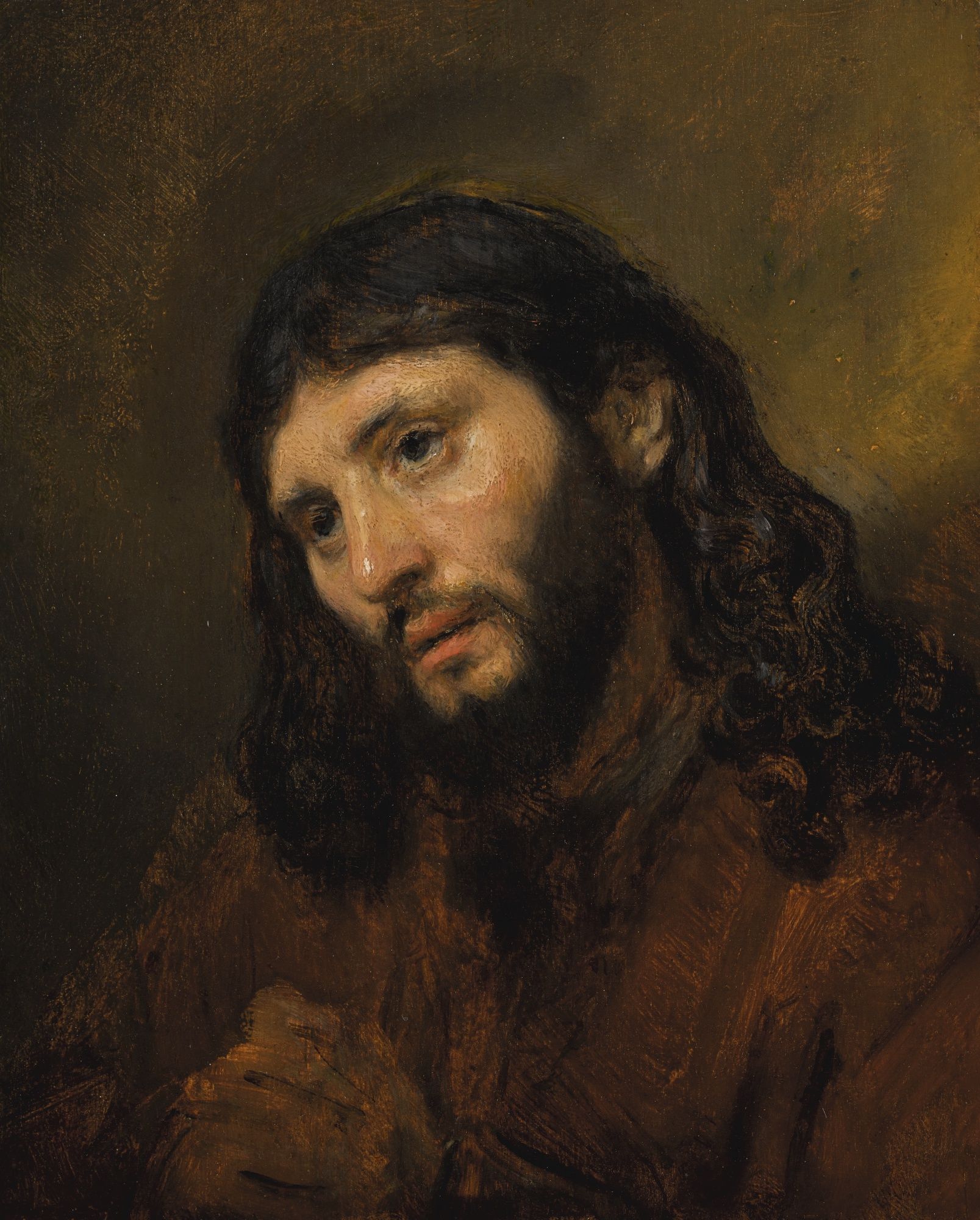
This one

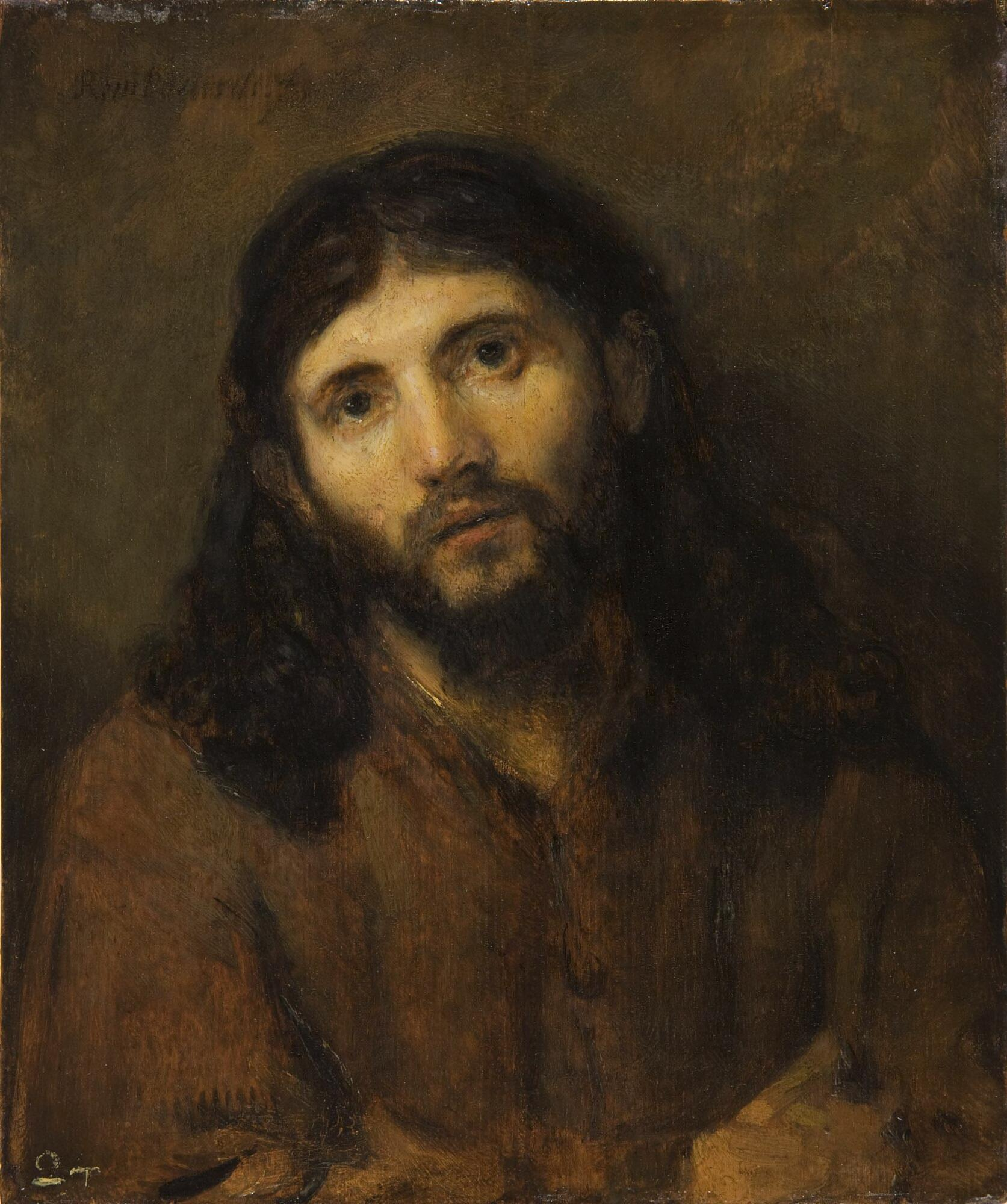
DIA

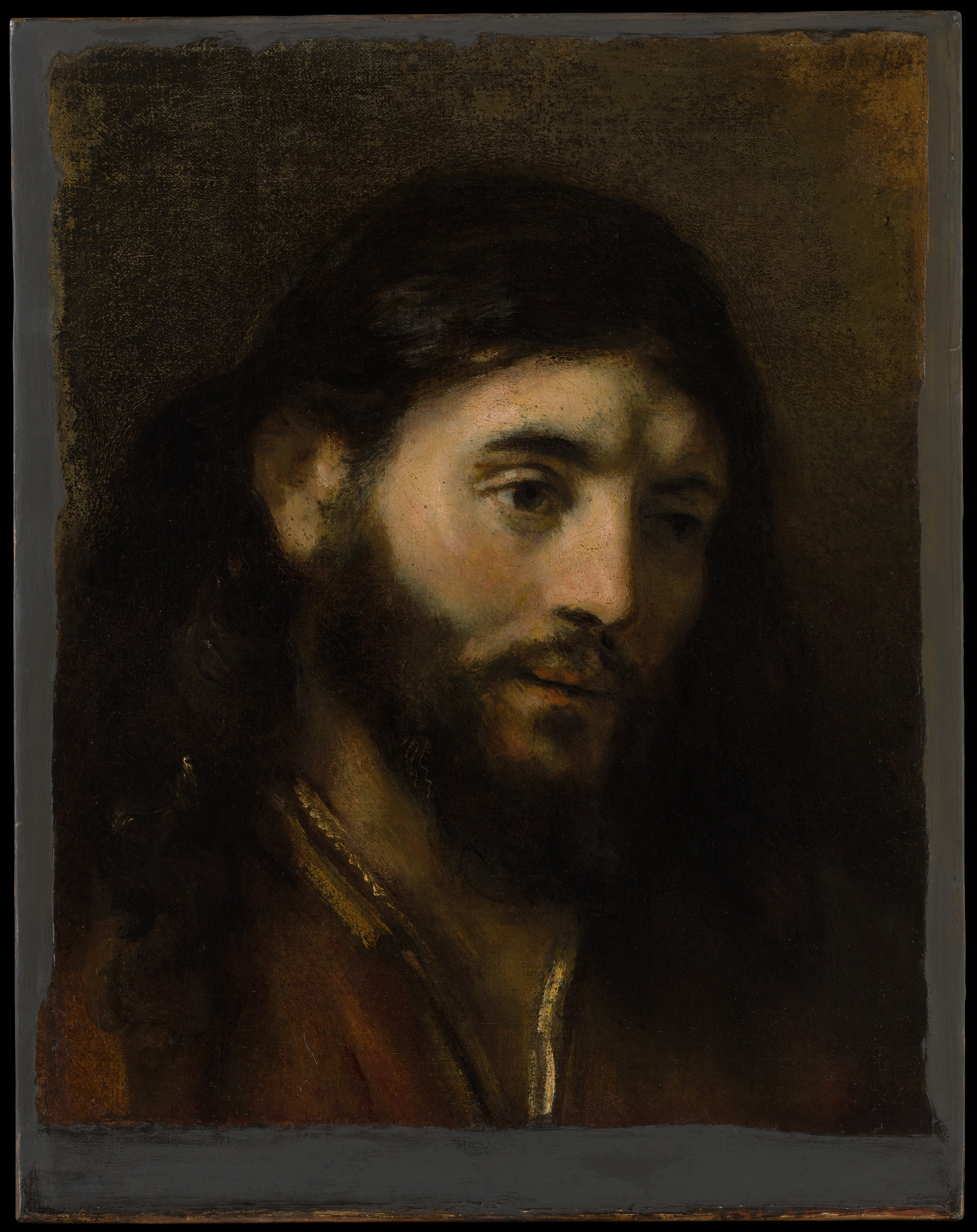
New York

The painting was included in the 2011 exhibition "Rembrandt and the Face of Jesus" held in the museums of Detroit (DIA), Philadelphia (PMA) and Paris (Louvre) April 21, 2011 – February 12, 2012, no. 41.

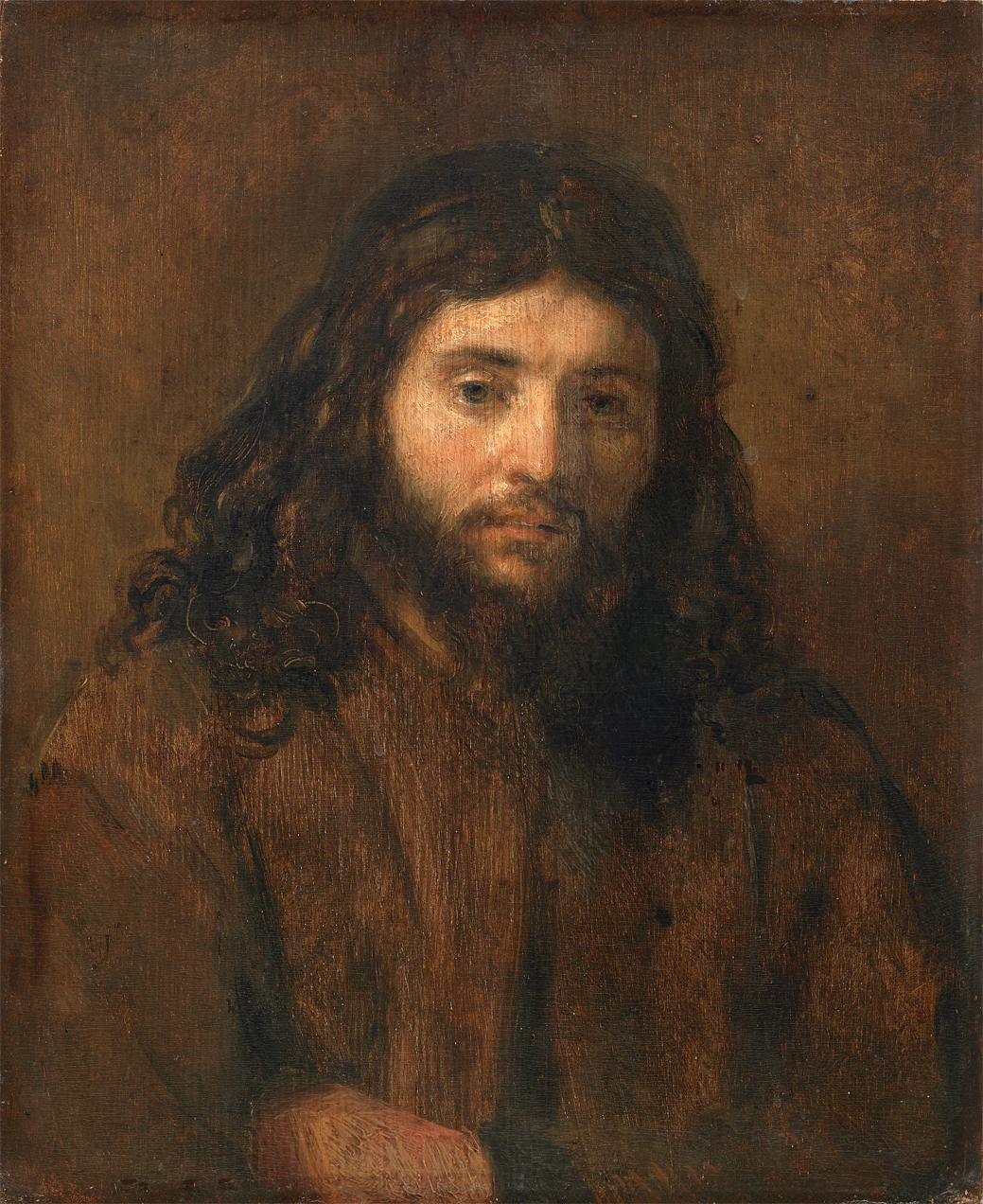
Bredius

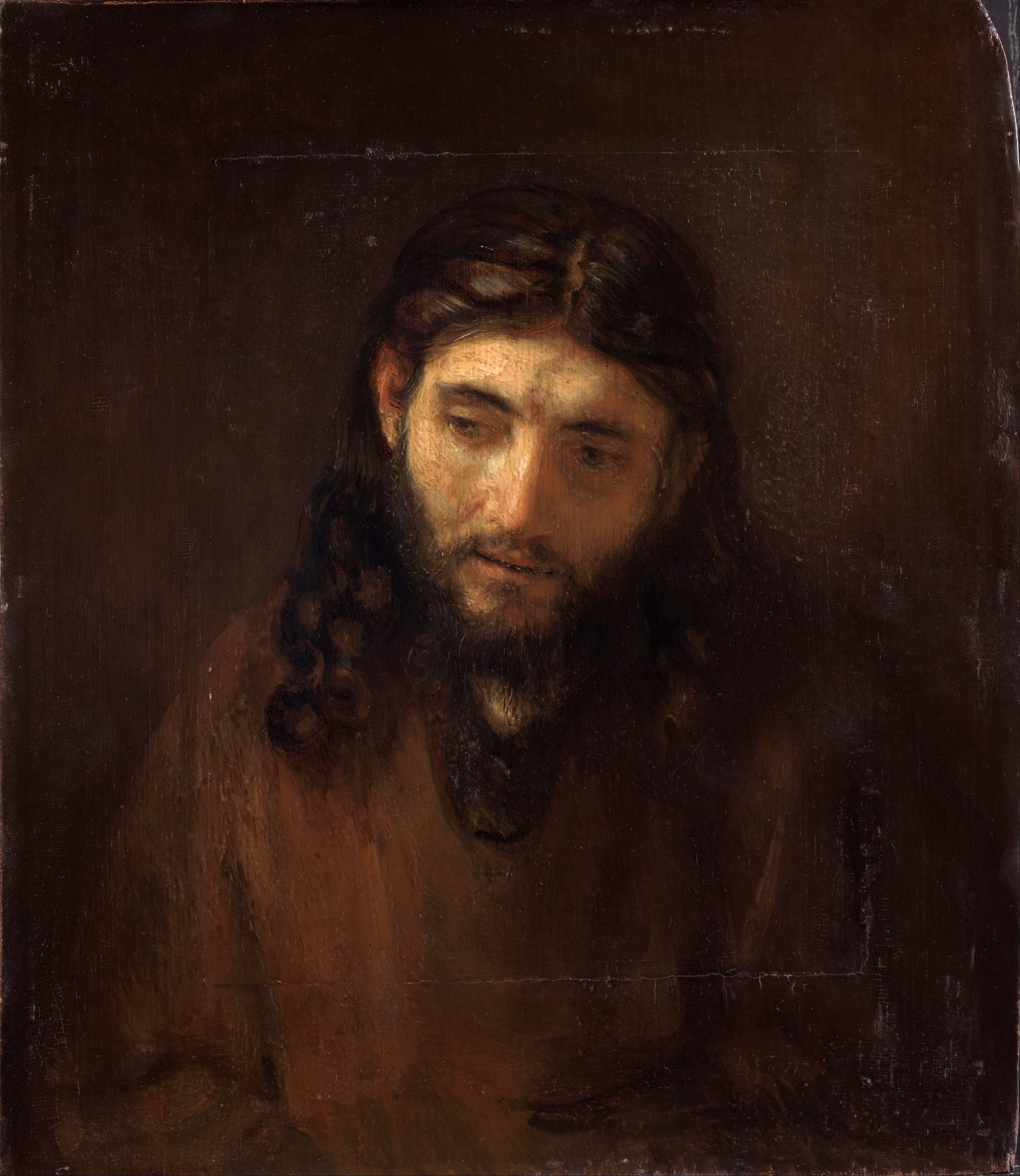
Philadelphia

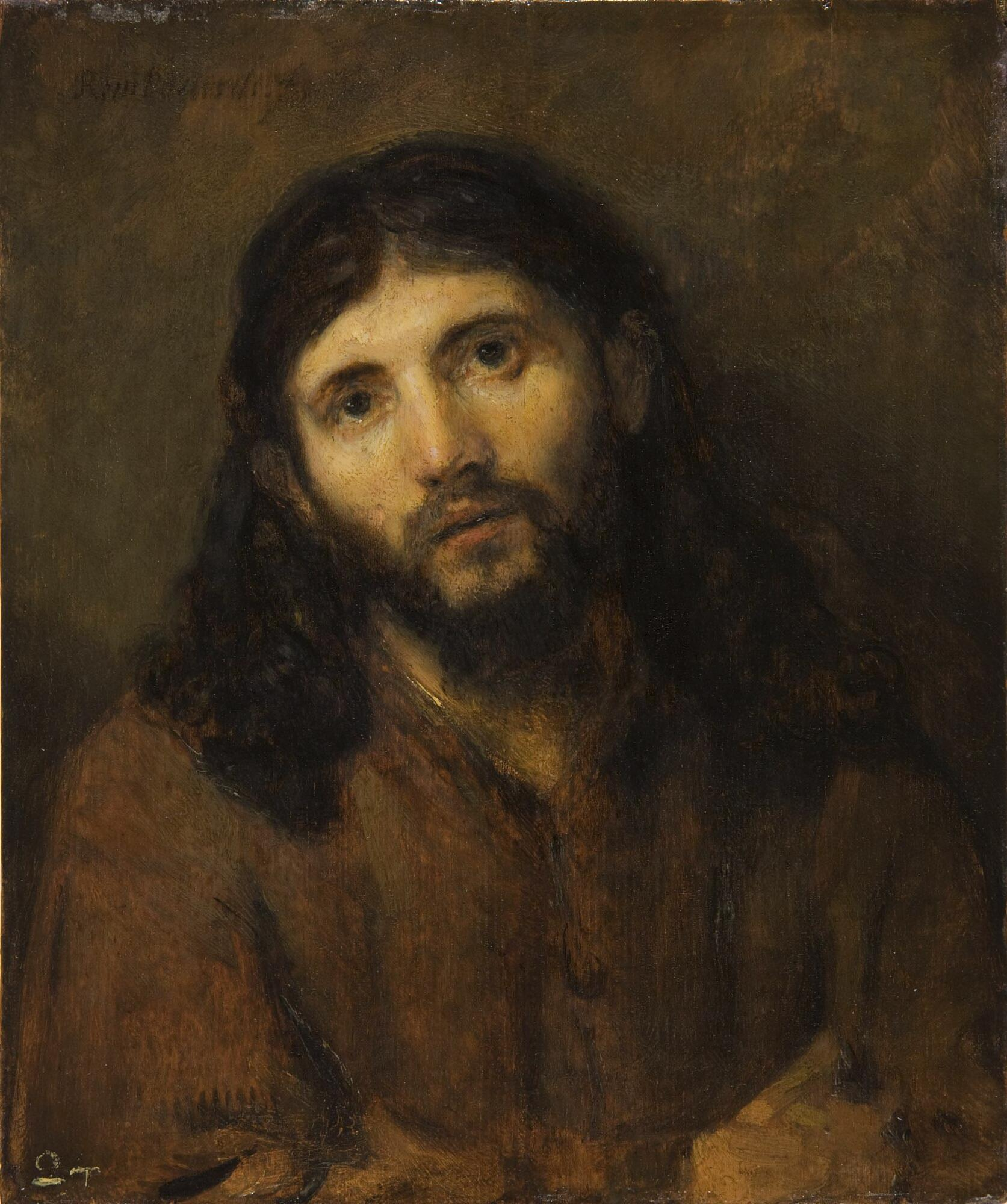
DIA

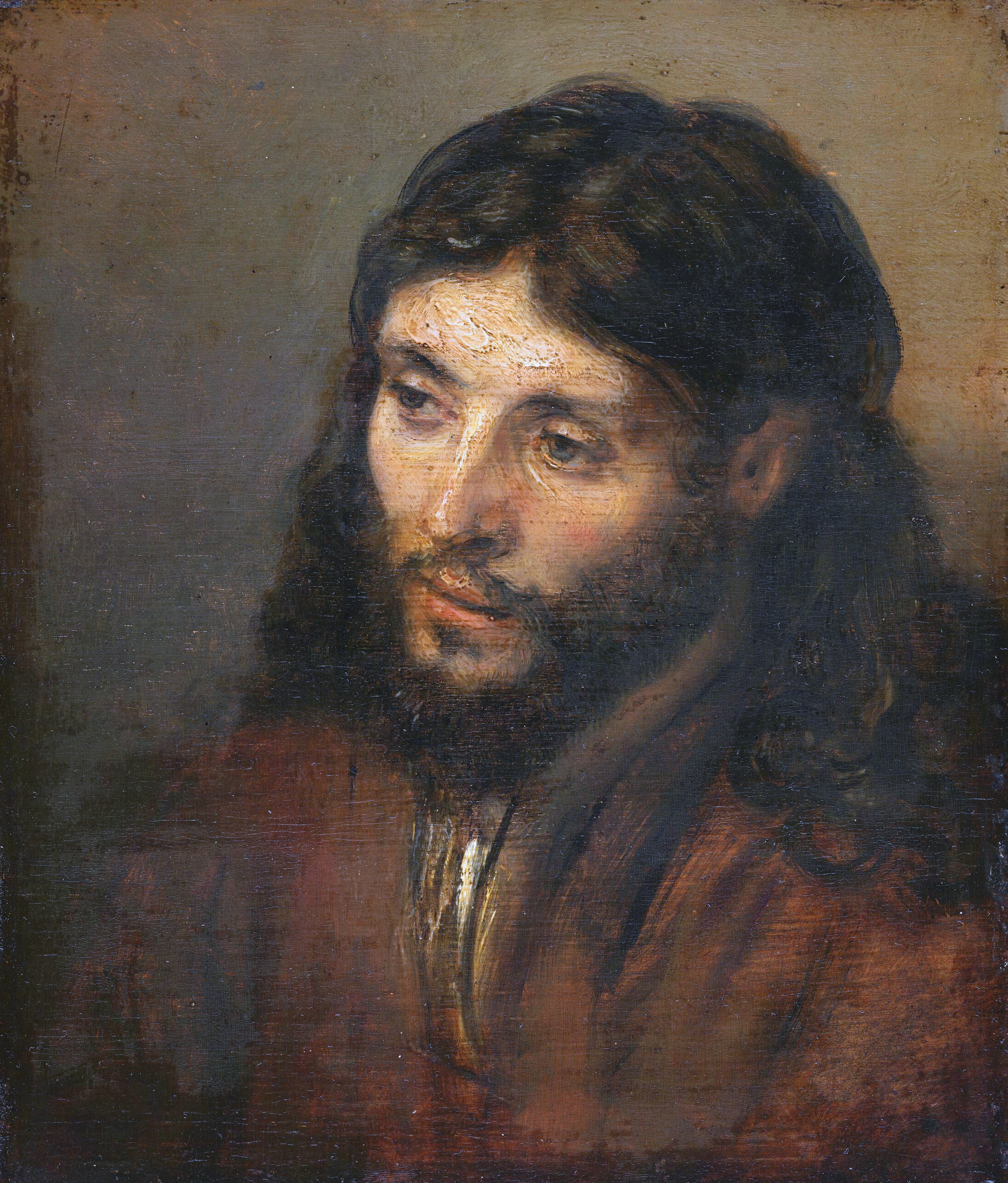
Berlin

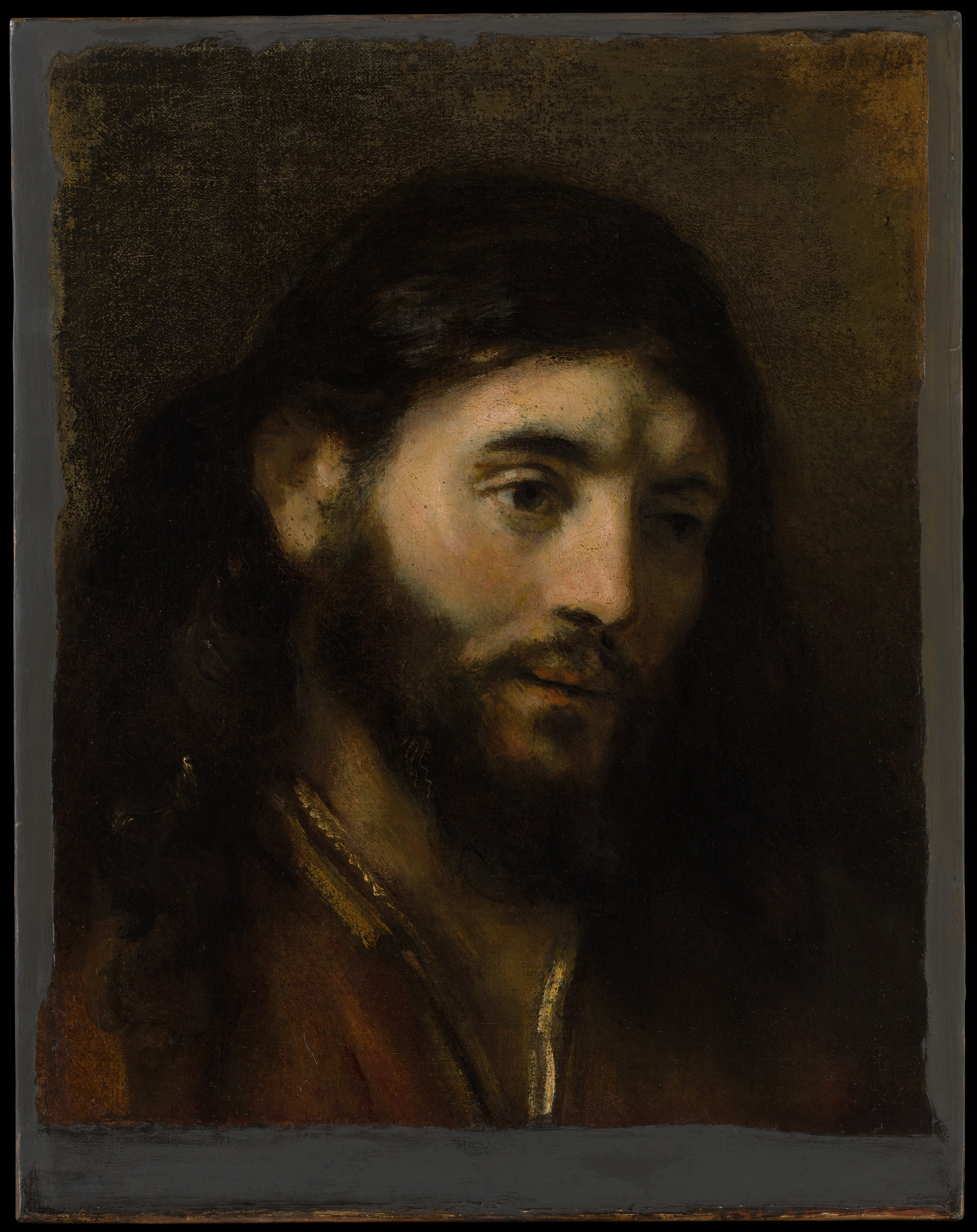
New York

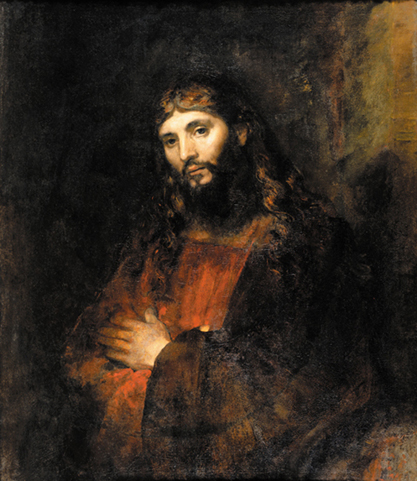
Hyde collection

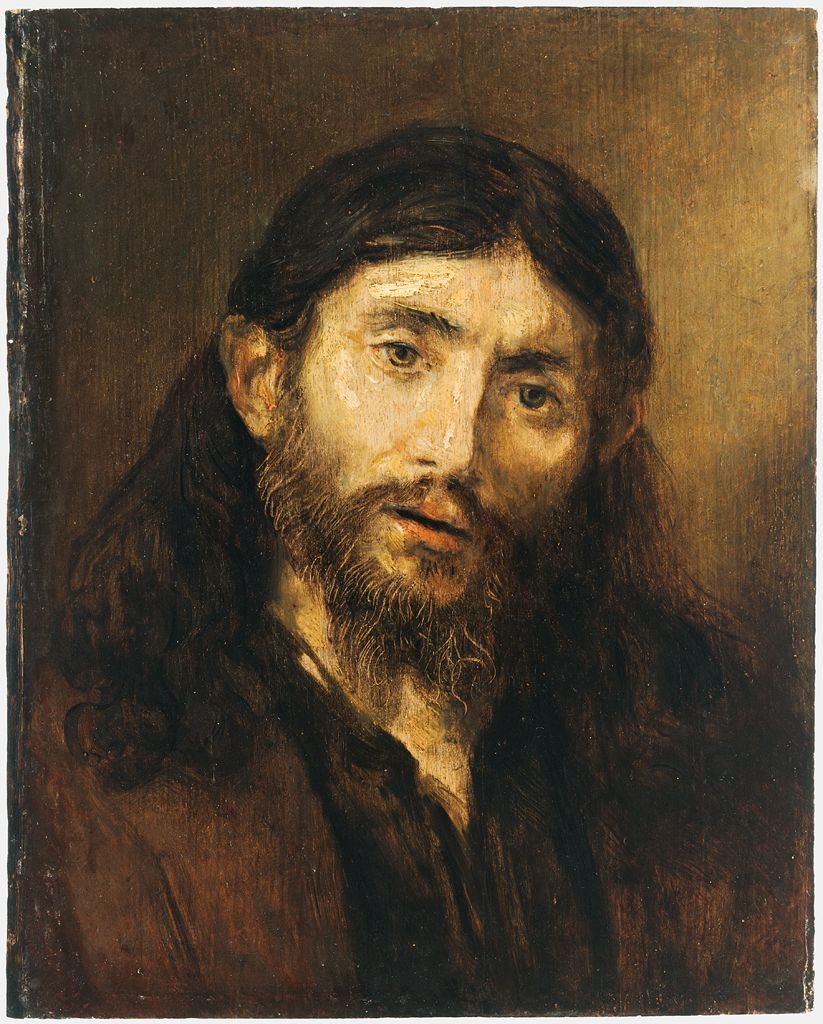
Fogg

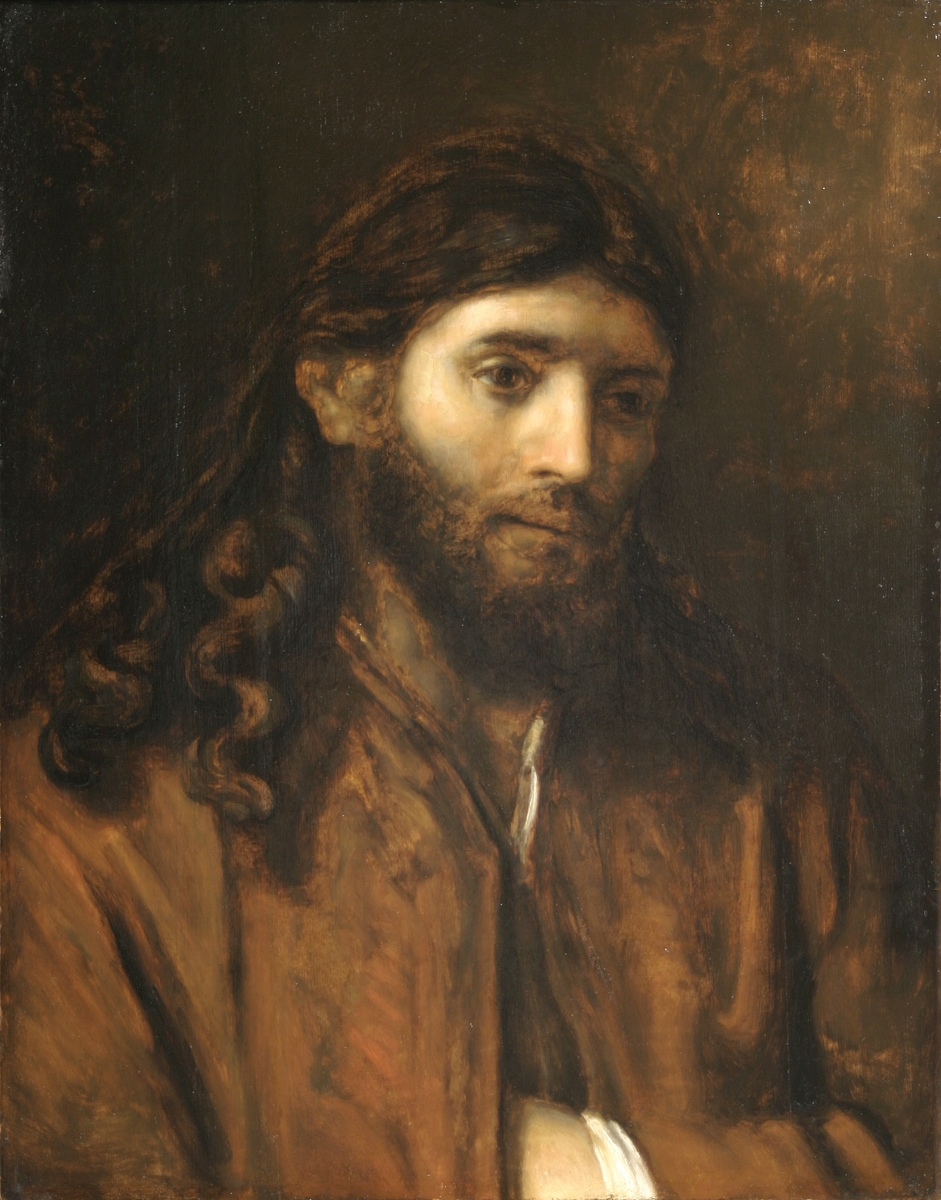
Brigham Young University
