= Head of Christ (Rembrandt, New York) =

Painting by Rembrandt's workshop

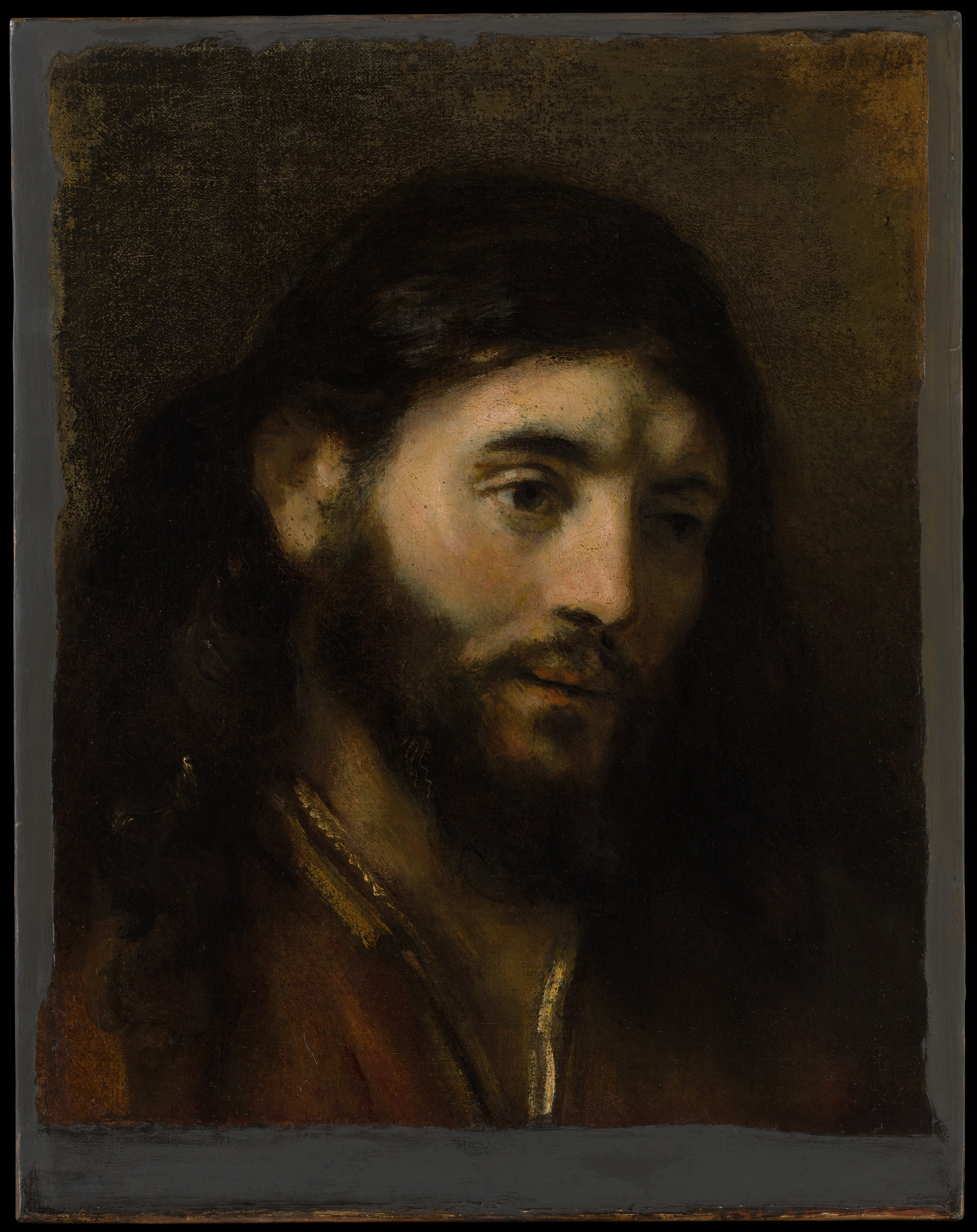
- Year: 1650s
- Medium: oil paint, canvas
- Dimensions: 47.3 cm (18.6 in) × 37.1 cm (14.6 in)
- Location: Metropolitan Museum of Art
- Accession no.: 17.120.222
- Identifiers: RKDimages ID: 233255; The Met object ID: 437404

Head of Christ is a 1650s painting by Rembrandt's workshop. It shows Christ with a beard and long dark hair. It is in the collection of the Metropolitan Museum of Art.

== Description ==
Rembrandt created several similar heads in varying poses, possibly as devotional objects. Today about a dozen are known. This one came into the collection via the Isaac D. Fletcher bequest.

This painting was documented by Hofstede de Groot in 1914, who wrote; "160. HEAD OF CHRIST. Bode 295; Dut. 78; Wb. 301; B.-HdG. 414. Long dark curls, a short full beard, and dark eyes. Turned to the right. In a brownish-red coat, showing at top the hem of the shirt. Strong light falls from the left on the upper part of the right side of the face. Dark background. Life size. Painted about 1659. Canvas, 18 1/2 inches by 14 1/2 inches. Mentioned by Bode, pp. 522, 597; by Dutuit, p. 51; by Michel, p. 563 [435]. Exhibited at Amsterdam, 1898, No. 109; in Paris, 1911, No. 125. Sale. J. Wandelaar, Amsterdam, September 4, 1759, No. 13 (5 florins 10, J. Enschede). In the possession of the Paris dealer C. Sedelmeyer, "Catalogue of 300 Paintings," No. 149. In the collection of Maurice Kann, Paris. In the possession of the Paris dealer F. Kleinberger. In the collection of Isaac D. Fletcher, New York."

The painting was included in most Rembrandt catalogs of the 20th-century, only recently being rejected as autograph by the latest RRP catalog. It is, however, still connected with Rembrandt's workshop and is grouped together with all the other versions. It was included in the 2011 exhibition "Rembrandt and the Face of Jesus" held in the museums of Detroit (DIA), Philadelphia (PMA) and Paris (Louvre) April 21, 2011 – February 12, 2012, no. 46.

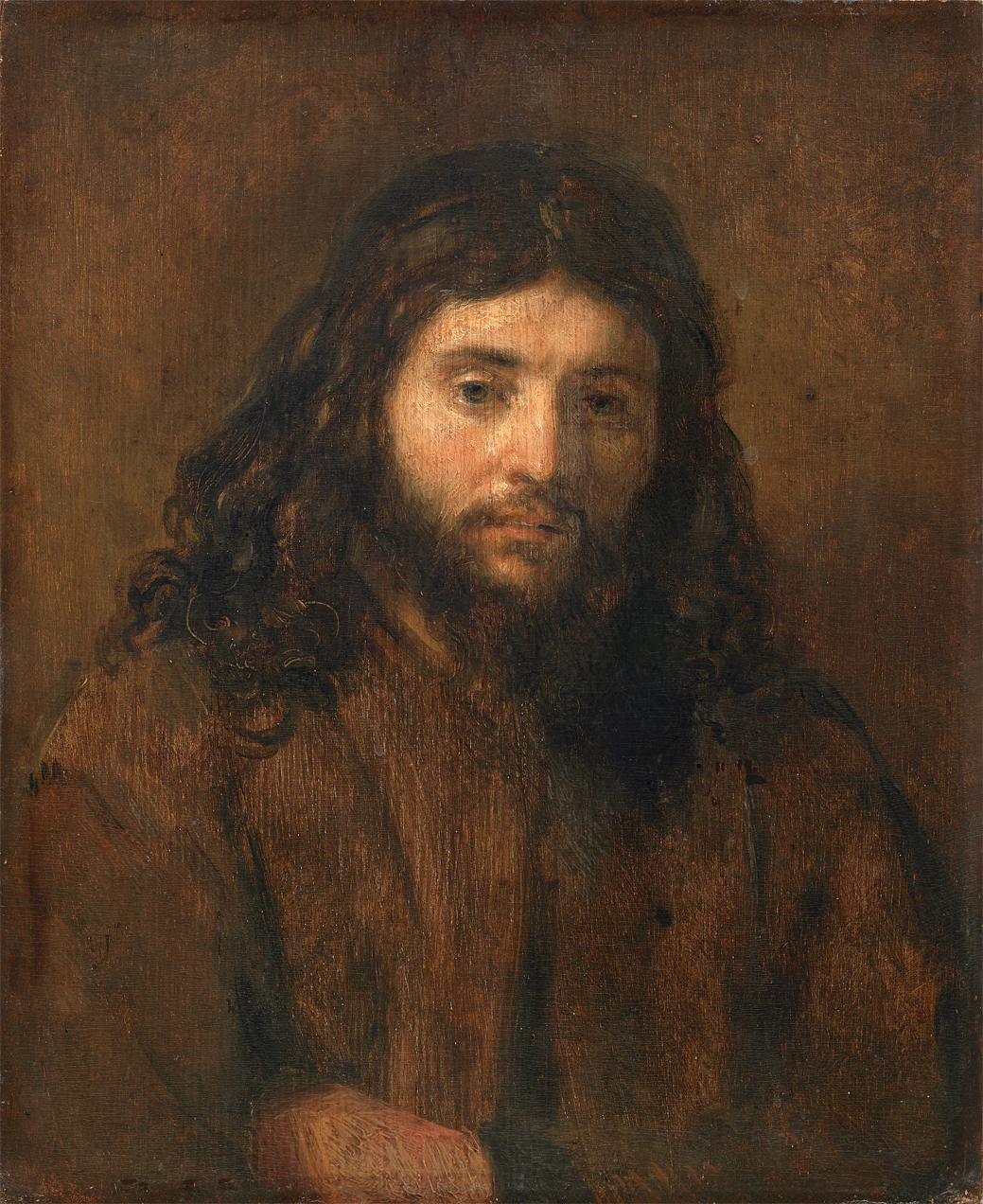
Bredius

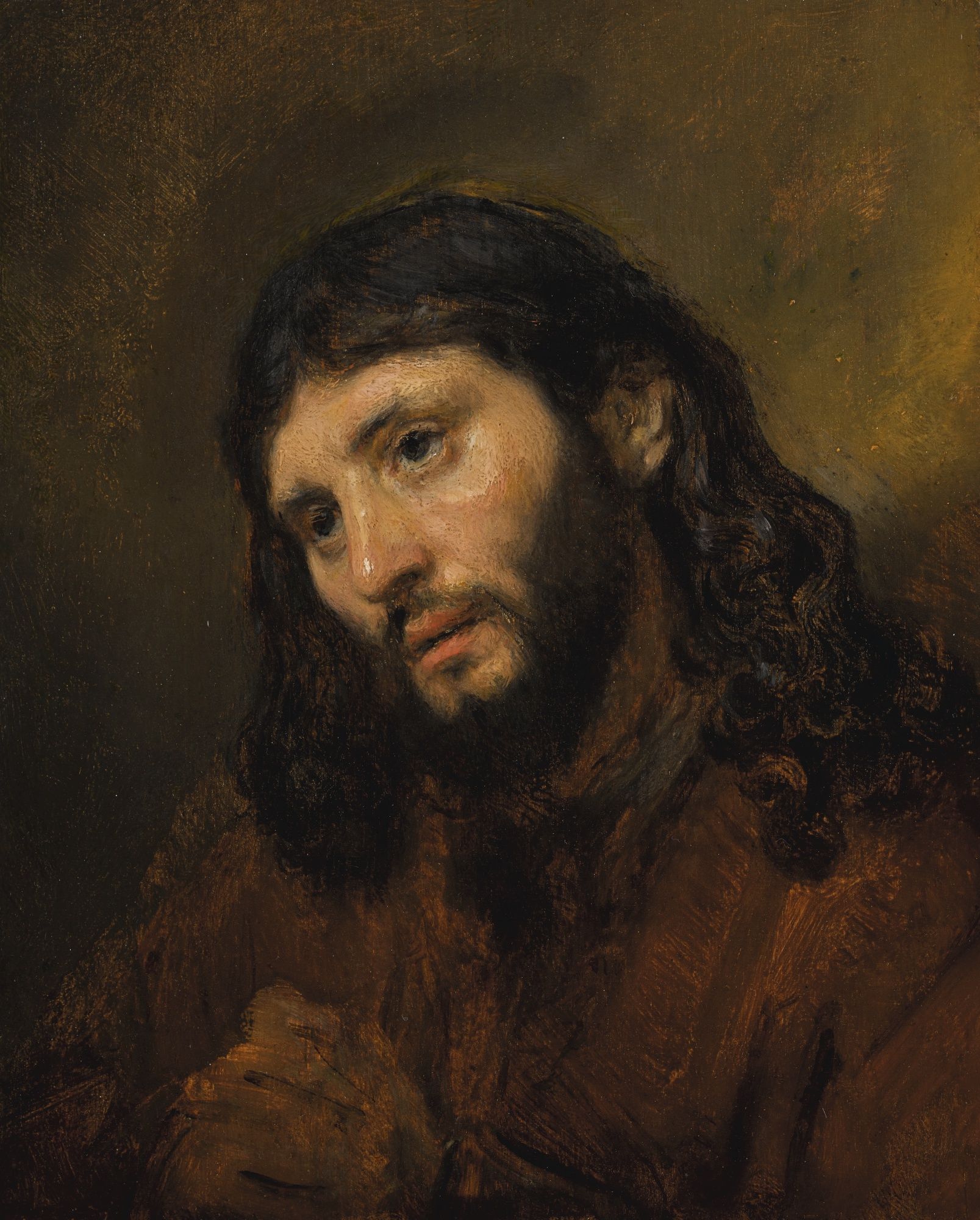
Louvre Abu Dhabi

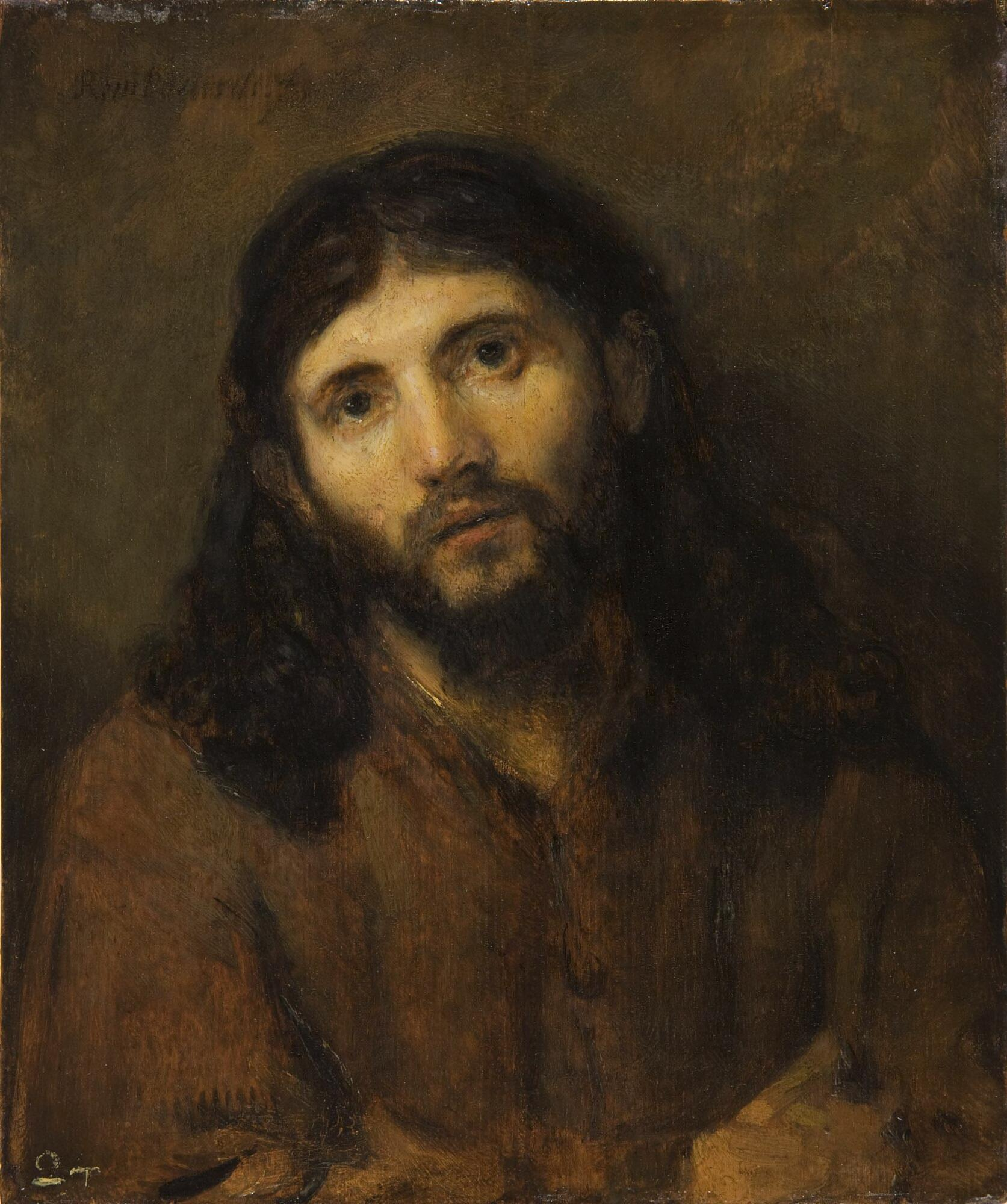
DIA

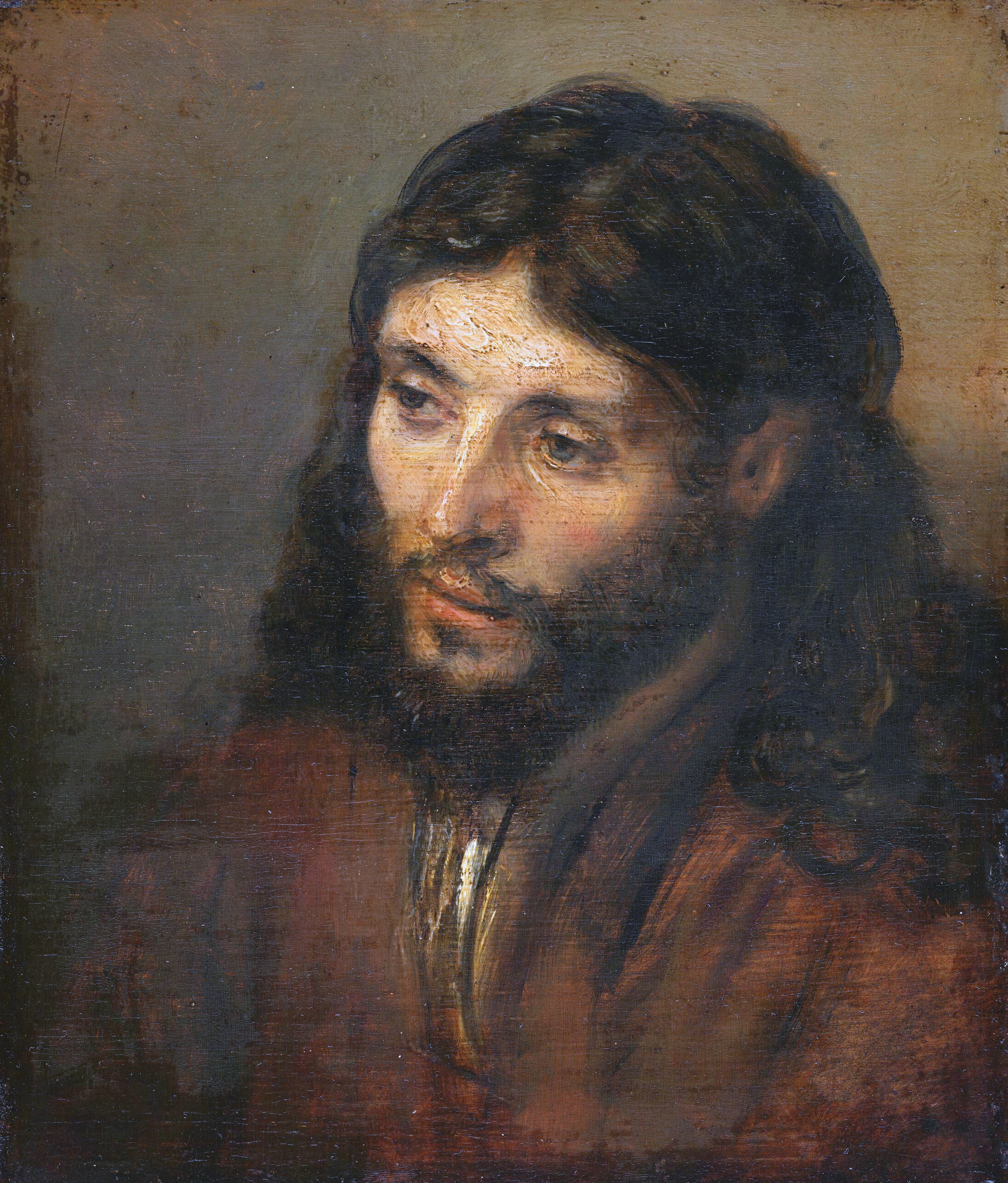
Berlin

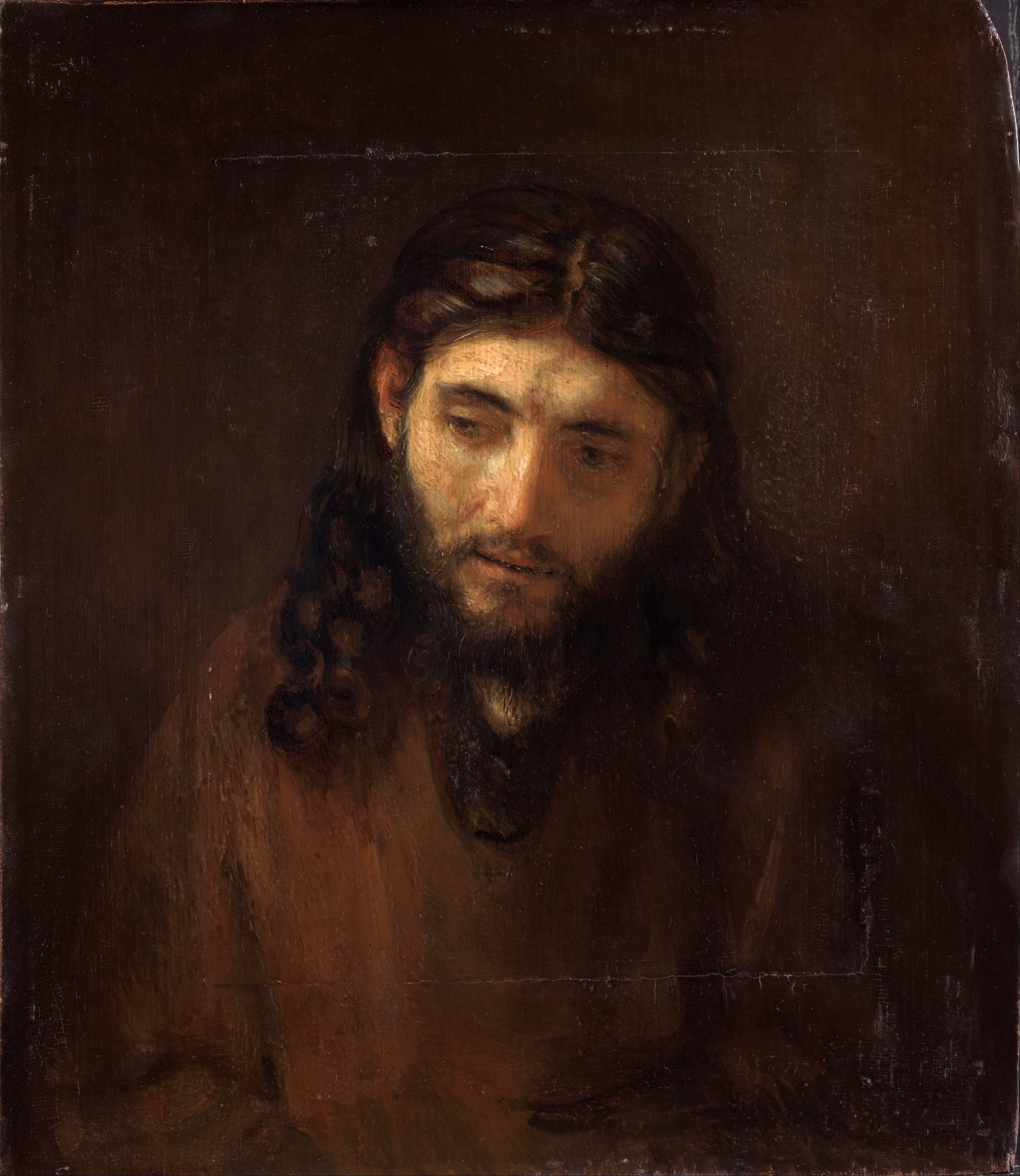
PMA

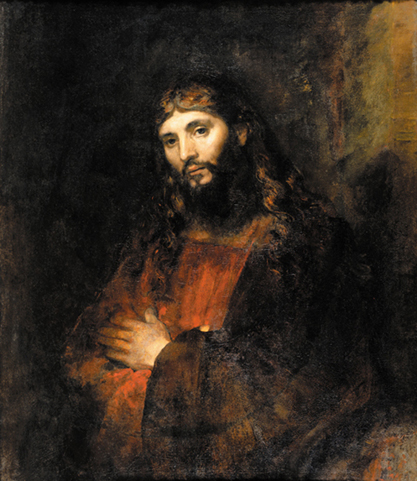
Hyde collection

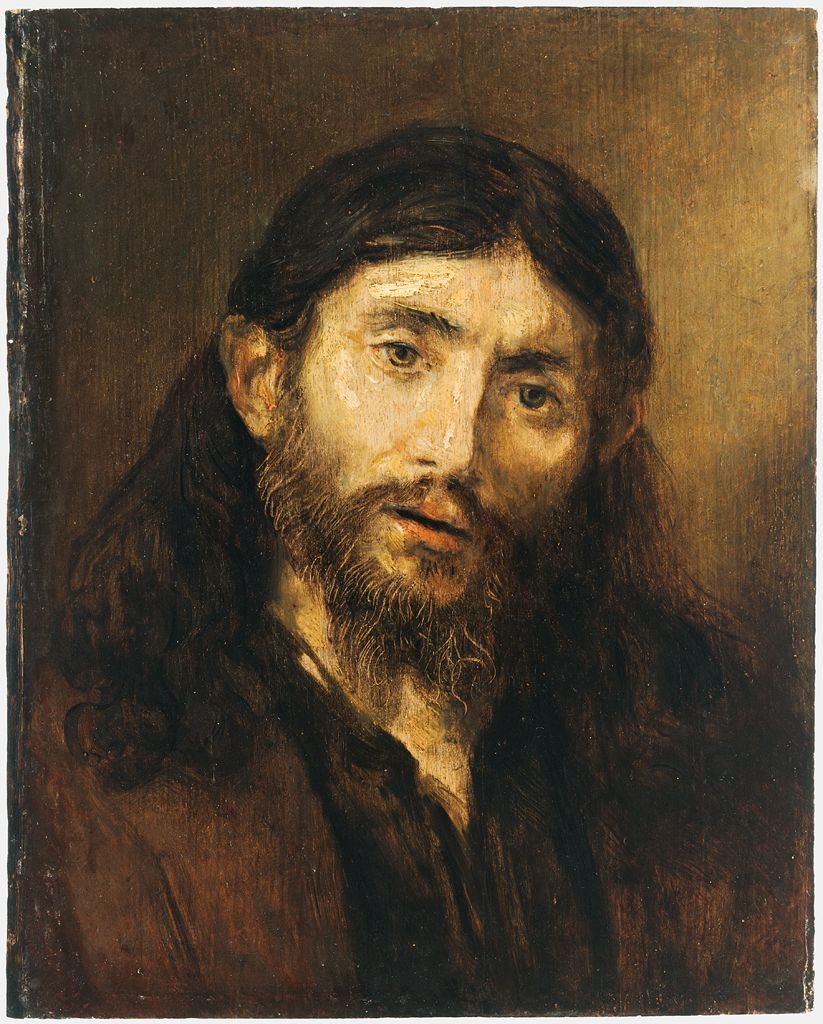
Fogg

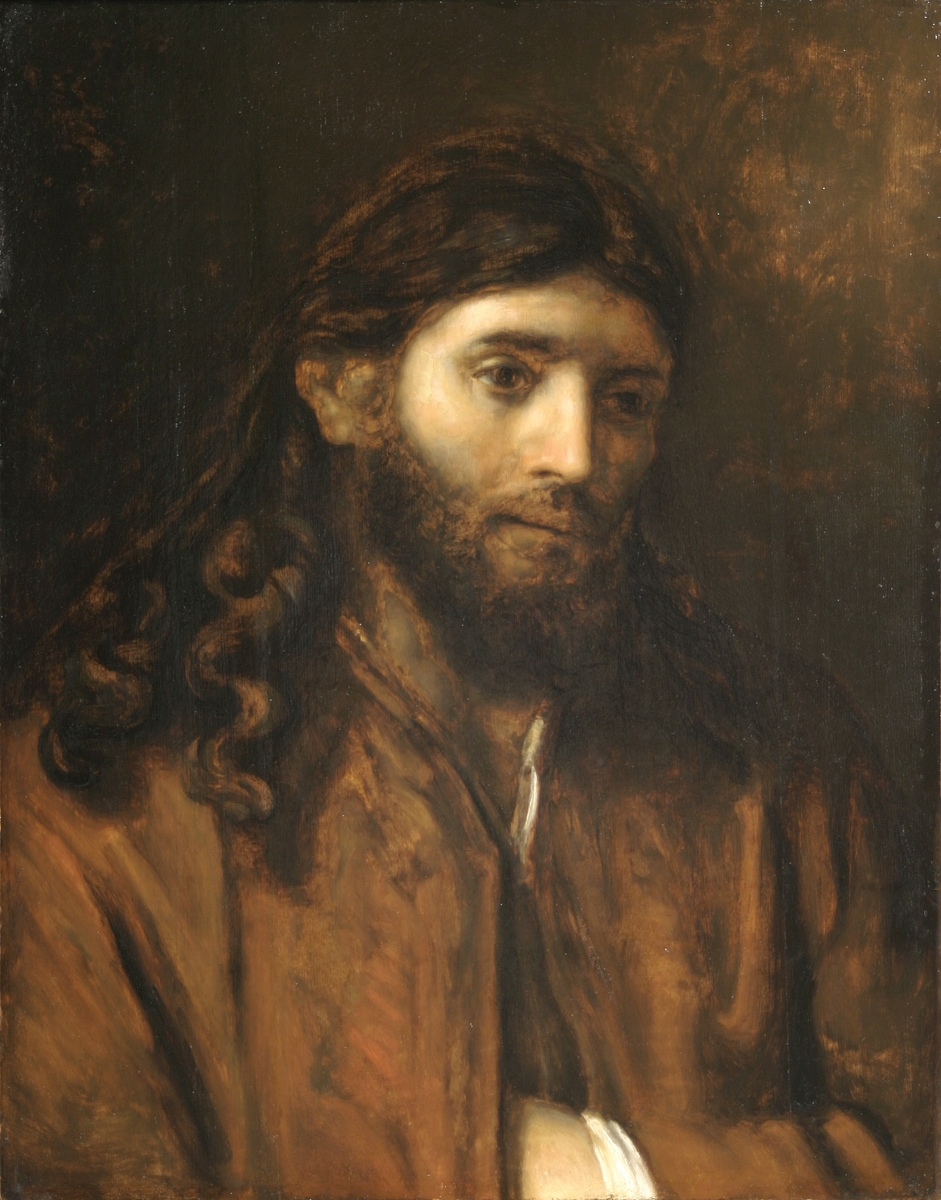
Brigham Young University
