= Self-portrait (Rembrandt, Indianapolis) =

1629 painting by Rembrandt

Self-Portrait
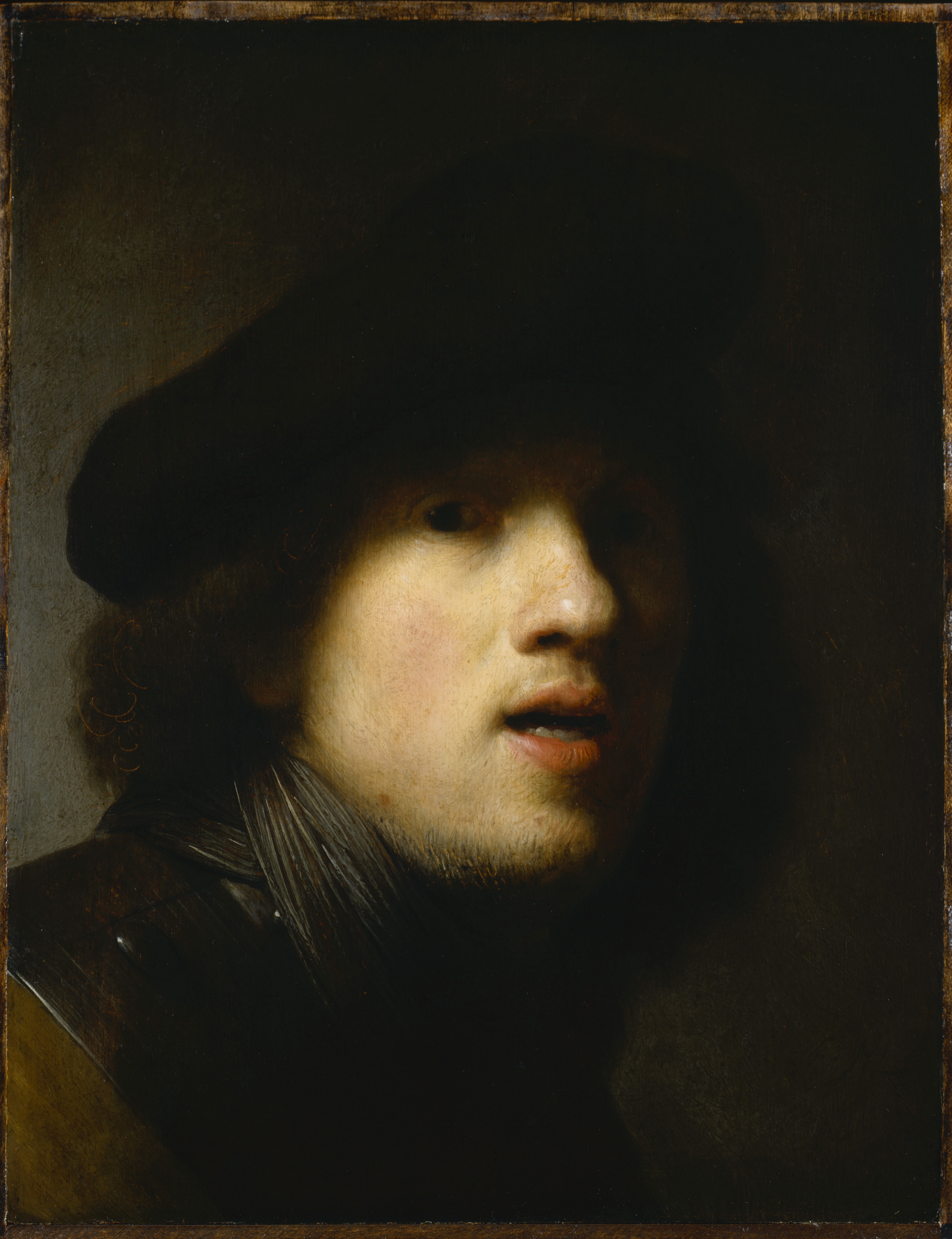
- Artist: Rembrandt van Rijn
- Year: 1629
- Type: Oil on wood
- Dimensions: 44 cm × 34 cm (17.5 in × 13.5 in)
- Location: Indianapolis Museum of Art, Indianapolis

This 1629 self-portrait by Dutch painter Rembrandt van Rijn is part of the Clowes Fund Collection of the Indianapolis Museum of Art in Indianapolis, Indiana. It is among the earliest of over 40 self-portraits by Rembrandt (possibly the first), which he produced over the course of four decades.

== Description ==
This is a portrait of studied spontaneity. His parted lips, tilted head, and leaning posture all evoke a moment of surprise and sudden animation, crafting a more dramatic encounter with the viewer. He wears what can best be described as a costume, culled from his collection of studio attire. This includes a scarf, a cap pulled low to give Rembrandt a dramatic shadow over his brow, and a steel gorget with a shiny, oversized rivet. Since Rembrandt never served in the militia, the gorget is sheer affectation.

Although he was only twenty-three when he made this painting, Rembrandt utilized an impressive array of artistic techniques to fill it with emotion and drama. Already, his characteristic lighting and dense atmosphere are visible. He used nearly monochromatic hues and incisive brushwork, delineating individual strands of hair by scratching into the wet paint, to create this emotionally charged portrait. Studies such as this enabled him to create his later great works of art, which portray so authentically the feelings of the subjects.

== Historical information ==
At the time of this portrait's creation, Rembrandt was still a young, uncelebrated painter in his hometown, Leiden. Working as the master of his own tiny workshop, he honed his craft. Samuel van Hoogstraten, who studied with Rembrandt, later wrote a painting manual advocating self-portraiture as practice for capturing emotion, since it allowed the painter to be "both performer and beholder." Rembrandt's followers endlessly emulated his self-portraits, creating a whole subgenre eagerly sought by collectors. Another, more quotidian explanation that has been offered for Rembrandt's predilection for self-portraits is that they eliminated the need to hire a professional model, a factor that would have been especially appealing when he was a young, struggling artist.

=== Attribution controversy ===
Rembrandt often used his self-portraits as teaching aids for his students, having them produce countless copies and variants both for their own edification and because they sold quite well. There are no fewer than five copies of this particular painting, which has led to some contention regarding its attribution over the decades. Art historian Abraham Bredius, who discovered it in a castle near Lvov in 1897, first presented it as an authentic Rembrandt, but Horst Gerson's revised Rembrandt catalogue reversed that opinion in 1969. Other scholars weighed in on both sides, before and after a 1966 cleaning. Technical examinations including X-radiography in 1979 settled the matter, and the work is now accepted as Rembrandt's own. The X-radiographs revealed extensive pentimenti where Rembrandt altered the angles of his shoulders and head, and his hat's position. This indicates that the work is an original composition, rather than a mere copy.

There is further specific evidence in favor of this attribution which does not require advanced equipment to discern. The painting bears the monogram RHL, which was used by Rembrandt during his years in Leiden. These initials were added when the paint was still wet, and do not appear on any of the copies. Furthermore, this portrait includes several blemishes on Rembrandt's chin. While he himself always recorded his face with all its wrinkles and imperfections, his students tended to gloss over such evidence of humanity.

=== Acquisition ===
Dr. G.H.A. Clowes purchased this painting in 1951, ending its circulation among the noble families of Poland. The Clowes family gave it to the IMA in 1959. It has the accession number C10063 and is currently on view in the Clowes Pavilion.

== See also ==
- Self-portraits by Rembrandt
- List of paintings by Rembrandt
