= Raising of the Cross (study, Rembrandt) =

Painting by Rembrandt

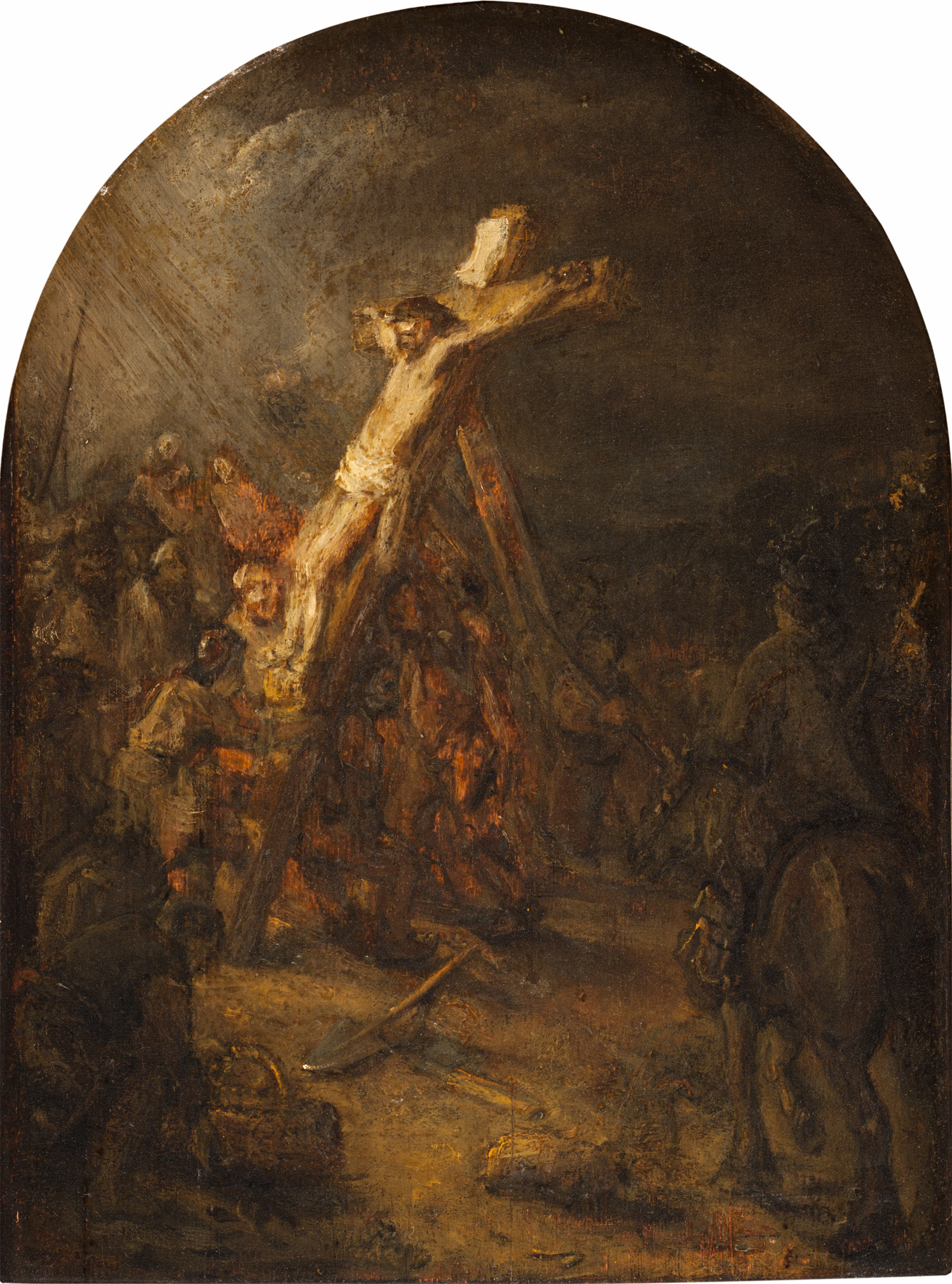
- Artist: Rembrandt
- Year: 1630s
- Catalogue: Rembrandt catalogue raisonné, 1935, by Abraham Bredius: #564
- Medium: oil paint, panel
- Subject: Raising of the Cross
- Dimensions: 39 cm (15 in) × 30 cm (12 in)

Raising of the Cross (Dutch: Kruisoprichting) is a circa 1633–1645 painting by the Dutch Golden Age painter Rembrandt in the collection of the Museum Bredius. It was assumed to have been painted as a study for Rembrandt's larger painting of the same subject, as part of a series commissioned in 1633 by Frederick Henry, Prince of Orange. Having been rejected as autograph by the Rembrandt Research Project after Abraham Bredius's death, it was recently reattributed to the master by Jeroen Giltaij, though dendrochronology indicates the wood for the panel was not felled before 1642.

== Catalogued as Rembrandt ==
This painting was documented as a study by Hofstede de Groot in 1915, who wrote:

131. The Elevation of the Cross. Sm. 92. A study for the Munich picture (130). [" This masterly study, apparently for the preceding picture, is composed of a number of figures, among which is seen conspicuously the Saviour attached to the Cross, which several men are in the act of raising. An officer, mounted on a brown horse, with his back to the spectator, is on the left, and on the opposite side may be noticed a man stooping to take something from a basket. The gloom which prevails is partly relieved by a stream of light bursting from the midst of dark clouds. Painted in a free and spirited manner" (Sm.).]
Panel, 15 1/2 inches by 11 1/2 inches.

Exhibited at the British Institution, London, 1834, No. 85.

Sale. Sir Charles Bagot, London, June 17, 1836 (Brondgeest). "

His entry was copied from Smith in 1836, who wrote:

92. The Elevation of the Cross. This masterly study, apparently for the preceding picture, is composed of a number of figures, among which is seen conspicuously the Saviour attached to the cross, which several men are in the act of raising. An officer, mounted on a brown horse, with his back to the spectator, is on the left, and on the opposite side may be noticed a man stooping to take something from a basket. The gloom which prevails is partially relieved by a stream of lioht bursting from the midst of dark clouds. Painted in a free and spirited manner.
1 ft. 3 1/2 in. by 11 1/2 in.— P.
Now in the collection of the Right Hon. Sir Charles Bagot, K.C.

Abraham Bredius bought the painting in 1921 as a genuine Rembrandt and included it in his 1935 catalog raisonné. Kurt Bauch expressed doubts about the work, and Horst Gerson called it a "crude imitation, vaguely based on Rembrandt".

== See also ==
- List of paintings by Rembrandt
