= Head of Christ (Rembrandt, Philadelphia) =

Painting by Rembrandt's workshop

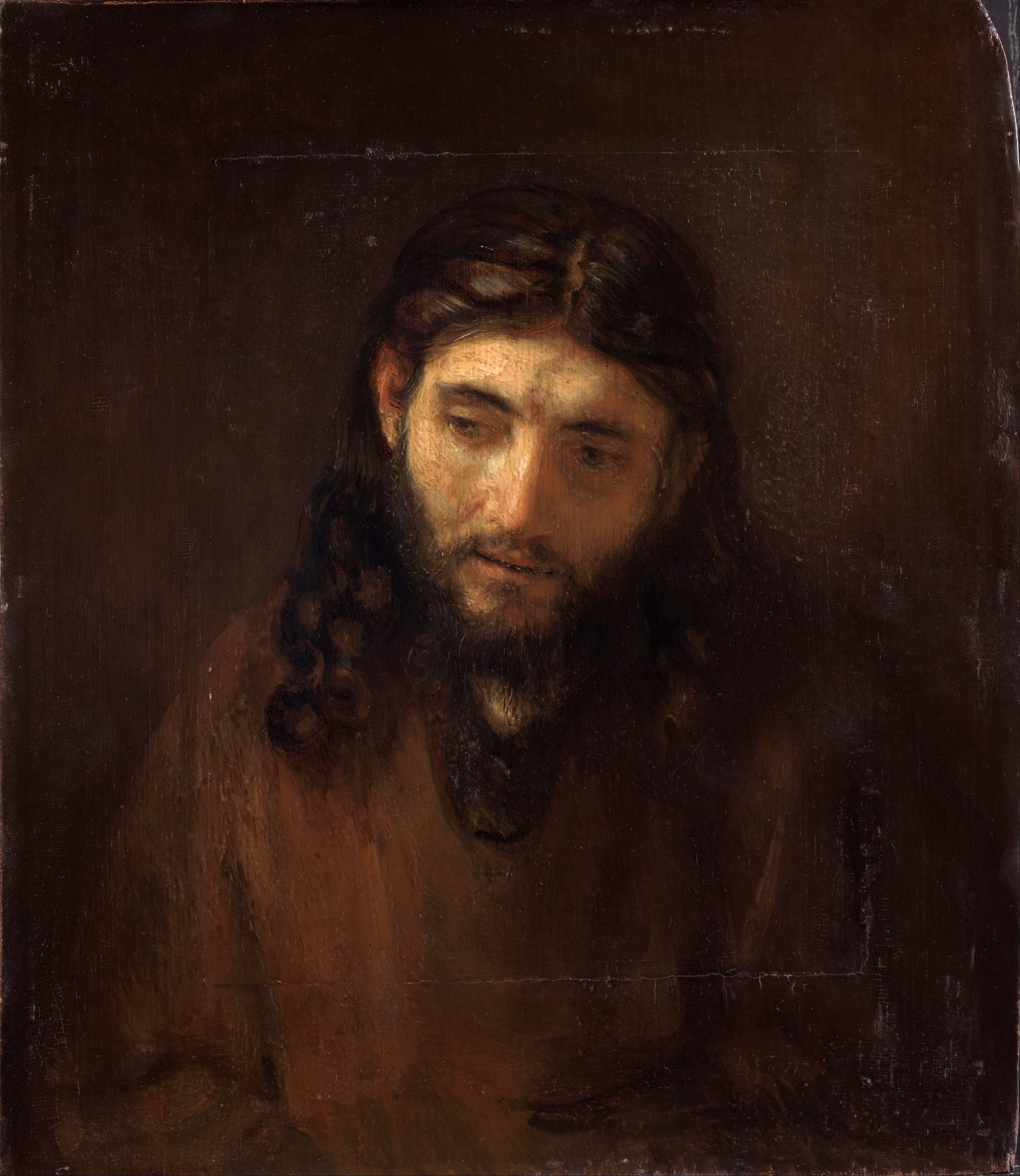
- Artist: Rembrandt
- Year: 1600s
- Medium: oil paint, oak panel
- Dimensions: 35.8 cm (14.1 in) × 31.2 cm (12.3 in)
- Location: Philadelphia Museum of Art
- Owner: John G. Johnson, Charles Sedelmeyer
- Collection: Philadelphia Museum of Art, Charles Sedelmeyer collection
- Accession no.: Cat. 480
- Identifiers: RKDimages ID: 232218

Head of Christ is a 17th-century painting by Rembrandt's workshop. It shows Christ with a beard and long dark hair. It is in the collection of the Philadelphia Museum of Art, in Philadelphia, Pennsylvania.

== Description ==
Rembrandt created several similar heads in varying poses, possibly as devotional objects. Today about a dozen are known. This one came into the collection via the John G. Johnson bequest. This face of Christ relates very closely to depictions found in two prints by Rembrandt that portray Christ preaching to an attentive audience.

This painting was documented by Hofstede de Groot in 1914, who wrote; "163. HEAD OF CHRIST. Wb. 324; B.-HdG. 412. Almost in full face. Long dark curls and a thin full beard. In a reddish-brown cloak. Half-length, about half life size. Painted about 1656-58. Oak panel, 13 inches by 11 1/2 inches. Mentioned by Vosmaer, p. 555; by Bode, p. 523; by Dutuit, p. 53. In the collection of Madame de Saulcy, Paris. In the collection of the Comte de la Bégassière, Paris. In the possession of the Paris dealer C. Sedelmeyer, "Catalogue of 100 Paintings," vii. No. 33. In the collection of John G. Johnson, Philadelphia, 1914 catalogue, No. 480."

The painting was included in most Rembrandt catalogs of the 20th-century, only recently being rejected as an autograph by the latest RRP catalog. It is, however, still connected with Rembrandt's workshop and is grouped together with all the other versions. In 2004, dendrochronological analysis determined that the source of the oak panel—both the original from the seventeenth century—and the main one came from the Baltic/Polish regions. The analysis yielded a probable creation date of 1628 or later. It was included in the 2011 exhibition "Rembrandt and the Face of Jesus" held in the museums of Detroit (DIA), Philadelphia (PMA) and Paris (Louvre) from April 21, 2011 – to February 12, 2012, no. 40.

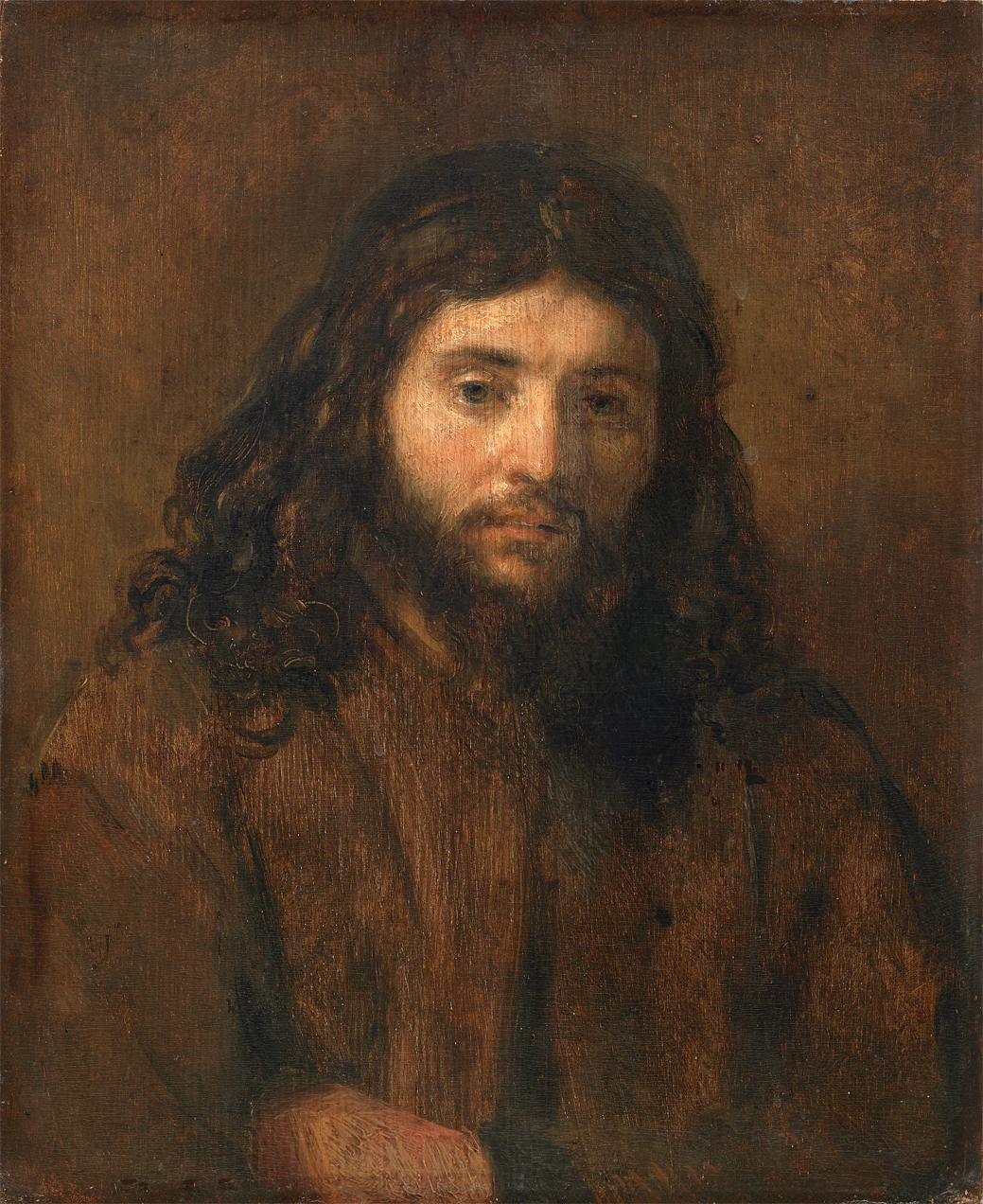
Bredius

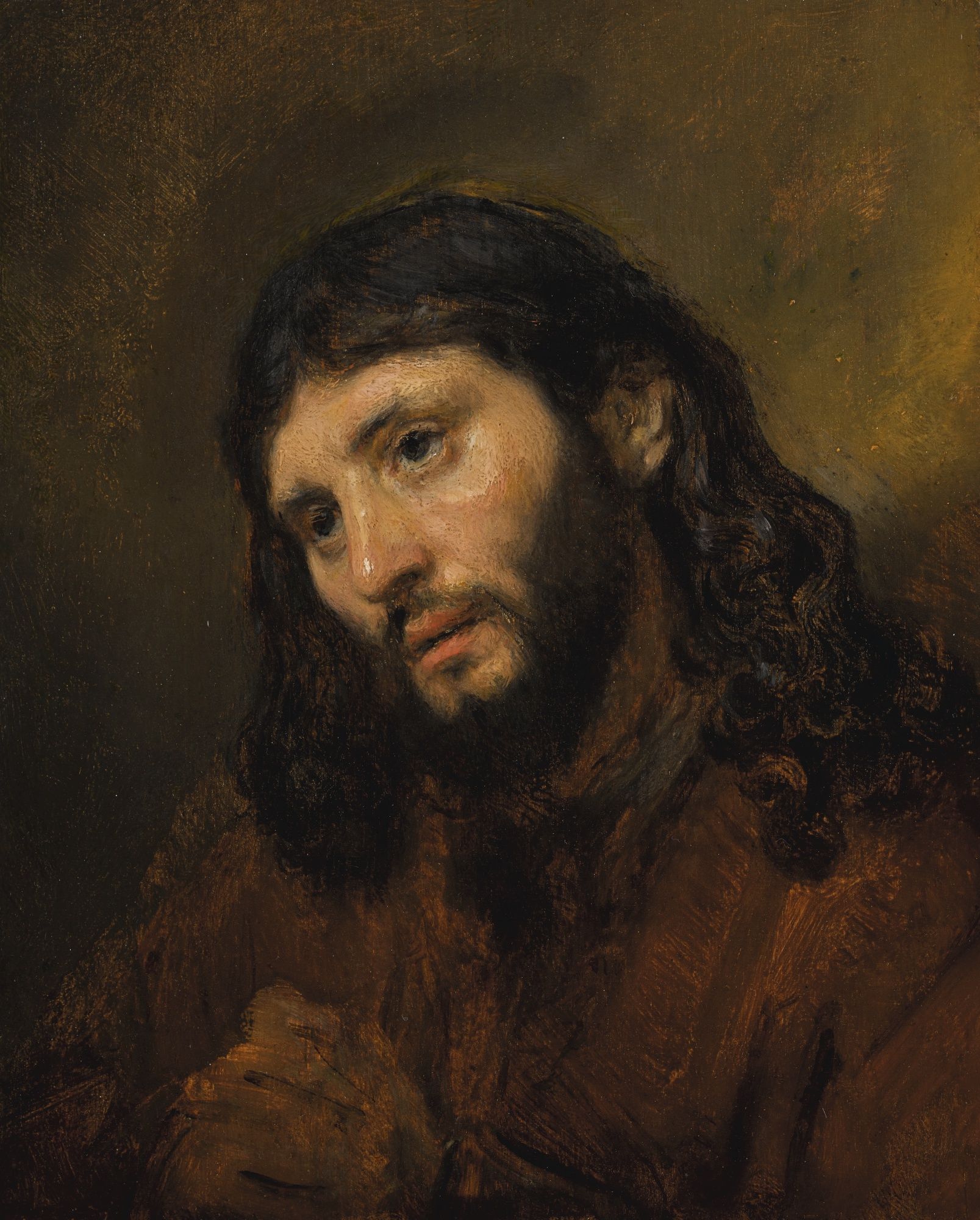
Louvre Abu Dhabi

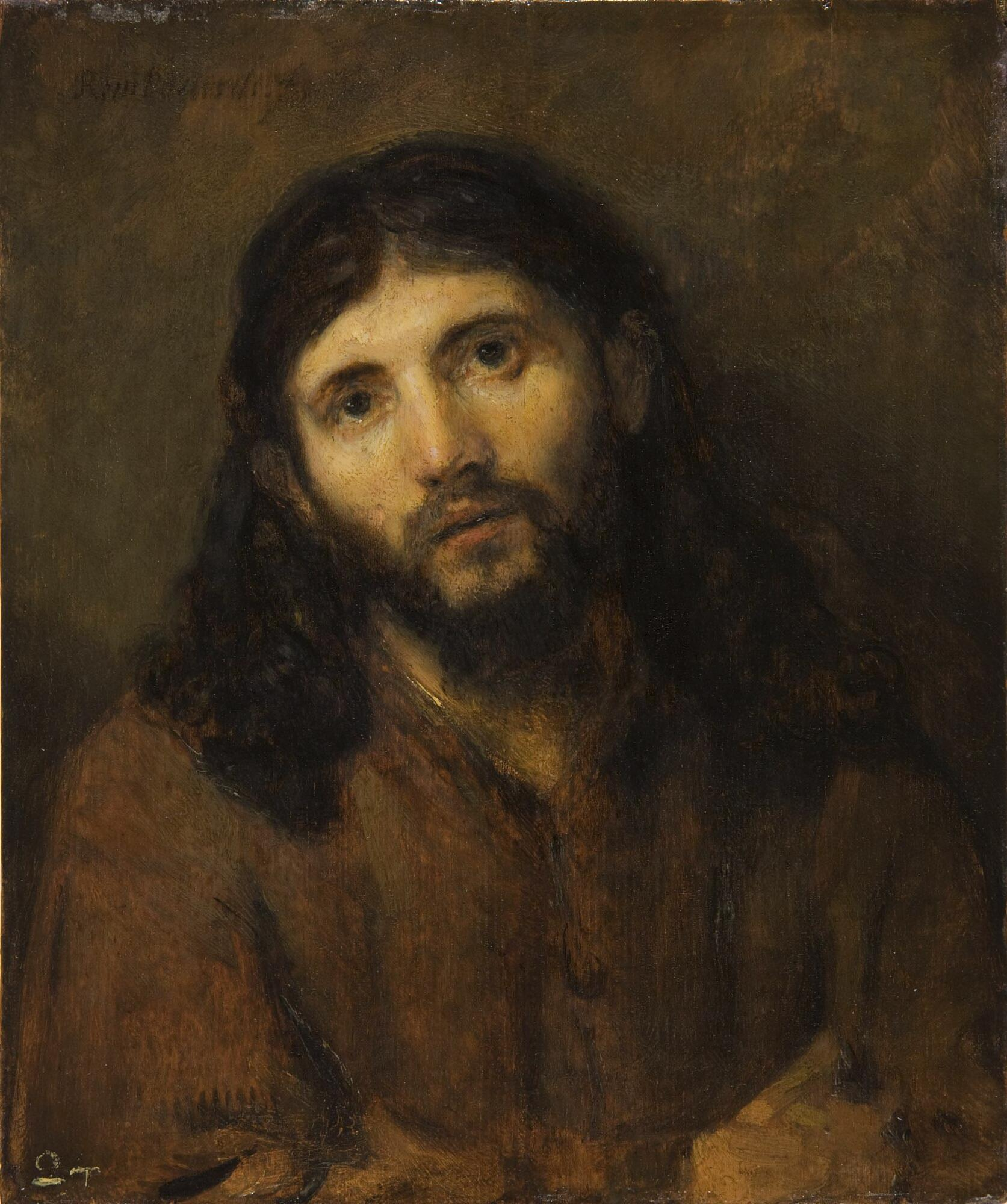
DIA

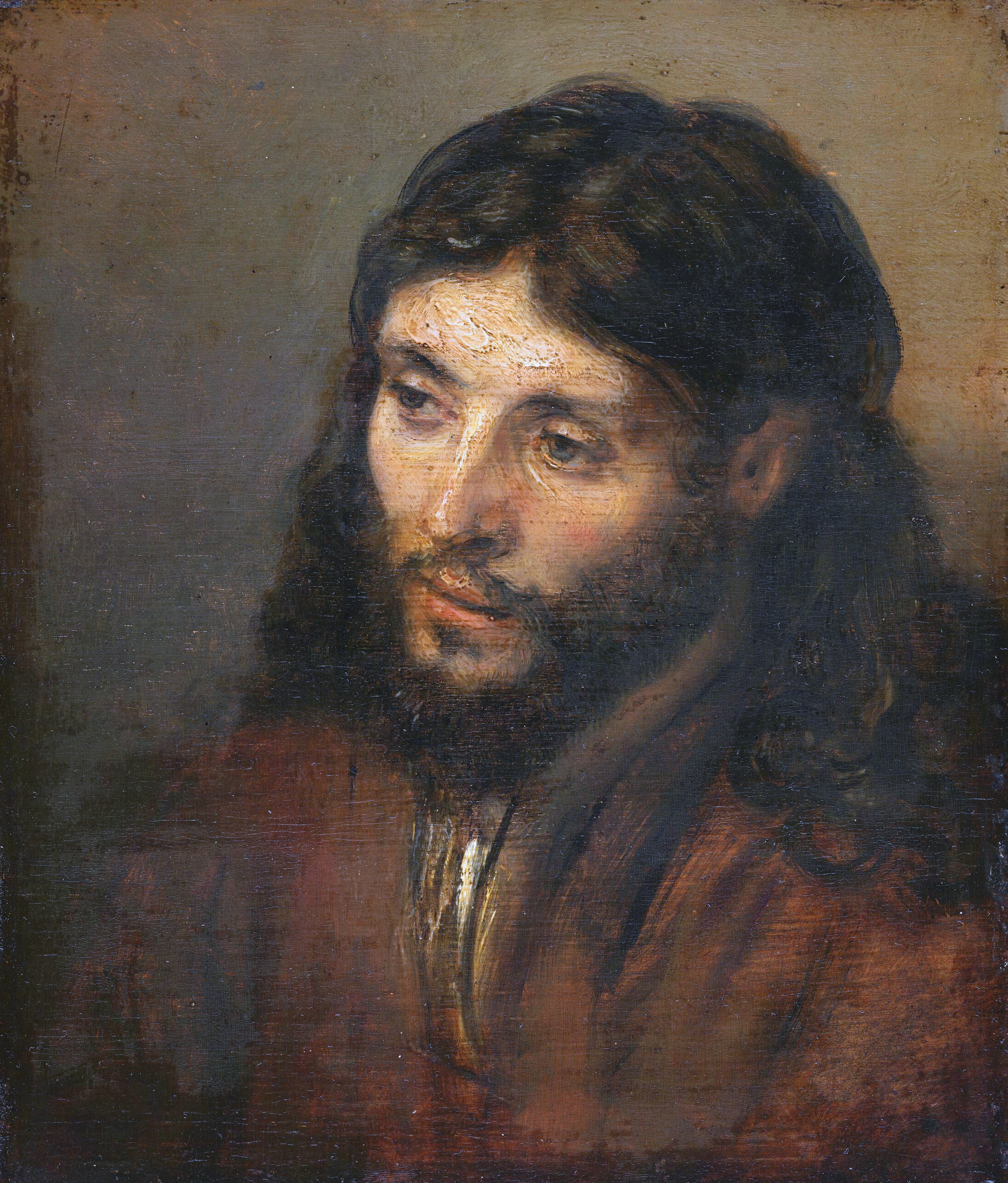
Berlin

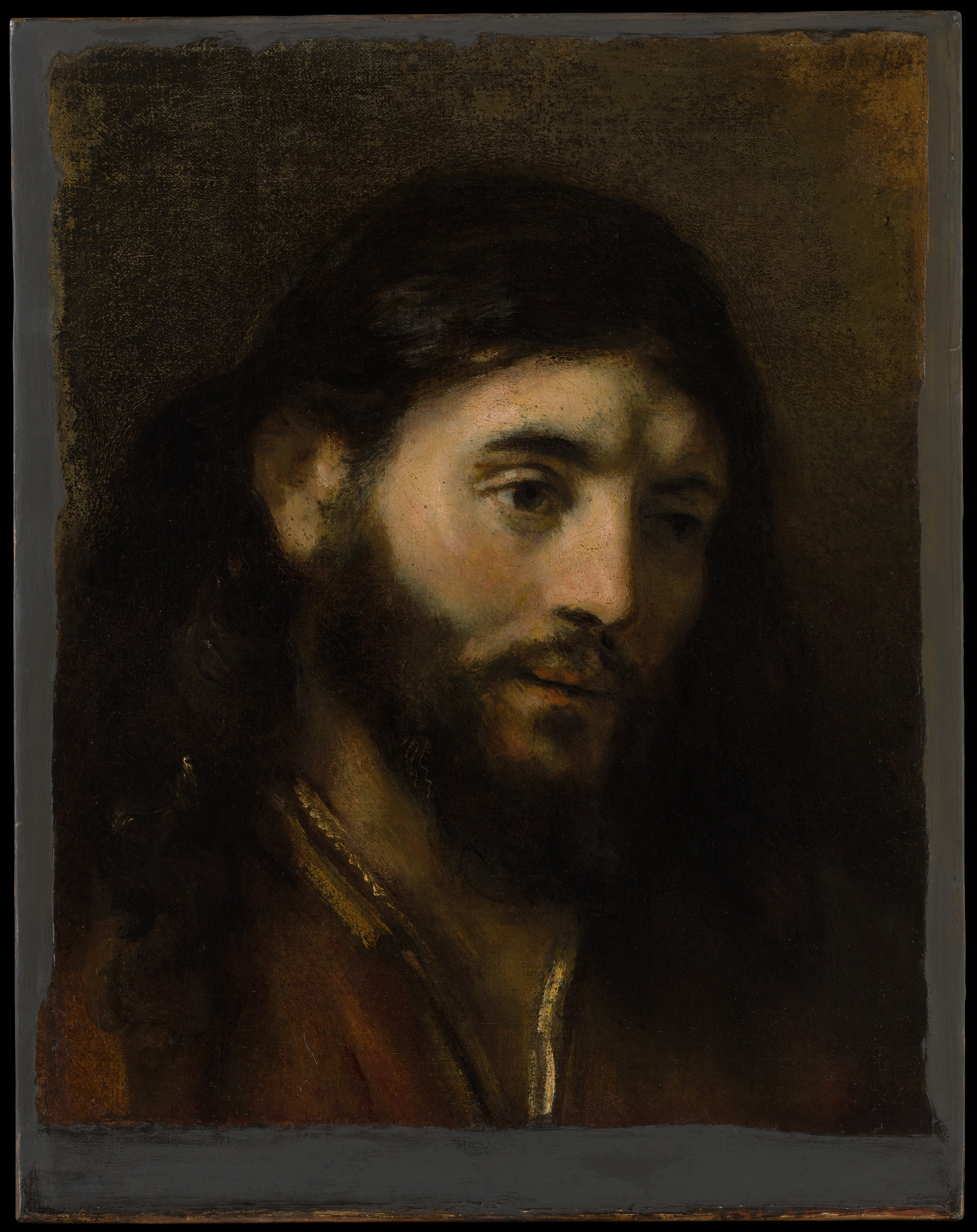
New York

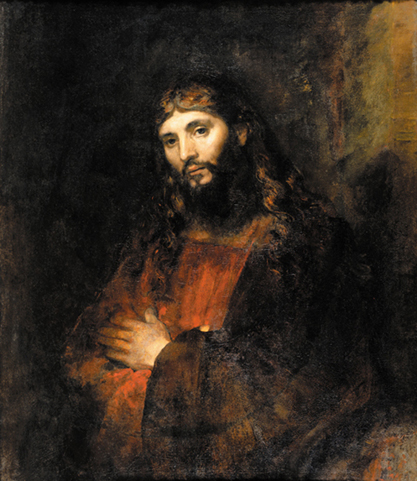
Hyde collection

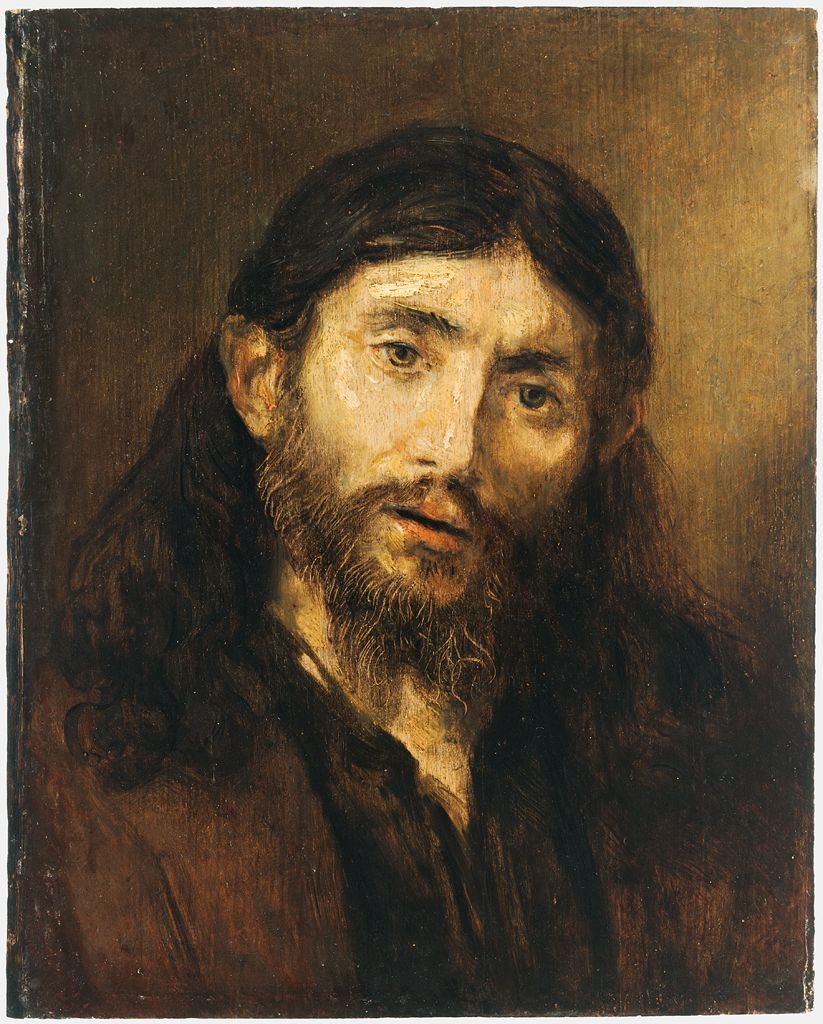
Fogg

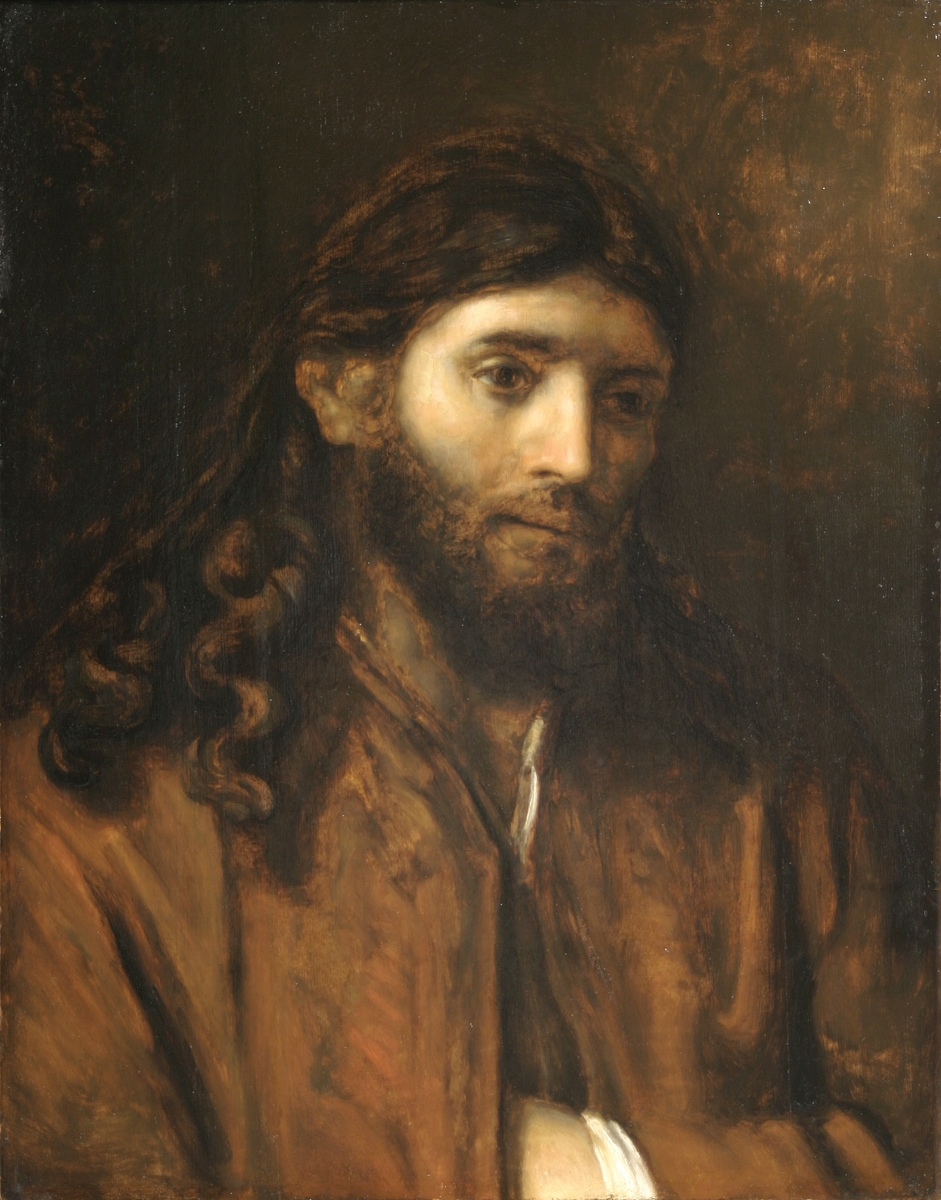
Brigham Young University
