= Raising of the Cross (Rembrandt) =

Painting by Rembrandt

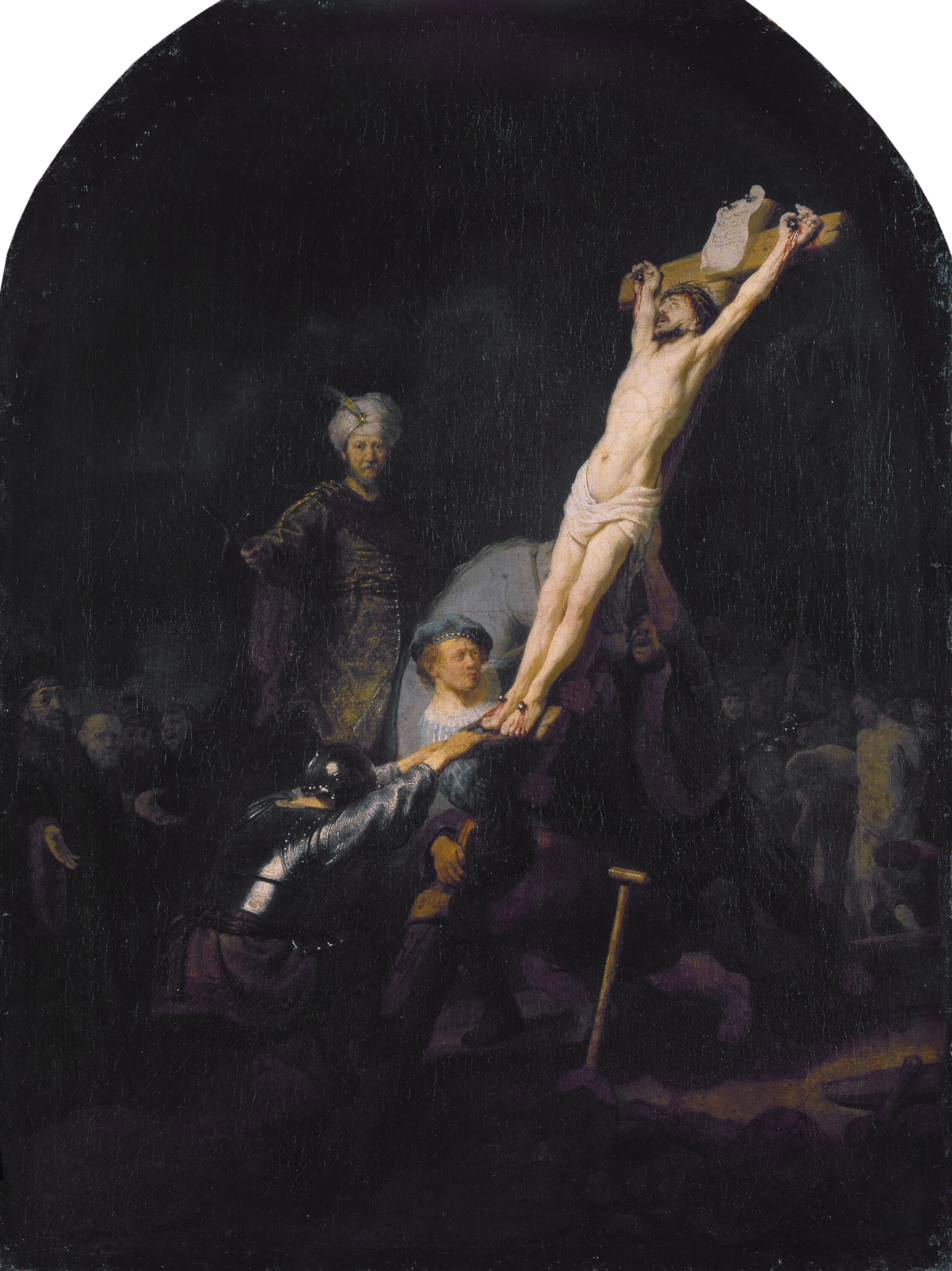
- Artist: Rembrandt
- Year: c. 1633
- Catalogue: A Corpus of Rembrandt Paintings VI, by the Rembrandt Research Project: #106
- Medium: oil paint, canvas
- Dimensions: 96.2 cm (37.9 in) × 72.2 cm (28.4 in)

Raising of the Cross (German: Kreuzaufrichtung) is a 1633 painting by the Dutch Golden Age painter Rembrandt in the collection of the Alte Pinakothek. It was painted as part of a "passion" series commissioned in 1633 by Frederick Henry, Prince of Orange. Together with its pendant, The Descent from the Cross, it is one of the rare paintings by Rembrandt with a continuous provenance from the date of completion to today.

== Catalogued as Rembrandt ==
This painting was documented by Hofstede de Groot in 1915, who wrote:

130. The Elevation of the Cross. Sm. 91. Bode, 106; Dut. 81; Wb. 101; B.-HdG. 124. — In the centre foreground, the Cross, to which Christ is fastened, is raised from the right by four executioners. The man on the left of the group wears a cuirass and helmet. The man in the centre, wearing a light blue coat, has the features and the familiar blue cap of the painter. Two other men, in shadow to the right, support the Cross from the back. Behind this group is the Roman centurion on a grey horse; he wears a rich Eastern dress, consisting of a light turban, a coat of gold brocade with a sash, and a deep purple cloak. He leans his right hand, grasping a mace, on his hip. To the left, in half shadow, is a group of four Pharisees. To the right, farther back, soldiers bring forward the two thieves. A night scene. Full light falls from the left on the body of Christ, who casts His eyes upward as if in pain. Small full-length figures. Produced at the same time as its pendant, "The Descent from the Cross" (134), which was painted in 1633.
Canvas, rounded at top, 38 inches by 28 1/2 inches.

Engraved by Hess.
A copy was in the sale : — J. Durlacher, Frankfort-on-Main, December 11, 1906, No. 118.
A chalk drawing for the picture is in the Albertina, Vienna, HdG. 1423. Mentioned by Vosmaer, pp. 119, 497; by Bode, p. 434; by Dutuit, p. 30; by Michel, pp. 157, 554 [120, 438]; by Hofstede de Groot, Urkunden uber Rembrandt, No. 48.
In the collection of Frederick Henry, Prince of Orange, for whom Rembrandt painted it in 1633.
In the collection of the Prince's widow, Amalia von Solms, at the Oude Hof, The Hague, 1667 inventory, No. 69; but not in the inventories of the goods divided among her four daughters.
Probably, therefore, in the collection of her grandson William III., Prince of Orange and King of England, till 1702.
In the collection of Johann Wilhelm, Elector Palatine (who died in 1716), Düsseldorf, No. 215; see Van Gool, ii. 538. Transferred to Munich in 1806.

In the Aeltere Pinakothek, Munich, 1911 catalogue, No. 327."

Before him, Smith wrote in 1836:

91. The Elevation of the Cross. The composition of this picture exhibits the Saviour naked all but the loins, attached to a lofty cross, which several men are exerting their efforts to raise; one of them, partly clad in armour, is pulling in front; while a second is aiding behind, and a third is at the side. The ceremony is directed by an officer habited in the Asiatic costume, mounted on horseback, with a club in his hand. Several spectators surround the cross, and at some little distance off may be perceived the two malefactors preparing to suffer. The sky is surcharged with dark clouds, and a deep and solemn gloom is shed over the affecting scene. Engraved

by Hess.

2 ft. 10 in. by 2 ft. 1 in.— C. (arched.)
Now in the Public Gallery at Munich.

== See also ==
- List of paintings by Rembrandt
- Rembrandt's study for this painting, now in Museum Bredius
