= Portrait of a Man with Arms Akimbo =

1658 painting by Rembrandt

- Portret van een man met de handen in de zij (Dutch)
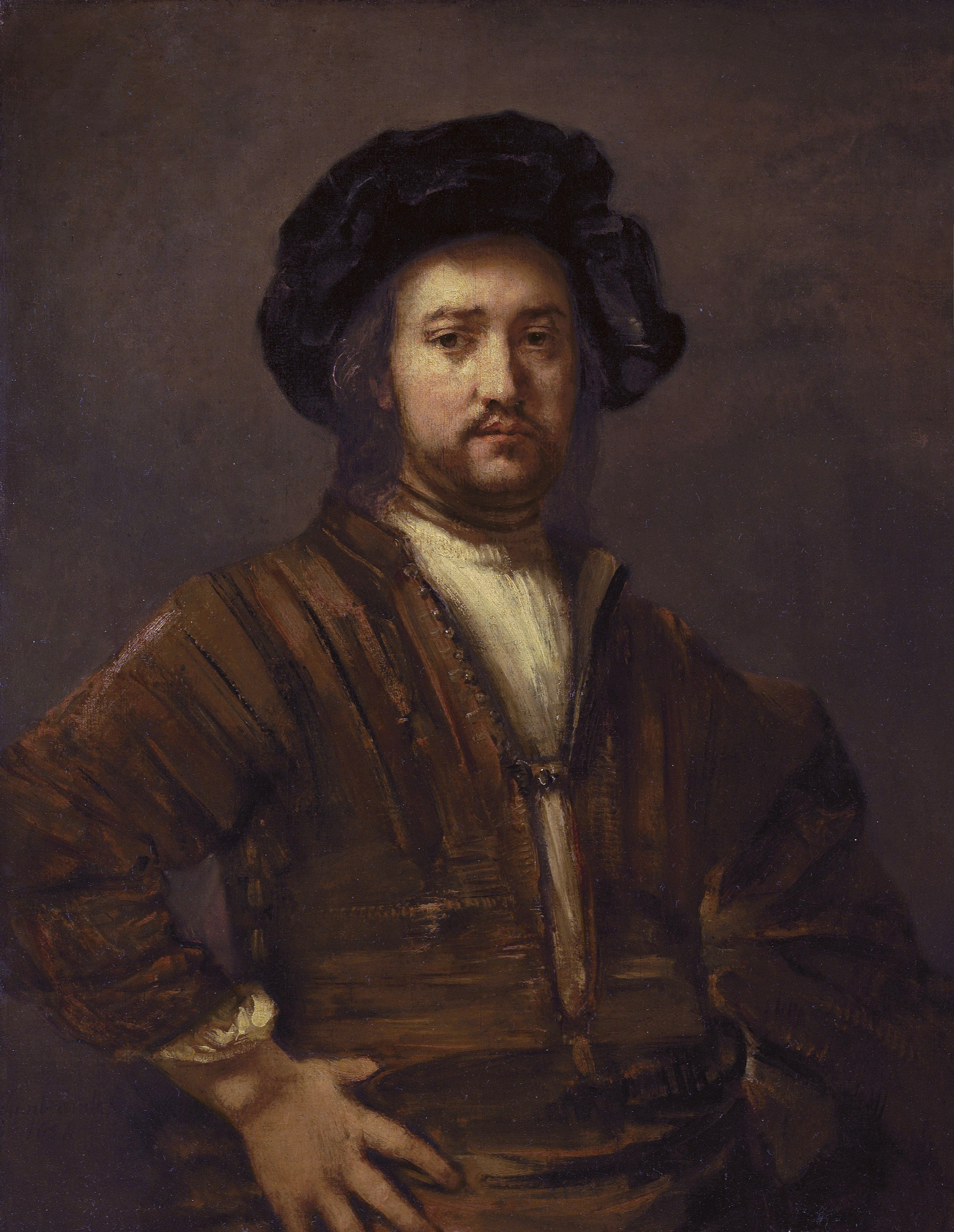
- Portrait of a man with arms akimbo
- Artist: Rembrandt
- Year: 1658
- Catalogue: Rembrandt Research Project, A Corpus of Rembrandt Paintings VI: #261
- Medium: Oil on canvas
- Dimensions: 107.4 cm × 87 cm (42.3 in × 34 in)
- Location: Agnes Etherington Art Centre, Kingston, Ontario

Portrait of a Man with Arms Akimbo, formerly known as Portrait of a Foreign Admiral or Portrait of a Dutch Admiral, is an oil painting portrait by Rembrandt signed and dated 1658. It is now in the collection of the Agnes Etherington Art Centre at Queen's University in Kingston, Ontario, and measures 107.4 cm by 87.0 cm.

The painting was rediscovered in December 2009 after being off public display for around forty years. It was purchased by Steve Wynn at Christie's in December 2009 for £20 million, the highest price ever paid for a painting by Rembrandt. In 2011 it was purchased by Isabel and Alfred Bader. They offered it for sale at the 2011 TEFAF art show in Maastricht for 47 million euros. The Baders donated the painting to the Agnes Etherington Art Centre in December 2015.

== Provenance ==
This painting was documented by Hofstede de Groot in 1915, who wrote: "827a. A Dutch Admiral. Exhibited at the British Institution, London, 1847, No. 45. In the collection of George Folliot." In 2021, with the help of HTR, the depicted man was identified by researchers at the Amsterdam City Archives as the master carpenter Jacob Wesselsz Wiltingh, as opposed to an admiral as had previously been believed. It was sold in May 1930 from the Folliot collection, but was in the Columbia University art collection when Horst Gerson cataloged it in 1968. It was purchased for a reputed $185,000 by Huntington Hartford, of A & P supermarket chain wealth, who donated it to the university in 1958.

== See also ==
- List of paintings by Rembrandt
