= The Descent from the Cross (Rembrandt, 1633) =

1633 painting by Rembrandt

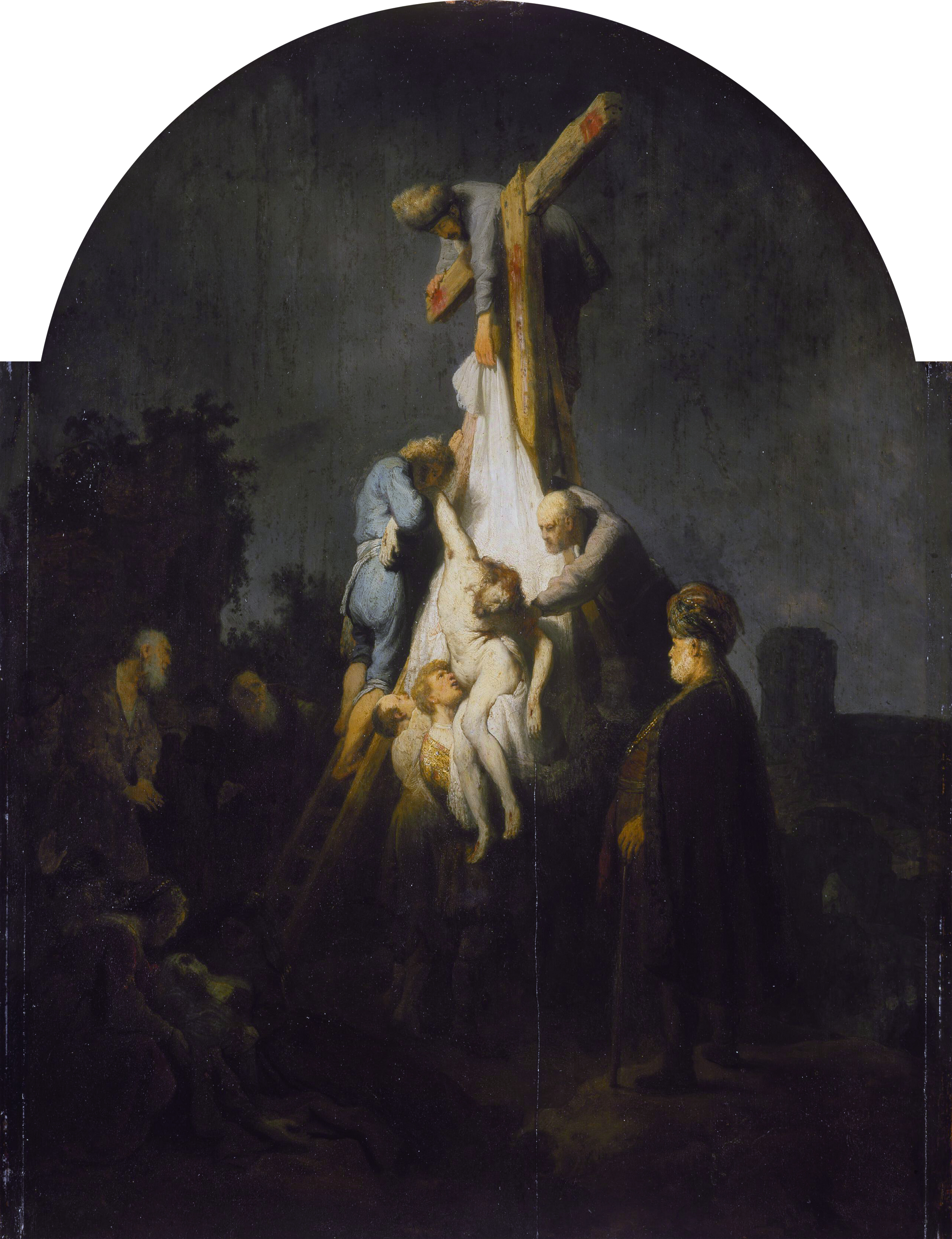
The Descent from the Cross

The Descent from the Cross is a 1633 painting of the Descent from the Cross by Rembrandt. It is now in the Alte Pinakothek in Munich. It is a companion piece to Rembrandt's later The Raising of the Cross.

== See also ==
- List of paintings by Rembrandt

== Sources ==
- https://web.archive.org/web/20120217191016/http://www.pinakothek.de/rembrandt-harmensz-van-rijn/kreuzabnahme-christi
