= Abraham Bredius =

Dutch art collector (1855–1946)

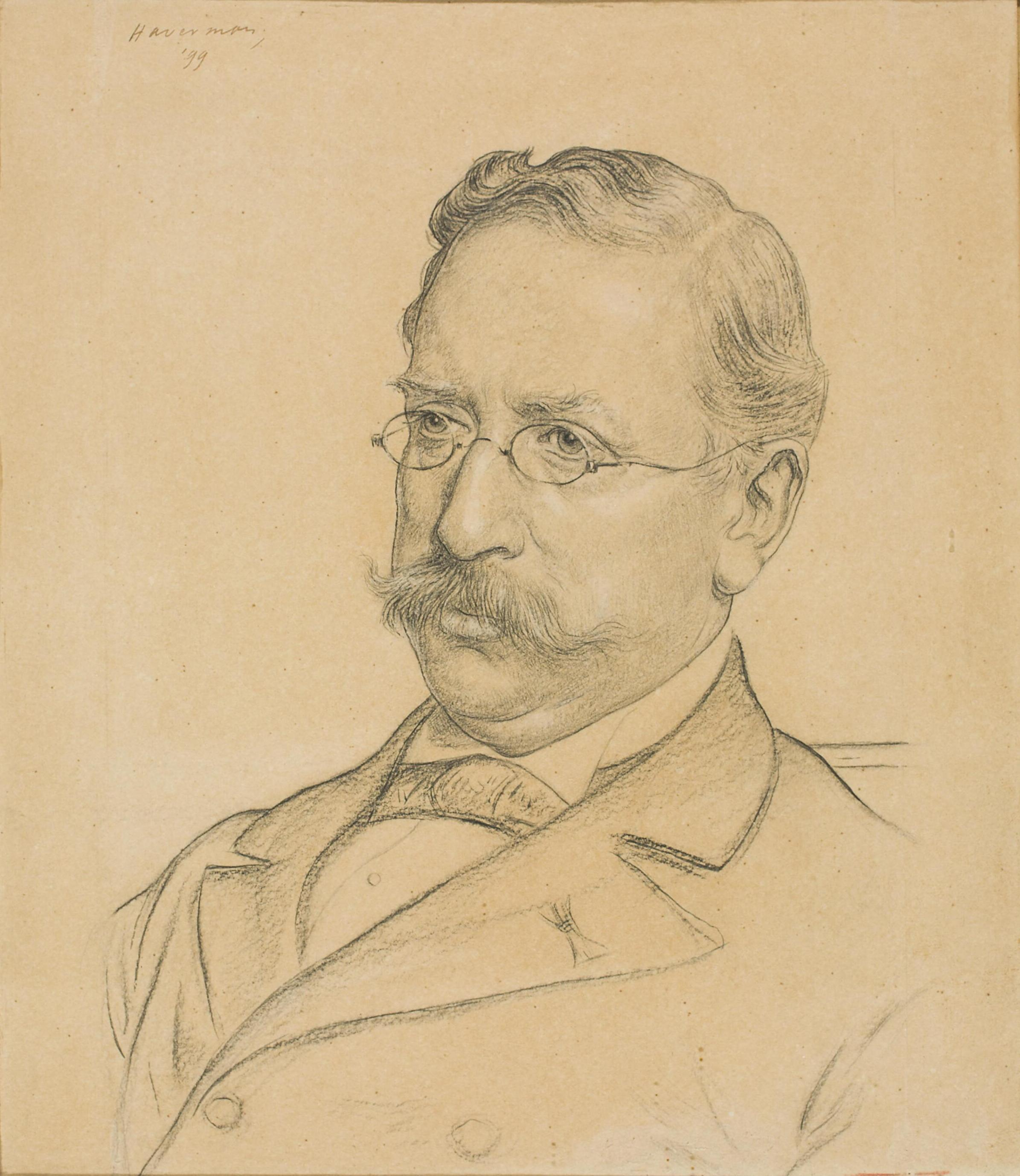
- Bredius, by Hendrik Haverman, 1899
- Born: 18 April 1855; Amsterdam, Netherlands
- Died: 13 March 1946 (aged 90); Monaco
- Occupation(s): Art collector, art historian, museum curator

Abraham Bredius (18 April 1855 – 13 March 1946) was a Dutch art collector, art historian, and museum curator.

== Life ==
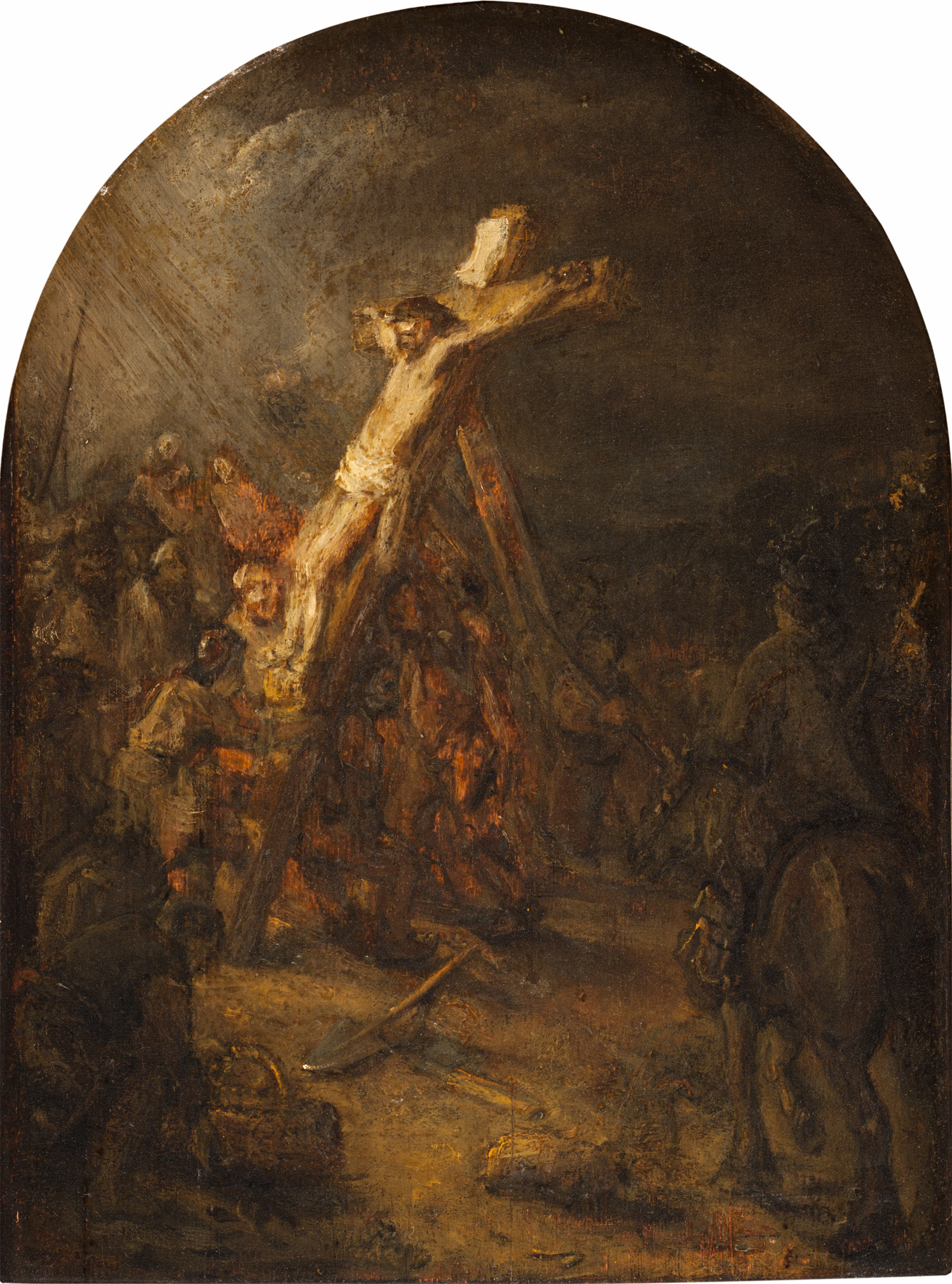
In 1921, Bredius bought Raising of the Cross by Dutch painter Rembrandt. The painting is still located in the Museum Bredius today.

Bredius travelled widely, visiting various art collections in his youth, and worked at the Dutch Museum for History and Art before becoming director, from 1889 to 1909, of the Mauritshuis. He became a Rembrandt expert who had many differences of opinion with Cornelis Hofstede de Groot. He was a regular contributor to the art history journal Oud Holland and compiled the Künstler-Inventare series.

In 1922, he left the Netherlands for health reasons and settled in Monaco, publishing books in 1927 on Jan Steen and, in 1935, a catalog of Rembrandt paintings, often referred to in the literature as "Bredius 1935". He bequeathed his papers to the Rijksbureau voor Kunsthistorische Documentatie, and his art collection lives on in the Museum Bredius. He also bequeathed several Rembrandt paintings to the National Dutch collection, including Rembrandt's Homer Dictating his Verses.

== Donation A. Bredius ==
In 1894 Bredius donated over 150 objects of his collection to the Rijksmuseum Amsterdam.

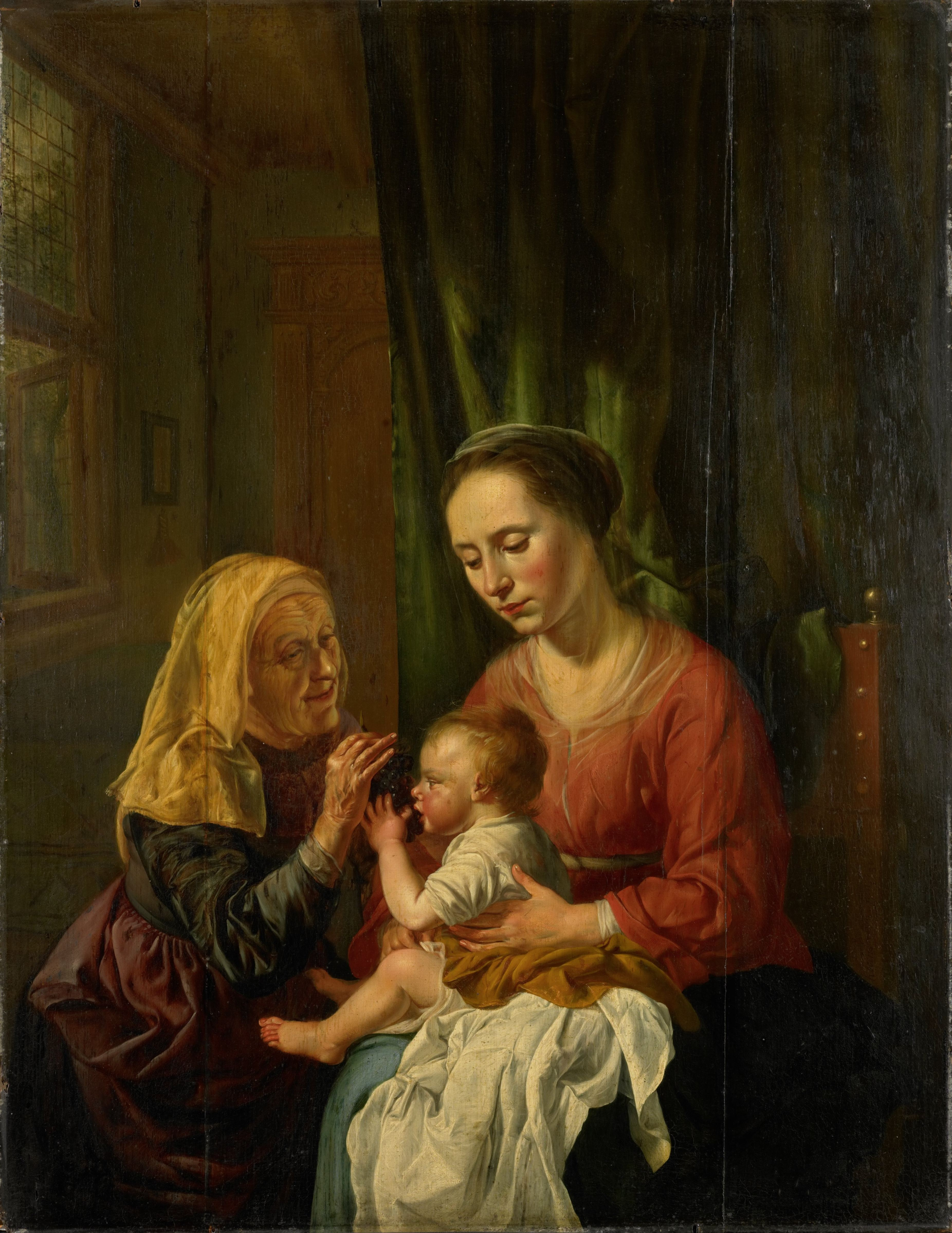
Madonna and Child, Dirk van Hoogstraten, 1630

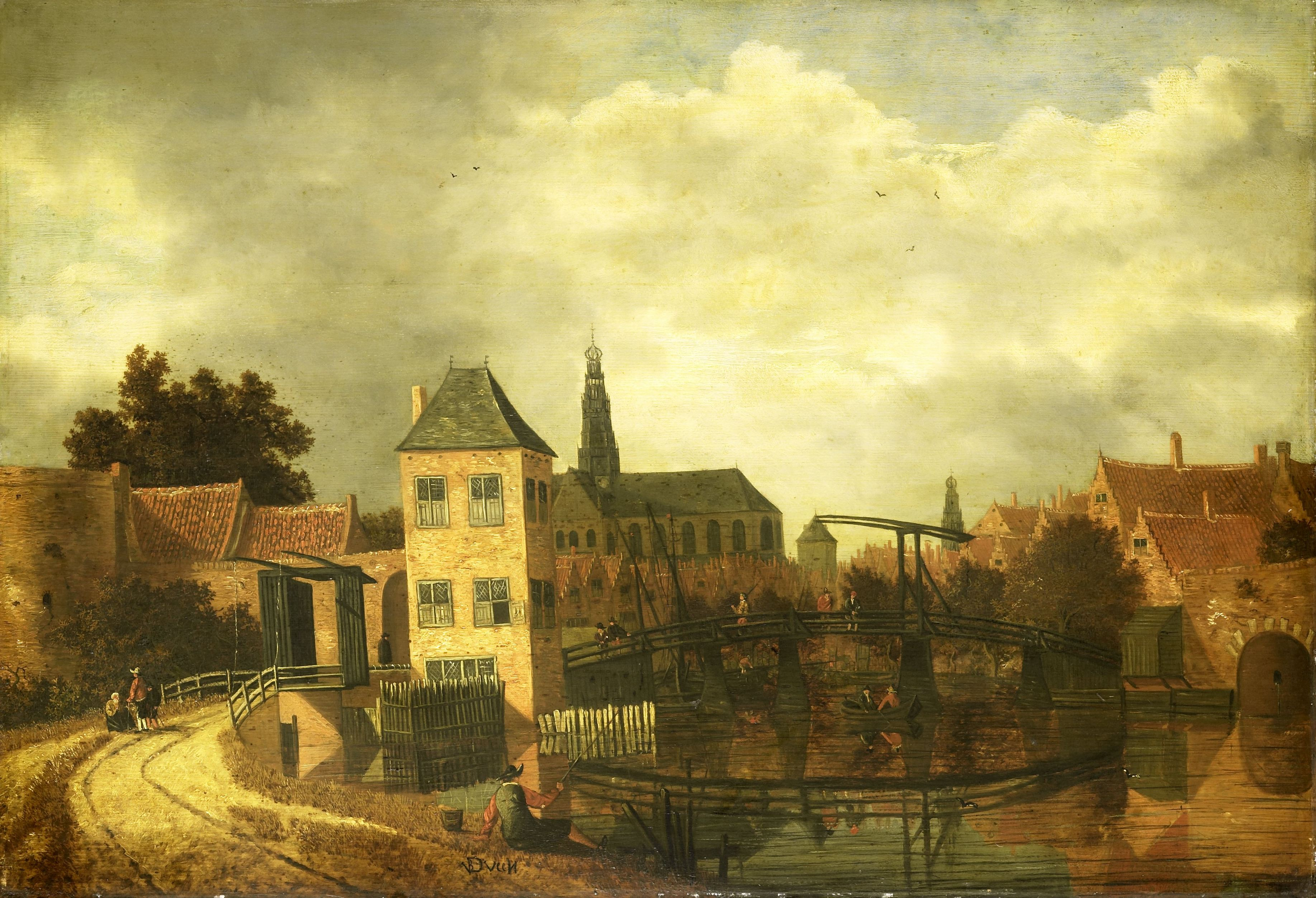
View of Haarlem, Balthasar van der Veen, 1650

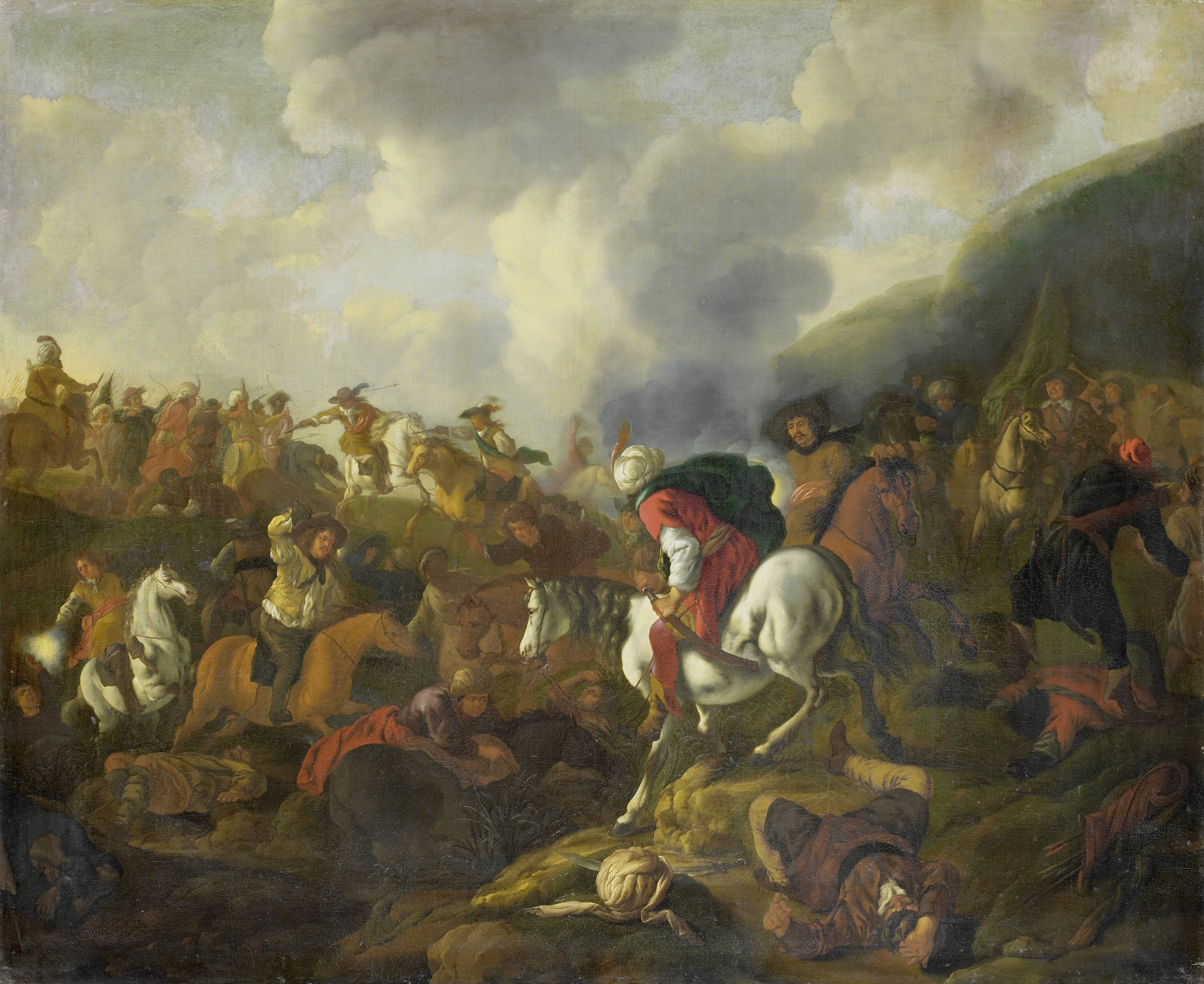
Equestrian Battle, Jacques Muller, 1670
