= Self-portraits by Rembrandt =

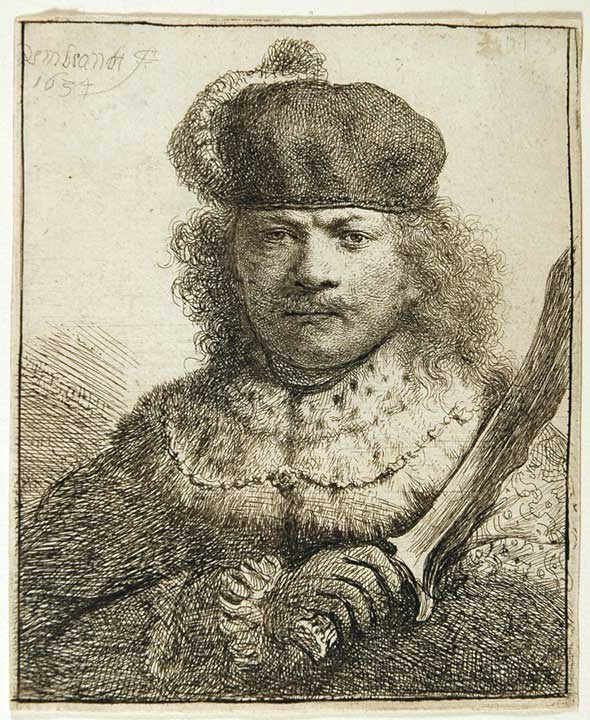
Role-playing in Self-portrait as an Oriental Potentate with a Kris, etching, 1634. B18

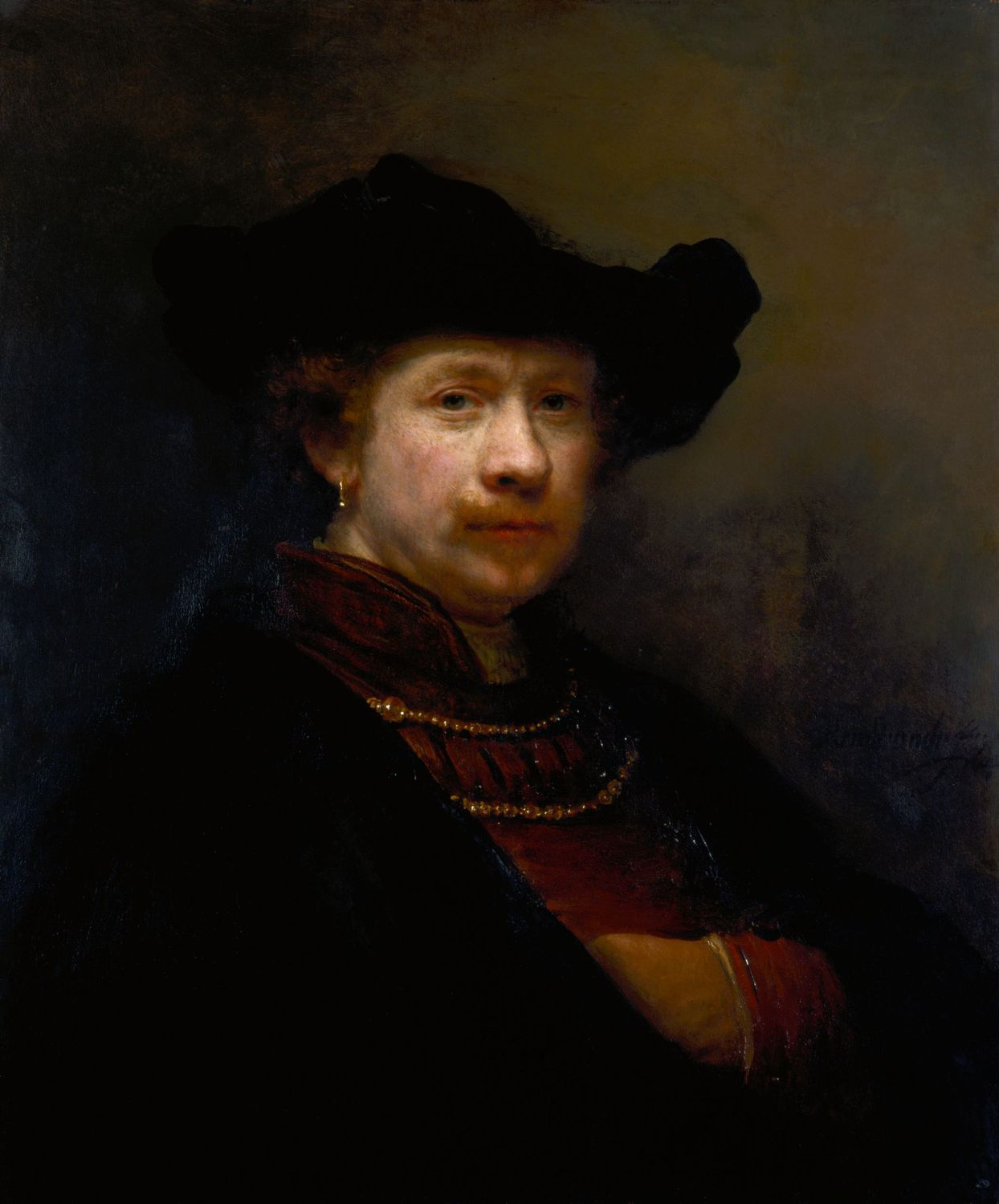
Royal Collection, 1642

The dozens of self-portraits by Rembrandt were an important part of his oeuvre. Rembrandt created approaching one hundred self-portraits including over forty paintings, thirty-one etchings and about seven drawings; some remain uncertain as to the identity of either the subject (mostly etchings) or the artist (mostly paintings), or the definition of a portrait.

This was an enormously high number for any artist up to that point, and around 10% of his oeuvre in both painting and etching. By comparison, the highly prolific Rubens only produced seven self-portrait paintings. The self-portraits create a visual diary of the artist over a span of forty years. They were produced throughout his career at a fairly steady pace, but there is a gradual shift between etchings, more numerous until the 1630s, to paintings, which are more common thereafter. However, there is a gap in paintings between 1645 and 1652. The last three etchings date to 1648, c. 1651, and 1658, whereas he was still painting portraits in 1669, the year he died at the age of 63.

At one time about ninety paintings were counted as Rembrandt self-portraits, but it is now known that he had his students copy his own self-portraits as part of their training. Modern scholarship, especially the Rembrandt Research Project, has reduced the autograph count to over forty paintings, as well as a few drawings and thirty-one etchings, which include many of the most remarkable images of the group. The etchings are mostly informal, often playful tronies, studies of extreme facial expressions or portraits in what amounts to fancy dress; in several the clothes are the fashions of a century or more earlier. In others he is pulling faces at himself. His oil paintings trace the progress from an uncertain young man, through the dapper and very successful portrait-painter of the 1630s, to the troubled but massively powerful portraits of his old age. Together they give a remarkably clear picture of the man, his appearance and his psychological make-up, as revealed by his richly weathered face. Kenneth Clark stated that Rembrandt is "with the possible exception of Van Gogh, the only artist who has made the self-portrait a major means of artistic self-expression, and he is absolutely the one who has turned self-portraiture into an autobiography."

While the popular interpretation is that these images represent a personal and introspective journey, it is also the case that they were painted to satisfy a market for self-portraits by prominent artists. Both paintings and etchings seem to have often been bought by collectors, and while some of the etchings are very rare, others were printed in considerable numbers for the time. No self-portraits were listed in the famous 1656 inventory, and only a handful of the paintings remained in the family after his death.

Rembrandt's self-portraits were created by the artist looking at himself in a mirror, and the paintings and drawings therefore reverse his actual features. In the etchings the printing process creates a reversed image, and the prints therefore show Rembrandt in the same orientation as he appeared to contemporaries. This is one reason why the hands are usually omitted or "just cursorily described" in the paintings; they would be on the "wrong" side if painted from the mirror. References to large mirrors occur at various points from the 1650s, and the later portraits include several showing him at a longer length than before; about 80 cm was the maximum height for a sheet of mirror glass technically possible in Rembrandt's lifetime. One may have been bought about 1652 and then sold in 1656 when he went bankrupt. In 1658 he asked his son Titus to arrange delivery of another one, which broke en route to his house.

== Paintings ==
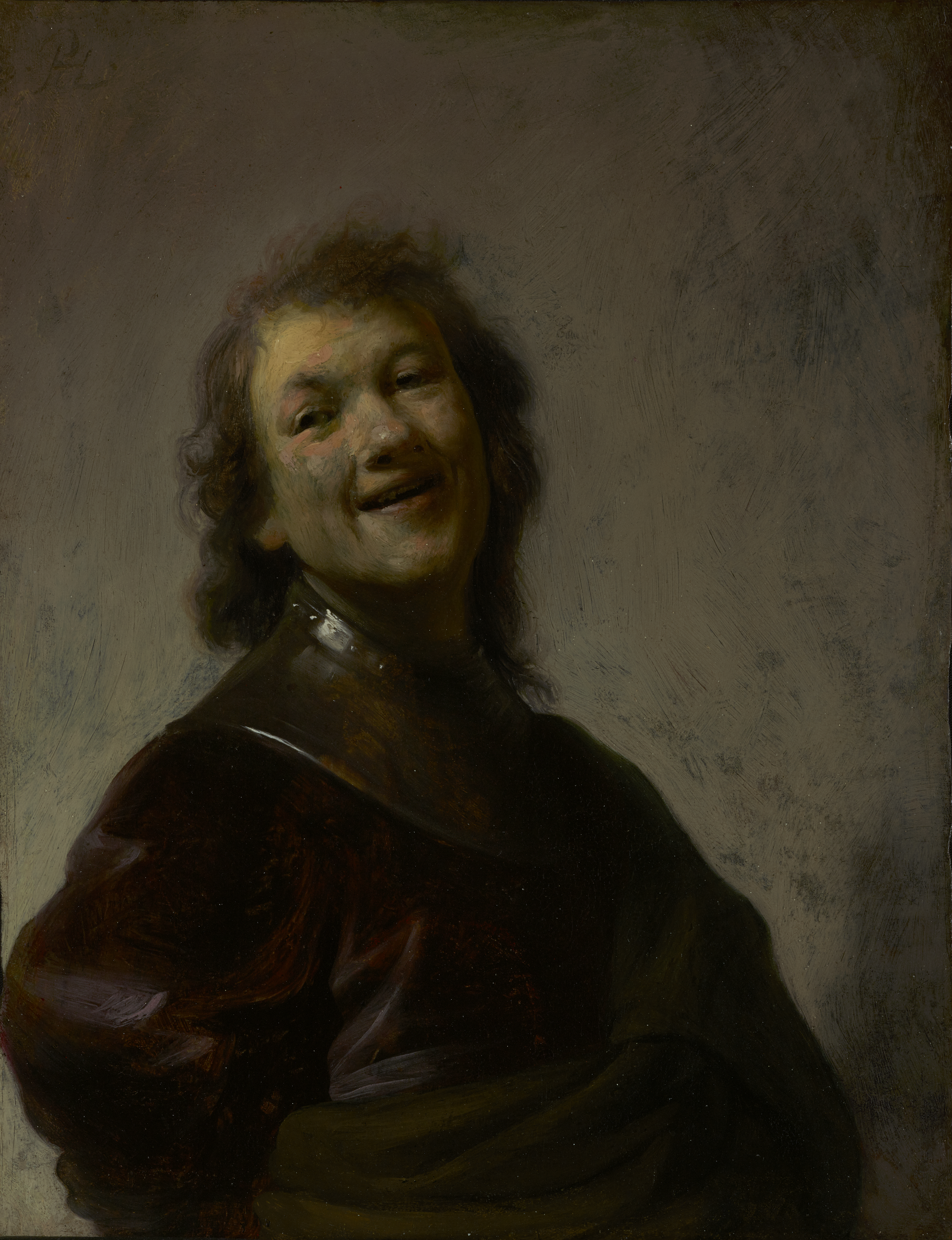
A more cheerful pose painted on copper. Rembrandt Laughing, c. 1628, re-discovered in 2008, J. Paul Getty Museum, Los Angeles

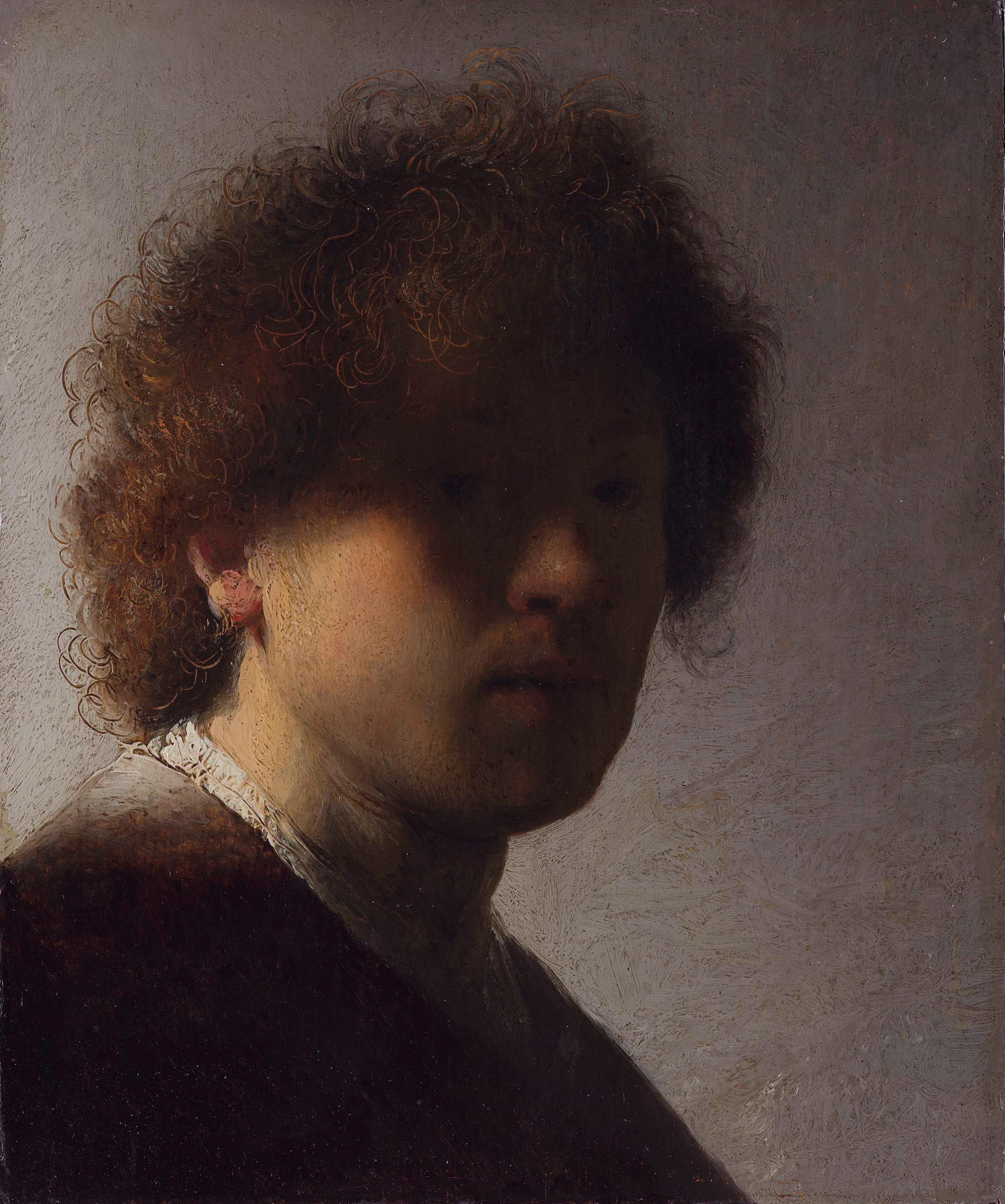
A young Rembrandt (c. 1628) when he was 22. Partly an exercise in chiaroscuro. Rijksmuseum, Amsterdam.

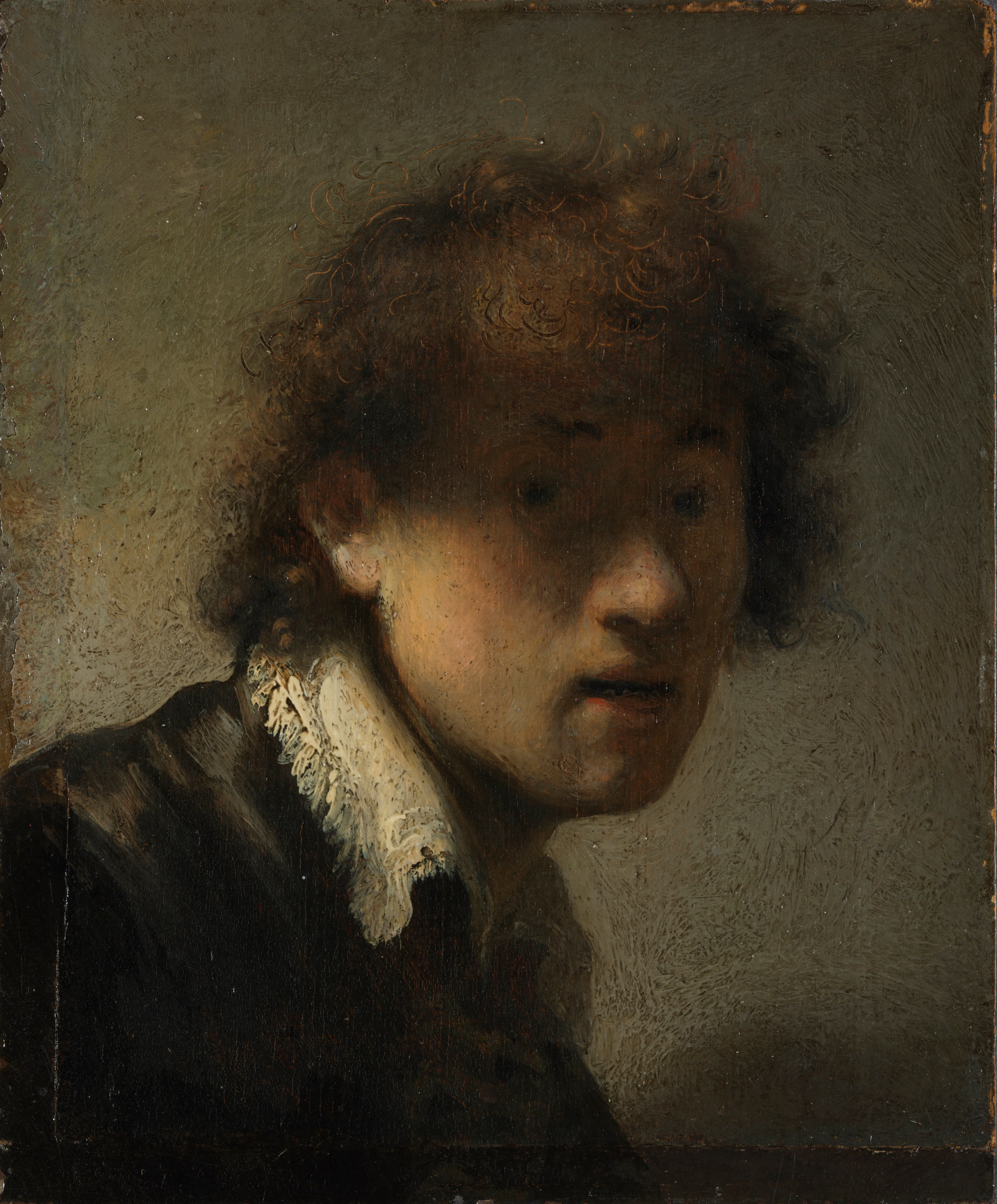
1629. Alte Pinakothek, Munich.

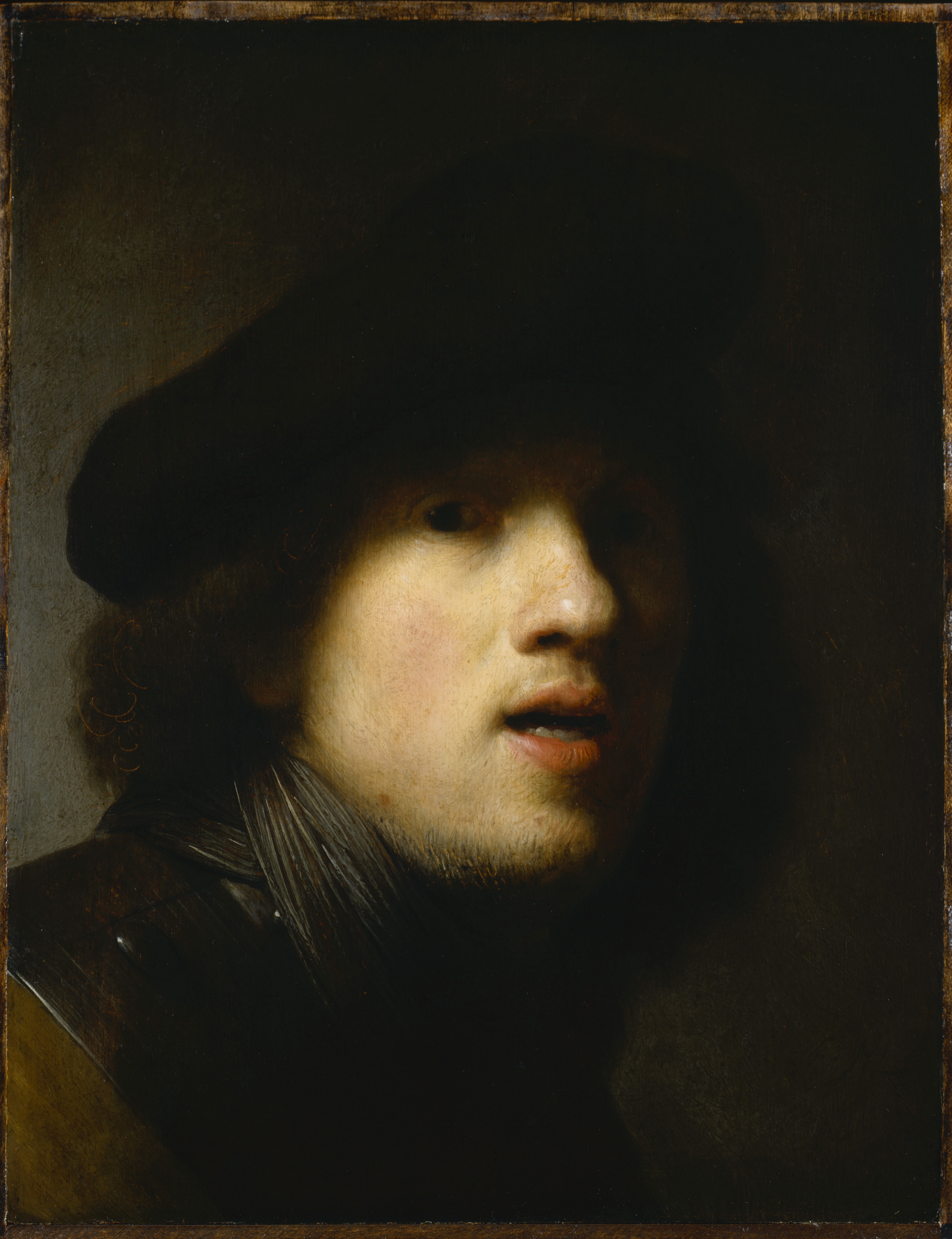
c. 1629. Self-portrait (Indianapolis). Clowes Fund Collection, Indianapolis Museum of Art.

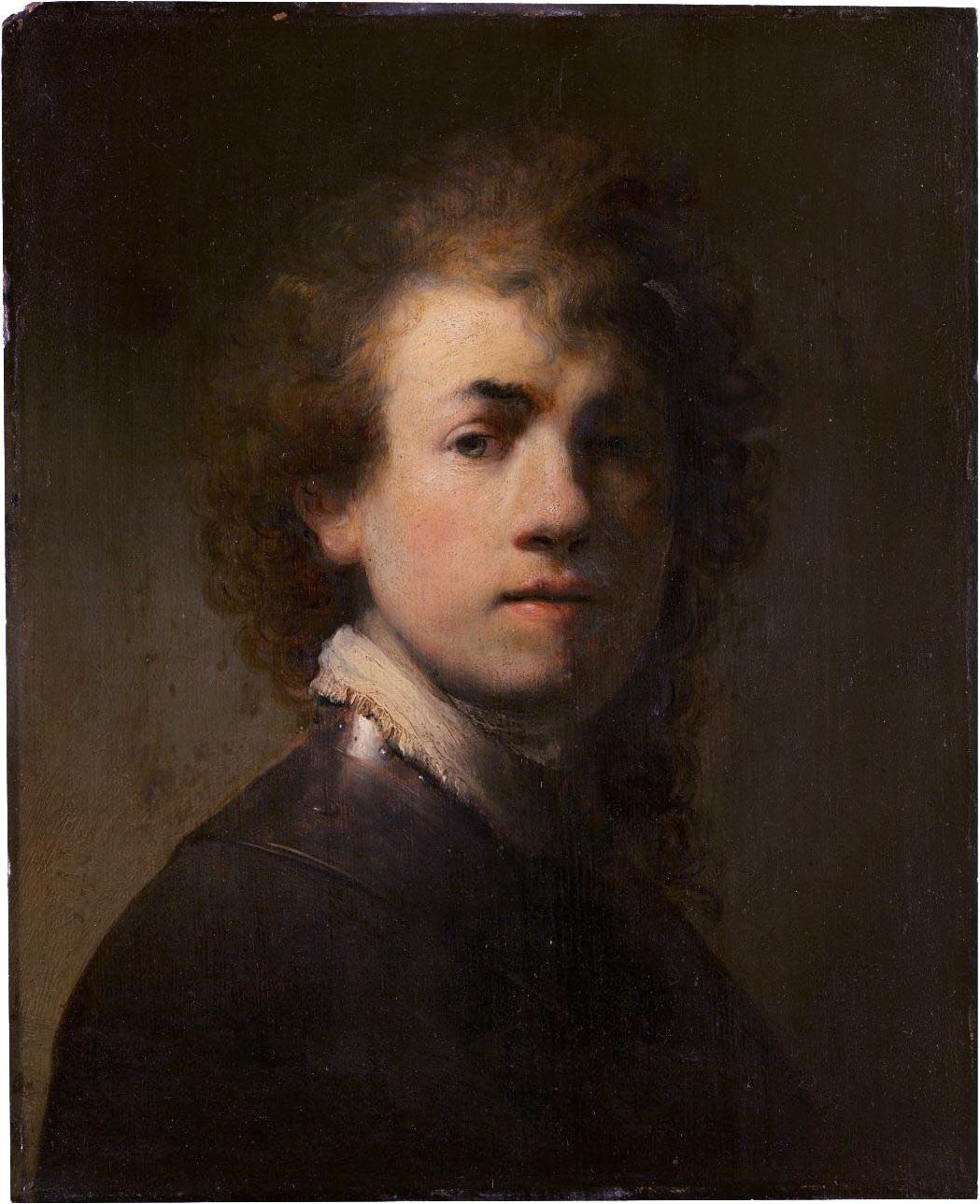
Self-Portrait in a Gorget, c. 1629, oil on panel. Germanisches Nationalmuseum, Nuremberg.

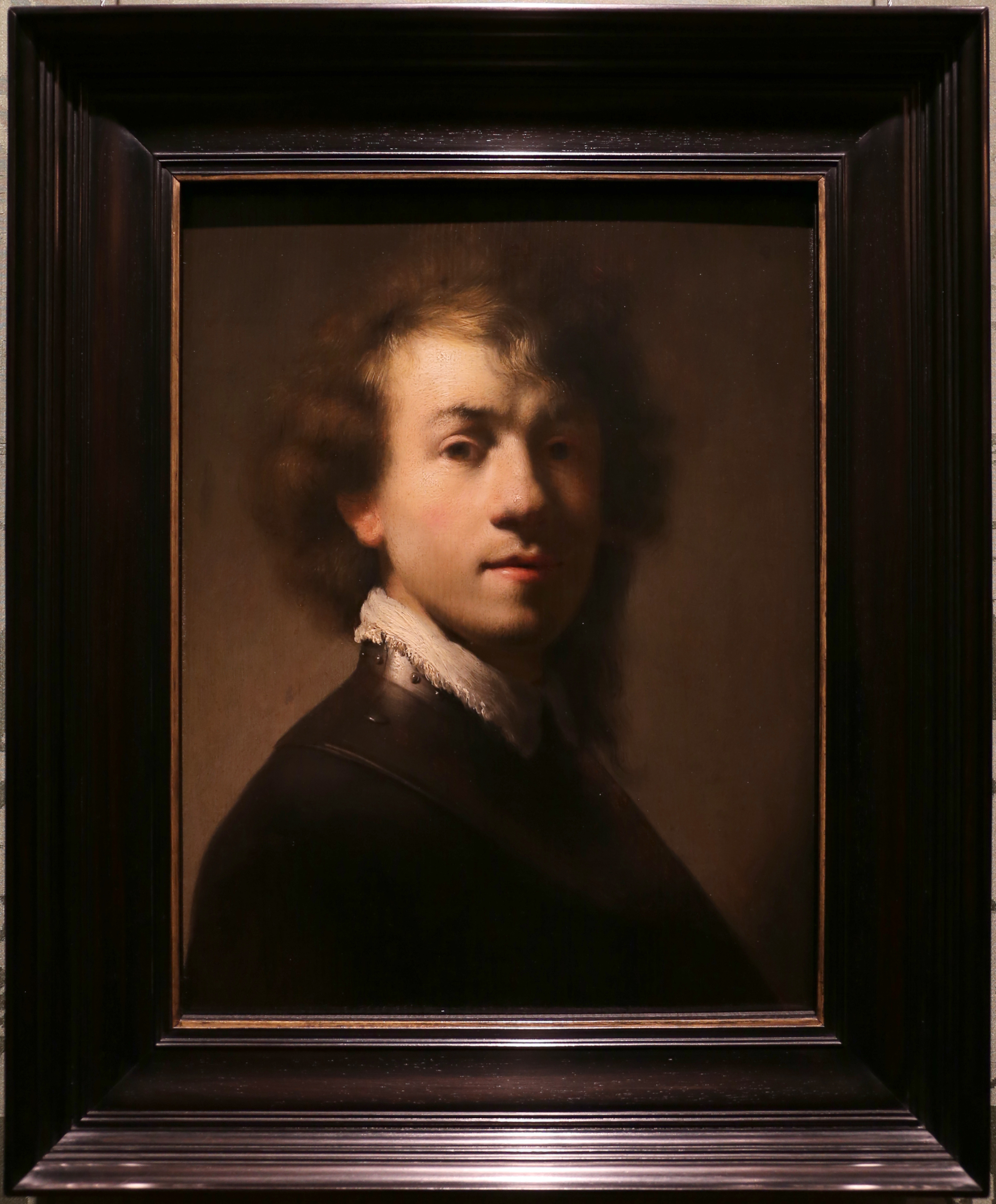
Self-Portrait with Lace Collar c. 1629. Mauritshuis, The Hague.

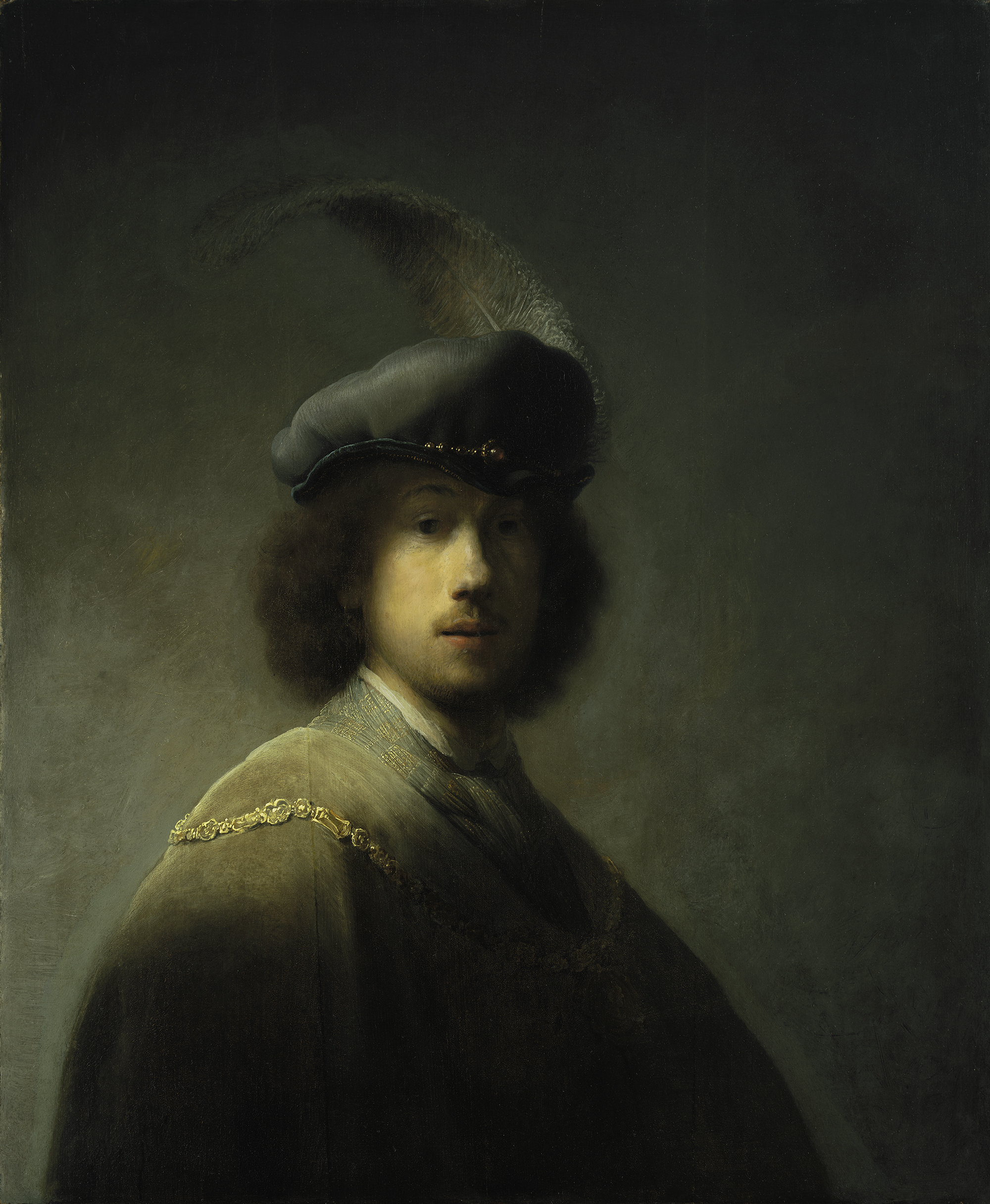
Self-Portrait, Age 23 (1629). Isabella Stewart Gardner Museum, Boston. Bernard Berenson called it "one of the most precious pictures in existence".

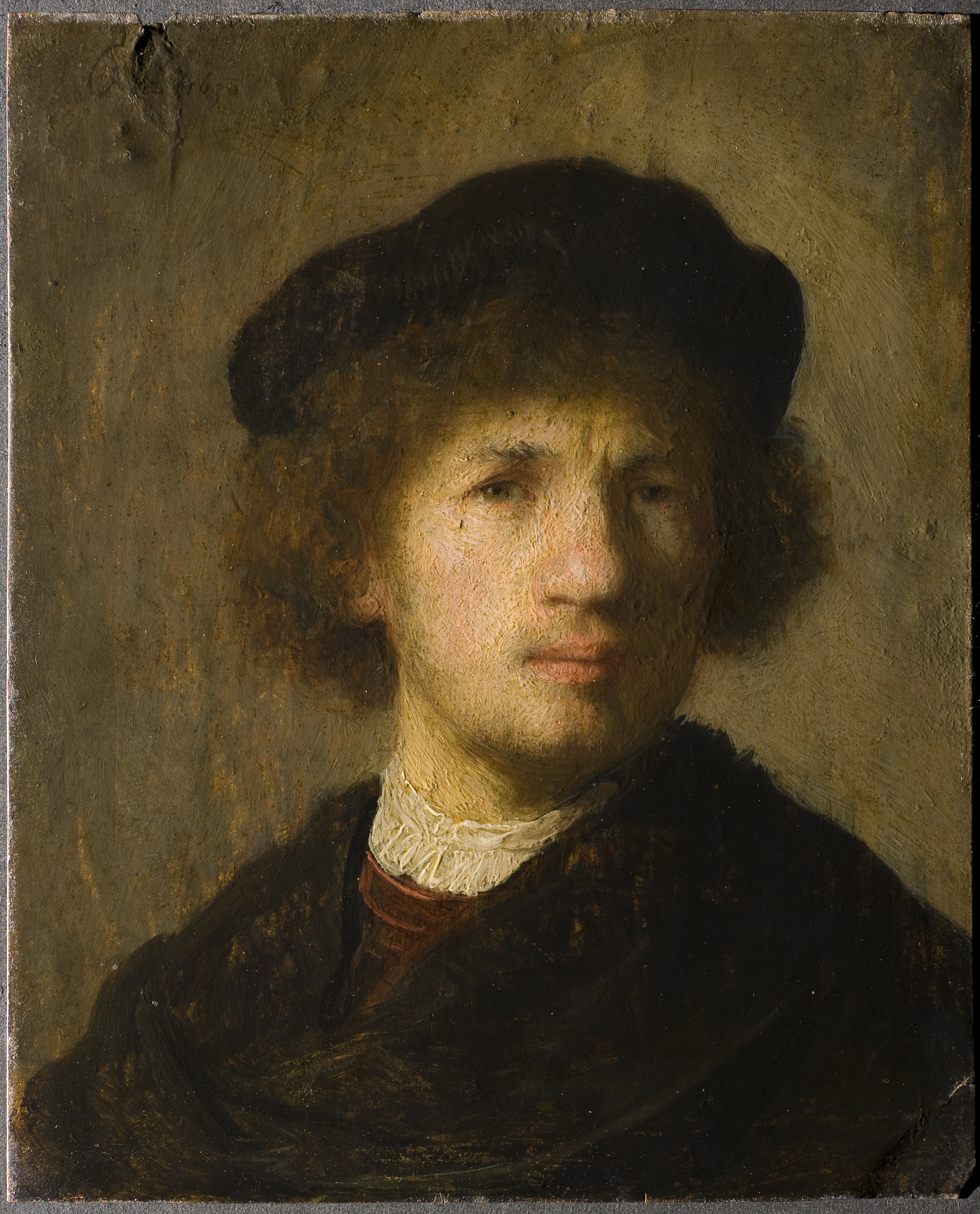
Small self-portrait on copper with beret and gathered shirt (‘stilus mediocris’) by Rembrandt, 1630. Nationalmuseum, Stockholm.

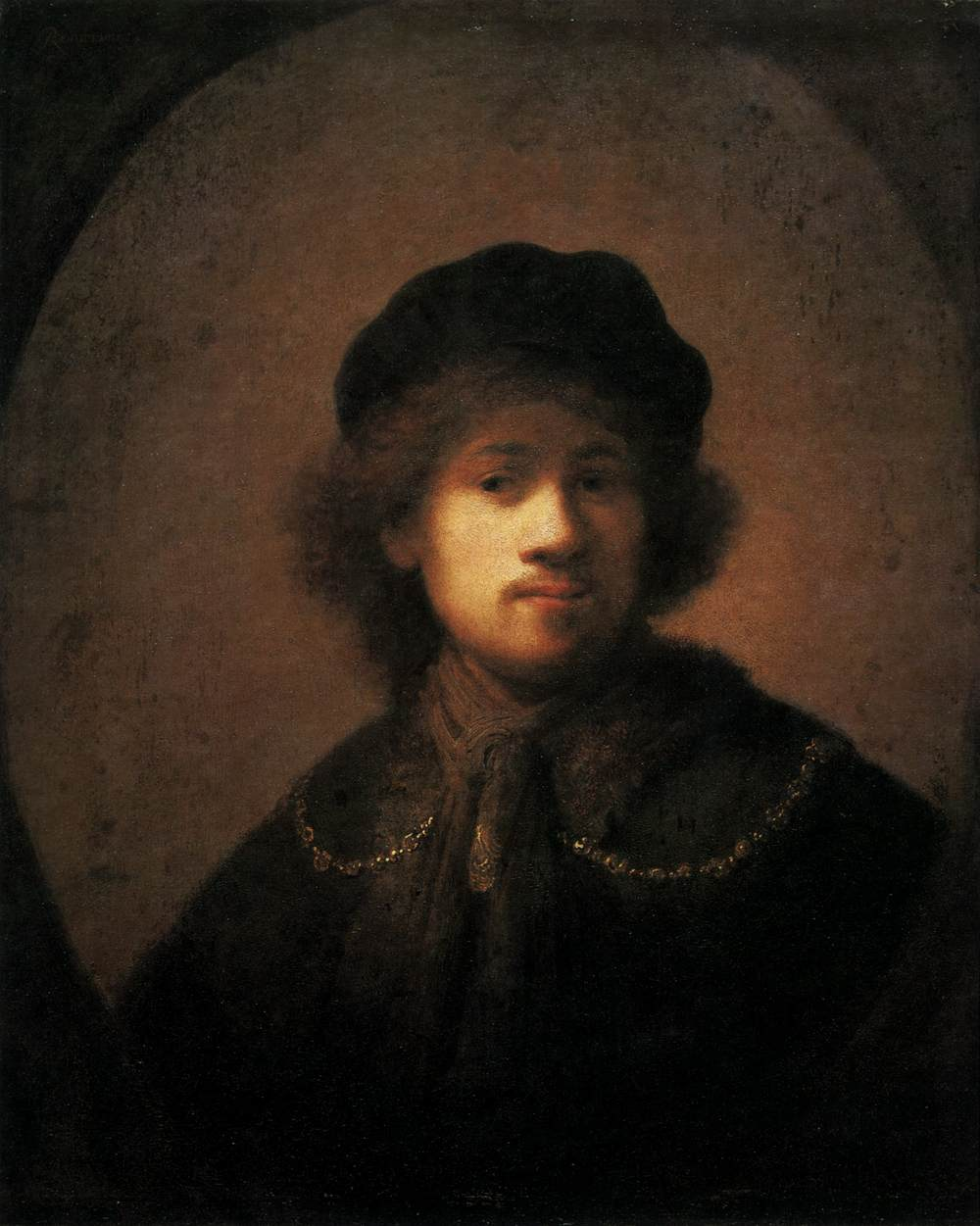
Self-Portrait, c. 1630. Walker Art Gallery, Liverpool. The Liverpool Self-Portrait is transitional between a study of expression, a tronie and a conventional head-and-shoulders 'portrait of the artist'.

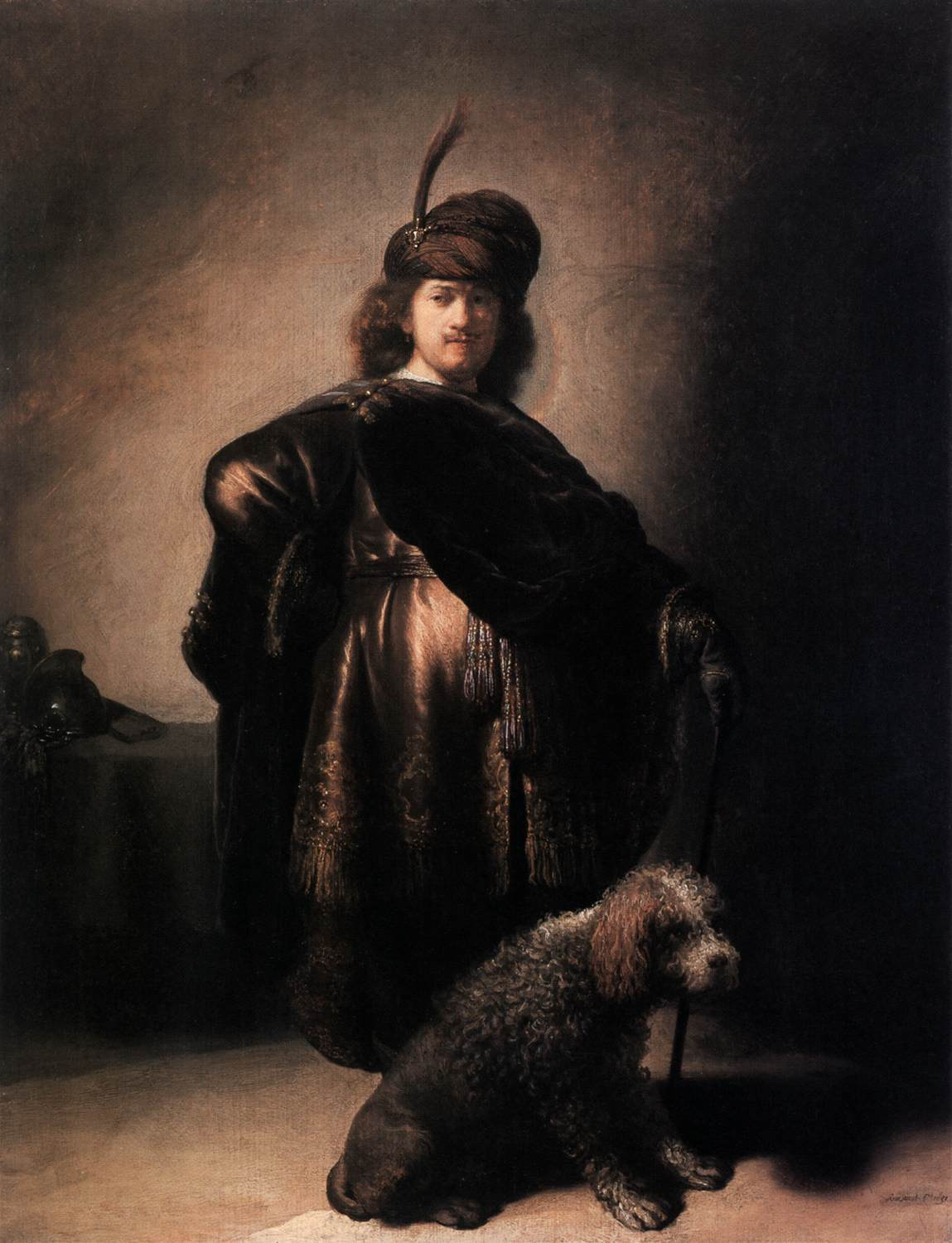
Self-Portrait in Oriental Costume with Poodle, 1631-1633. Last self-portrait produced in his hometown and only full-length self-portrait. Exotic dress and spacious setting indicate a Portrait historié. Musée des Beaux-Arts de la ville de Paris, Petit Palais, Paris.

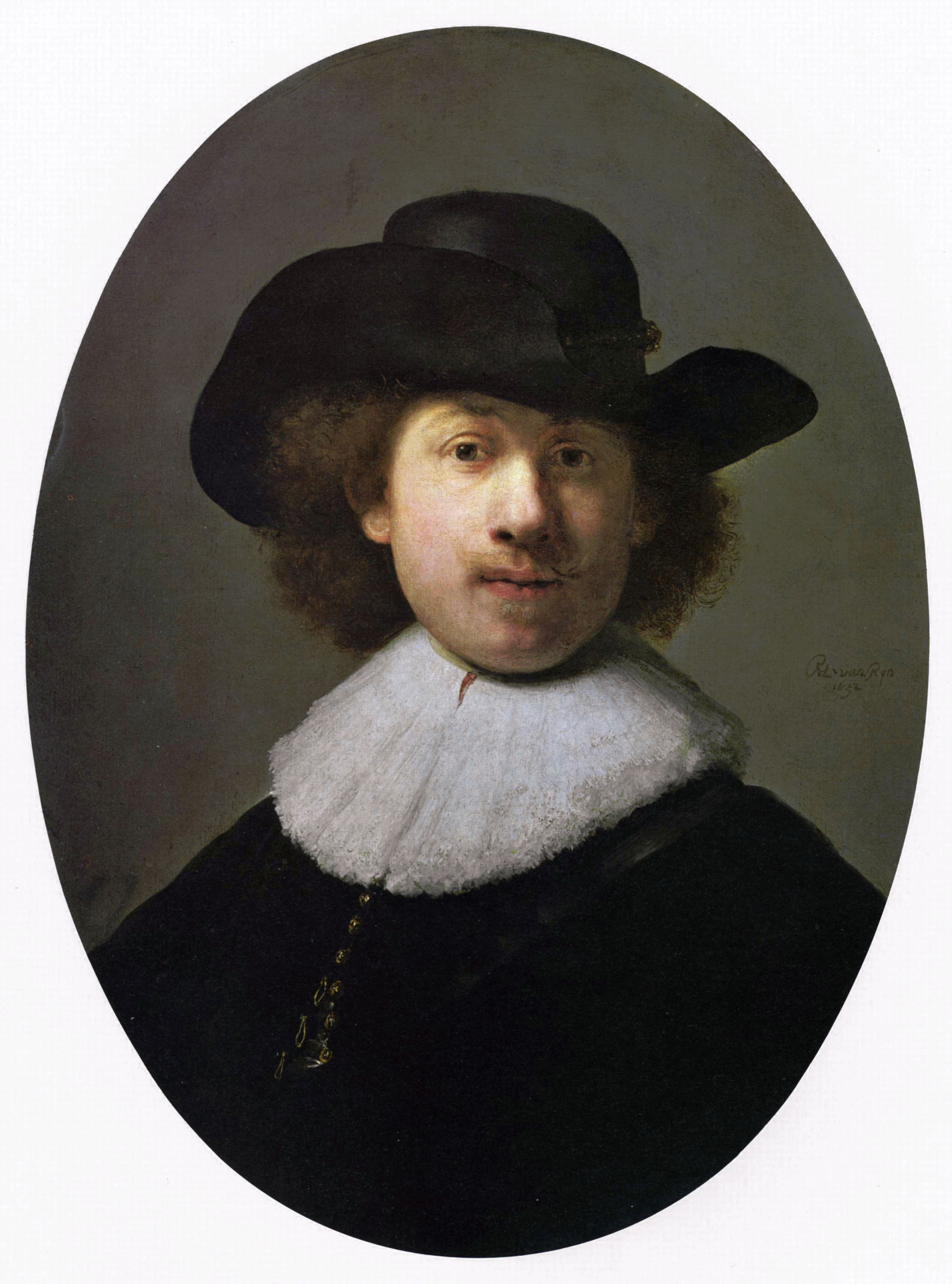
Rembrandt in 1632, when he was enjoying great success as a fashionable portraitist in this style. Burrell Collection, Glasgow.

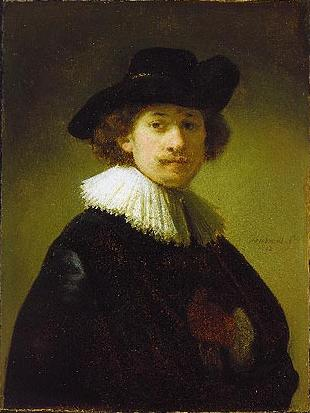
Self-portrait with hat, 1632, sold in 2020. Private Collection.

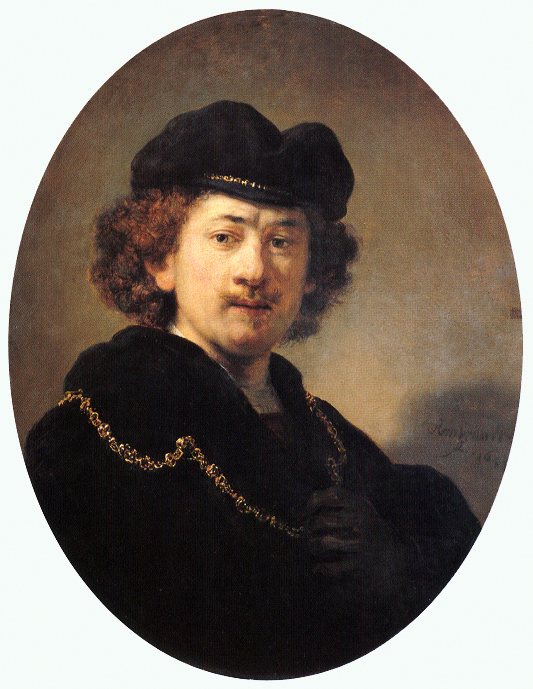
Self-portrait Wearing a Toque and a Gold Chain, 1633. Louvre Museum, Paris.

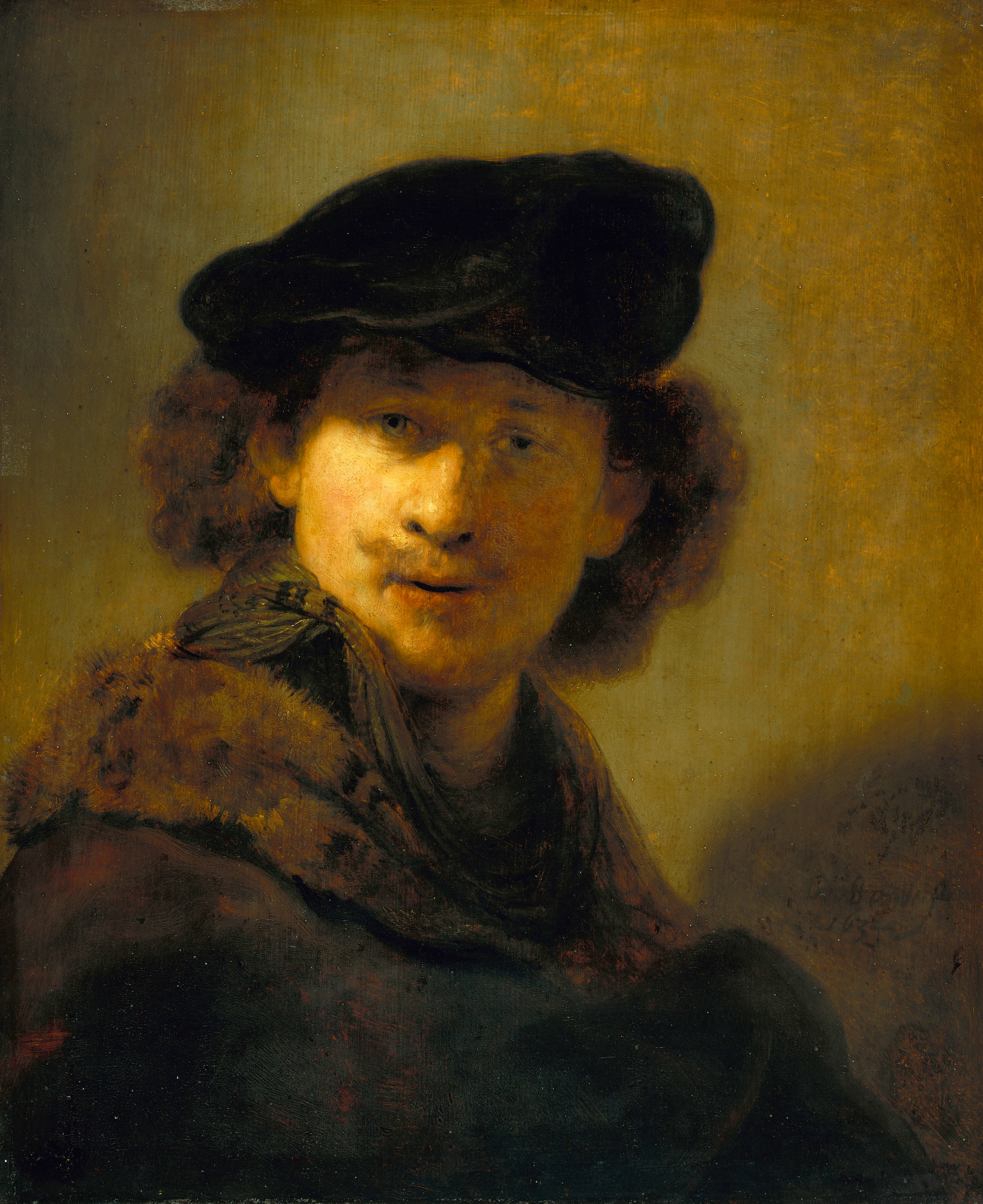
Self-Portrait with Velvet Beret and Furred Mantle, 1634. Gemäldegalerie Berlin.

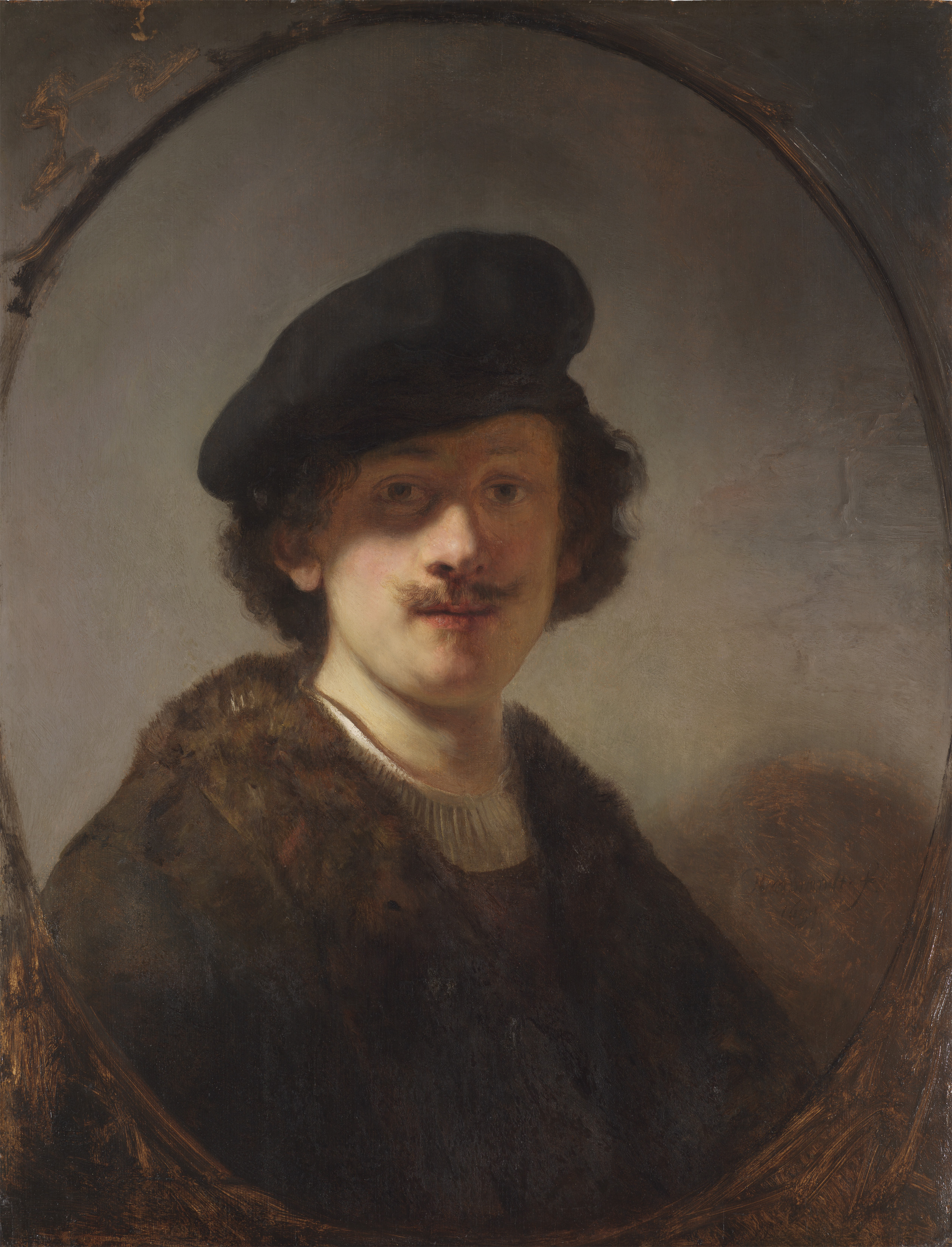
Self-portrait with Shaded Eyes, 1634. Private collection.

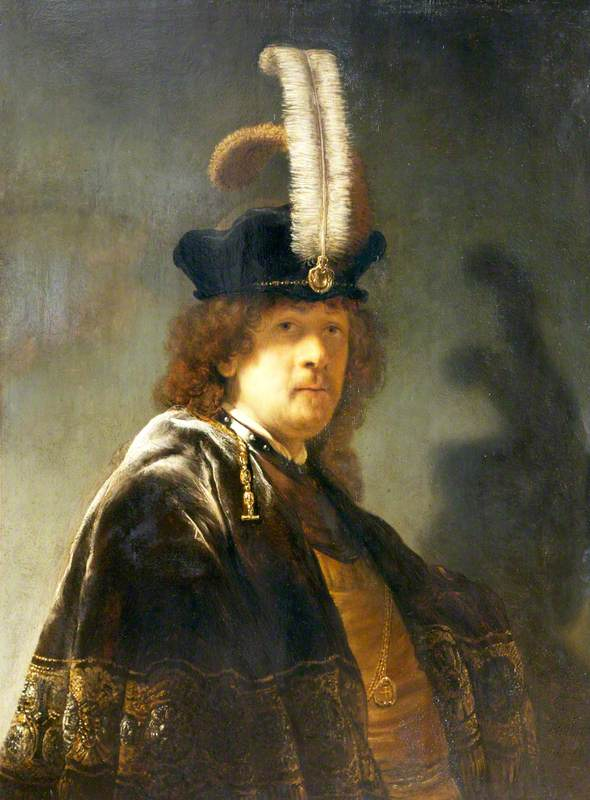
Self-portrait wearing a white feathered bonnet, 1635, Buckland Abbey, Devon. A traditional attribution, that was rejected in 1968, then returned in 2013.

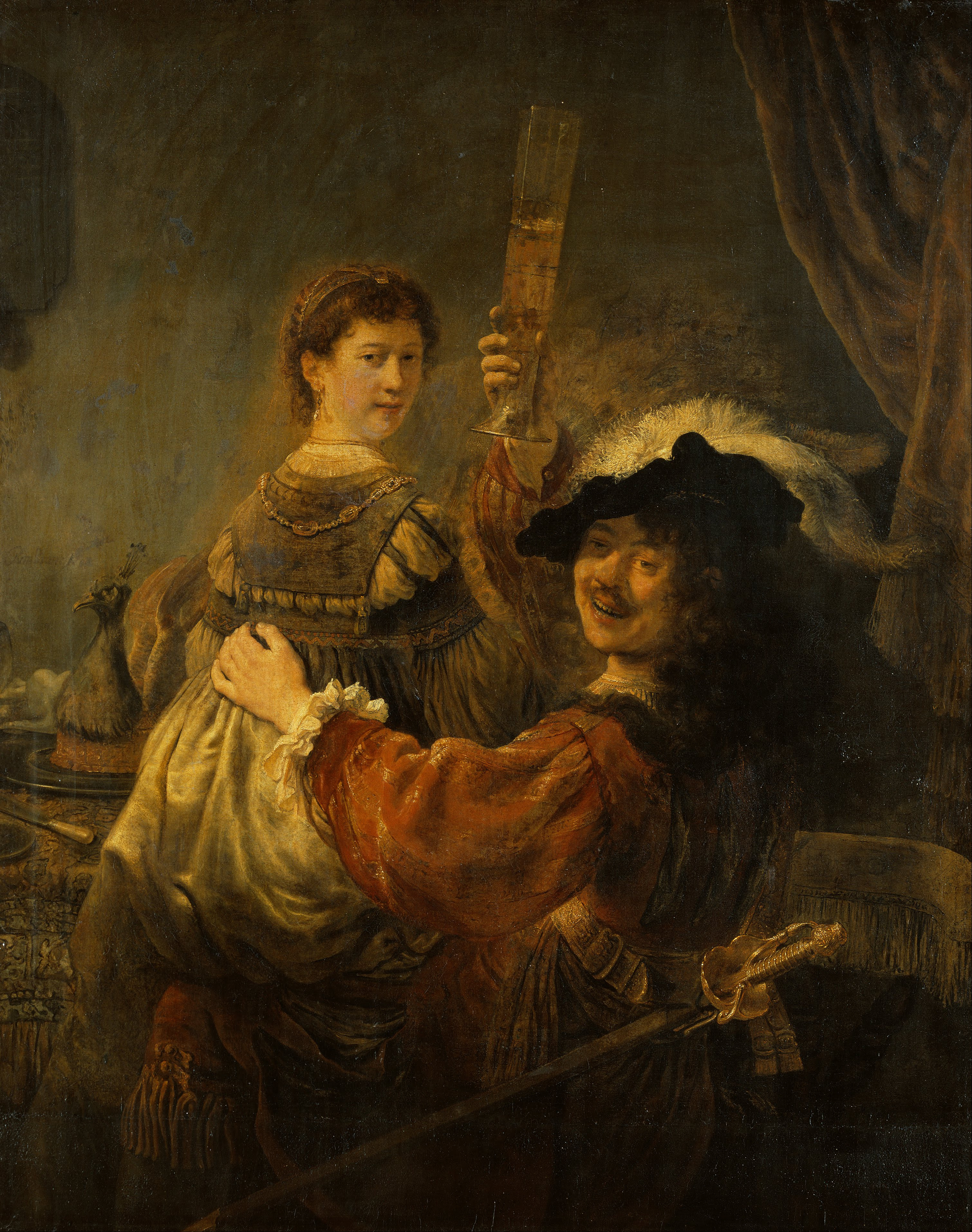
"Self-Portrait" as the Prodigal Son, with Saskia, c. 1635, Gemäldegalerie Alte Meister, Dresden. That his wife Saskia was used as the model is very likely; the identification of the man is less certain.

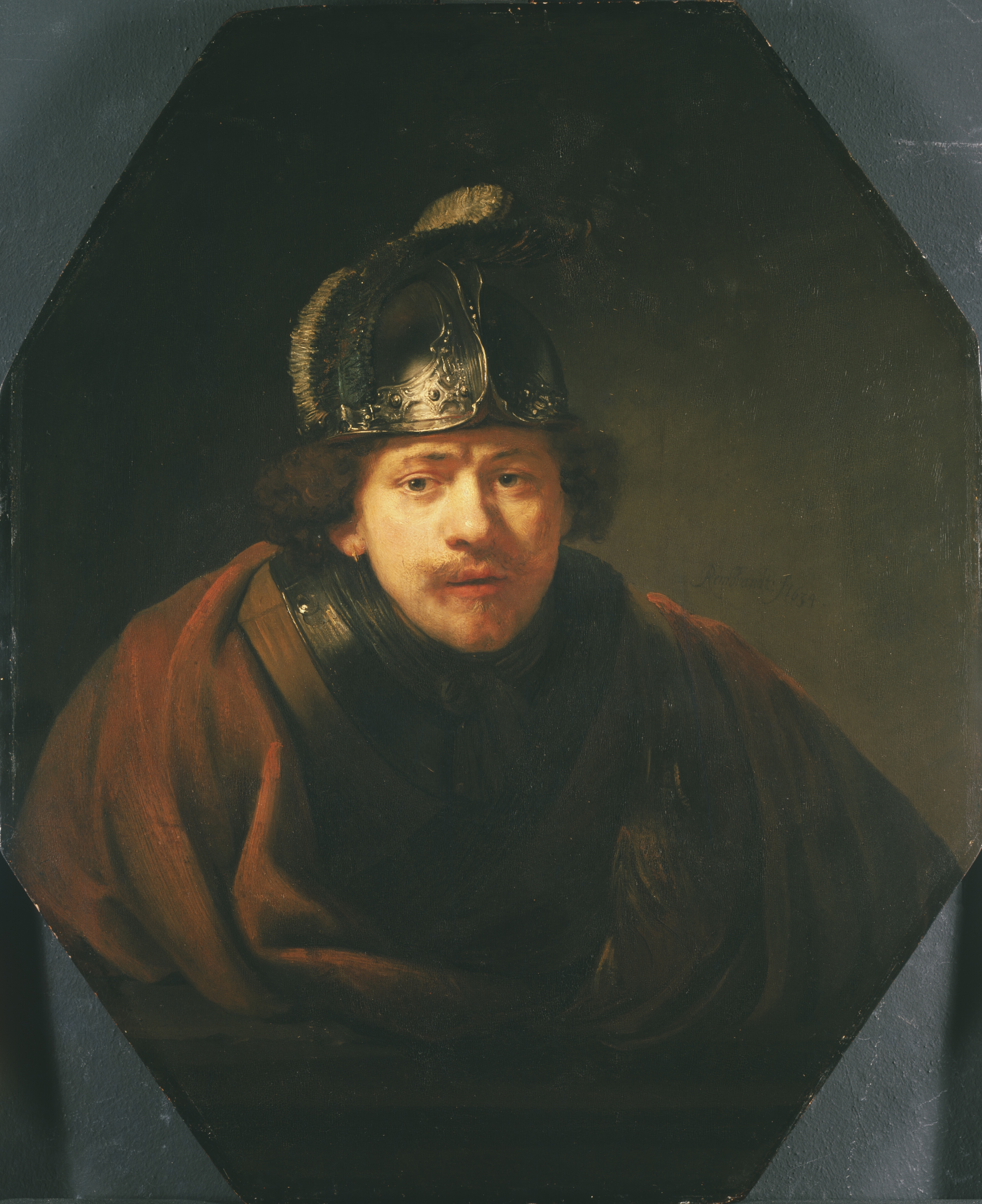
Portrait of Rembrandt with Gorget and Helmet, 1634. Staatliche Museen, Kassel. Debated authorship.

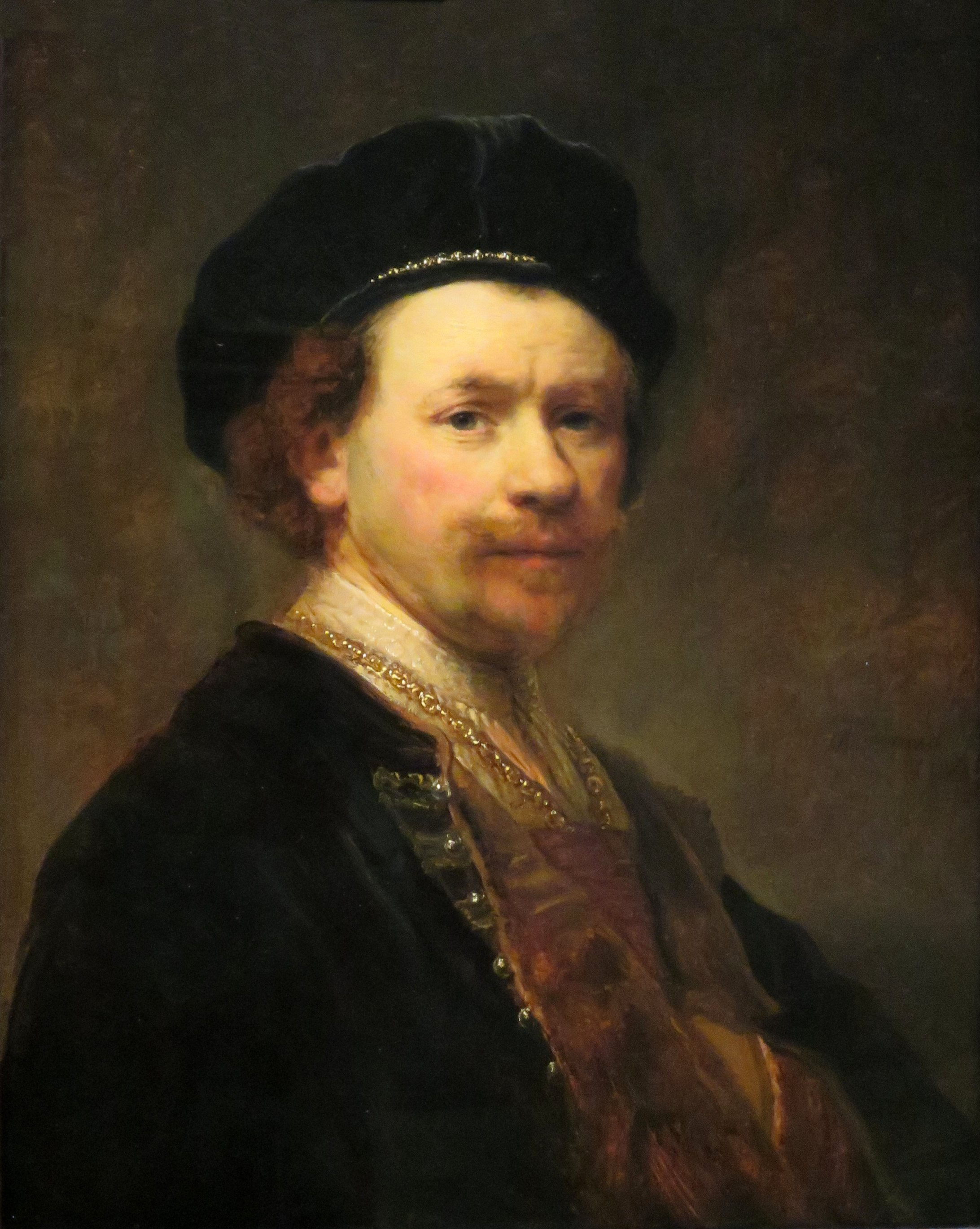
c. 1636—38, Norton Simon Museum, Pasadena. The authenticity of this work has been questioned; Carel Fabritius has been proposed.

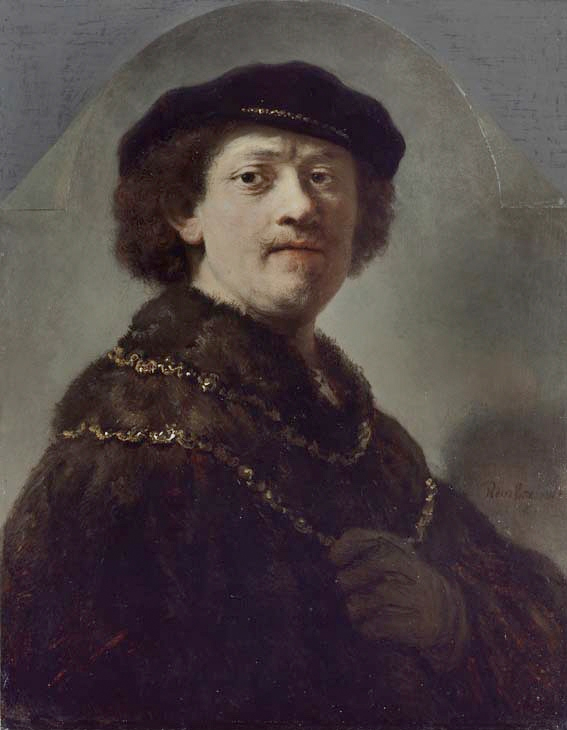
Self-Portrait in a Black Cap, c. 1637. Wallace Collection, London

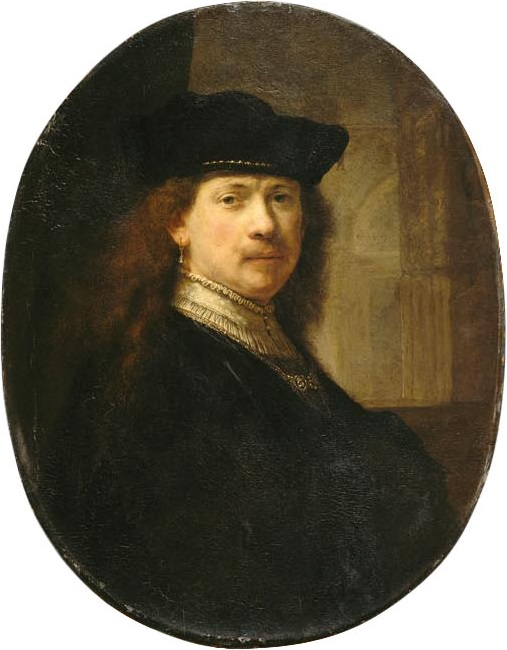
Painted over a biblical scene, only the head and collar are by Rembrandt, Perhaps 1639. Louvre Paris.

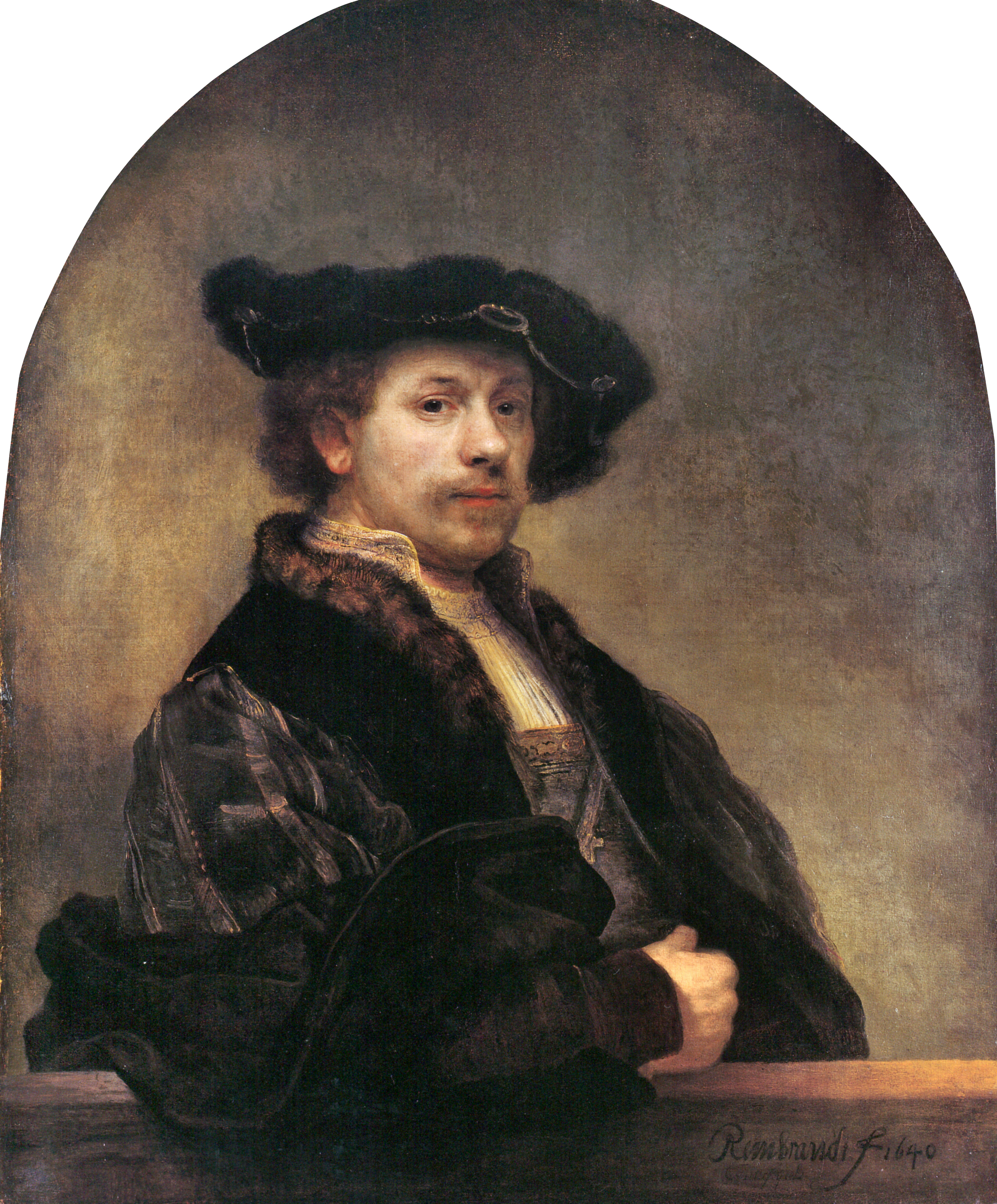
Self-portrait, 1640, wearing a costume in the style of over a century earlier. The pose relates to his etching of 1639 (below) and the Titian portrait A Man with a Quilted Sleeve. National Gallery, London

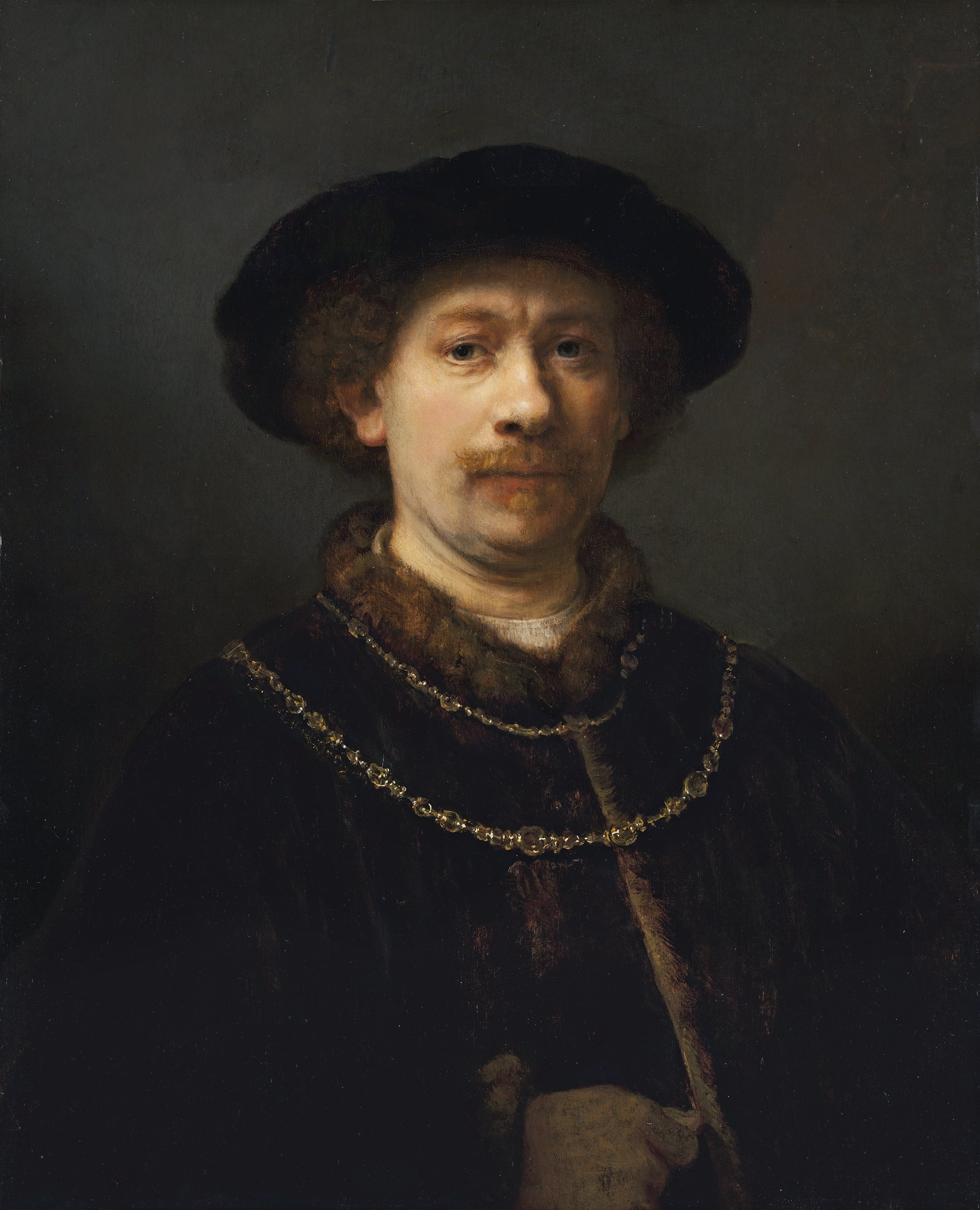
Self-portrait wearing a hat and two Chains, c. 1642—1643, Thyssen-Bornemisza Museum, Madrid.

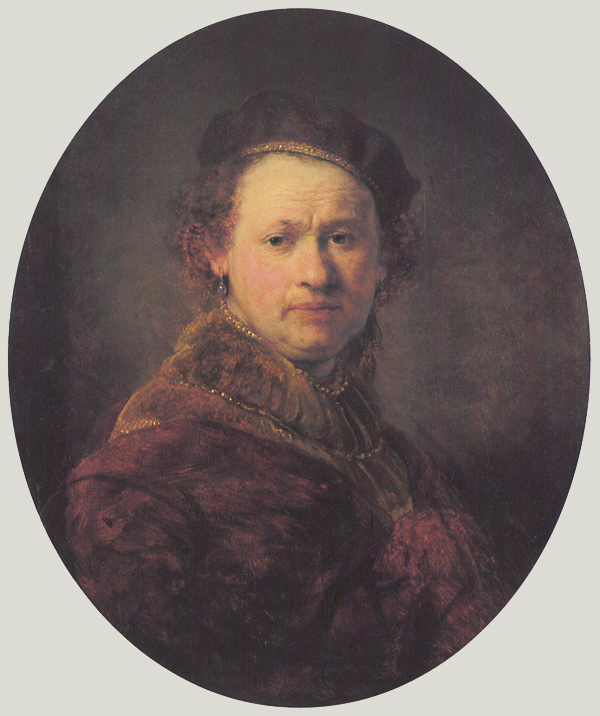
1645, Staatliche Kunsthalle Karlsruhe The last painted self-portrait until 1652.

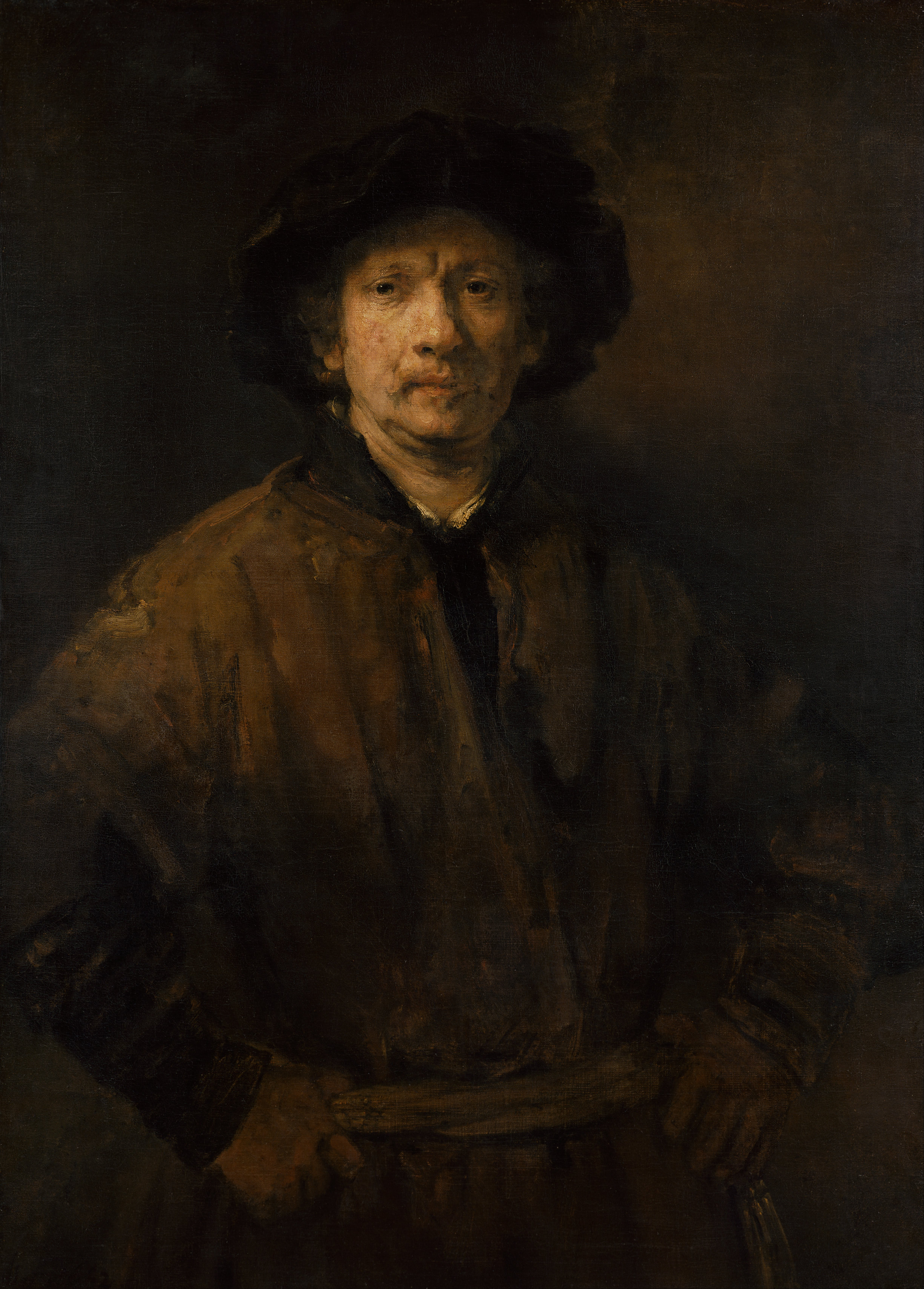
Self Portrait, oil on canvas, 1652. Kunsthistorisches Museum, Vienna. The first for several years. As in the drawing of the same year, Rembrandt wears his working clothes, except perhaps for his hat, which draws on historical styles and earlier portraits.

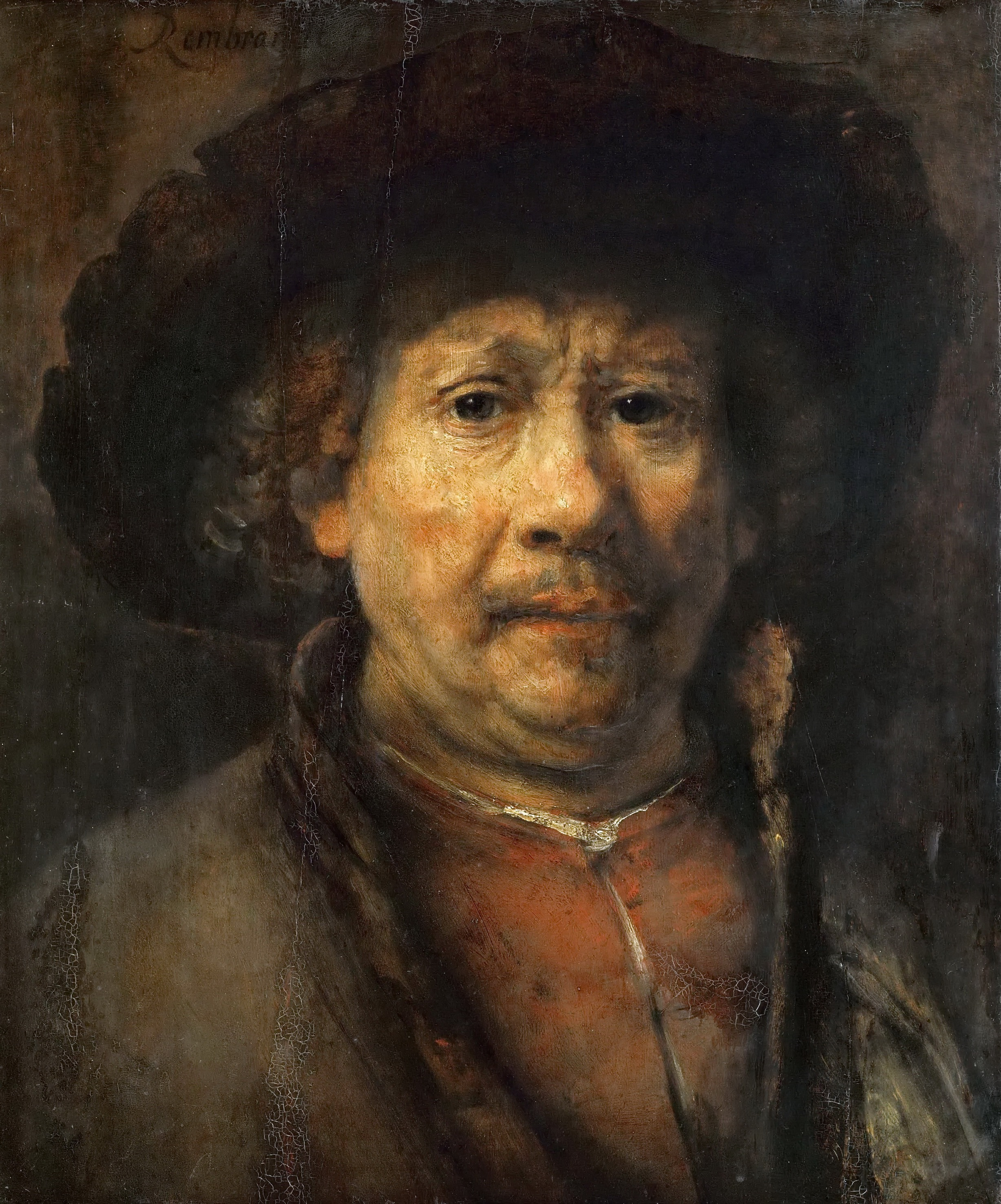
KHM Vienna, c. 1655, oil on walnut, cut down in size. Debated authorship.

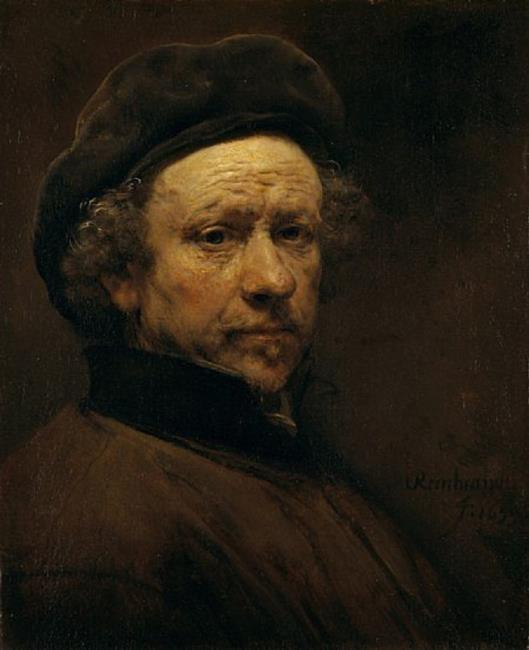
1659?, on loan to the National Gallery of Scotland, Edinburgh.

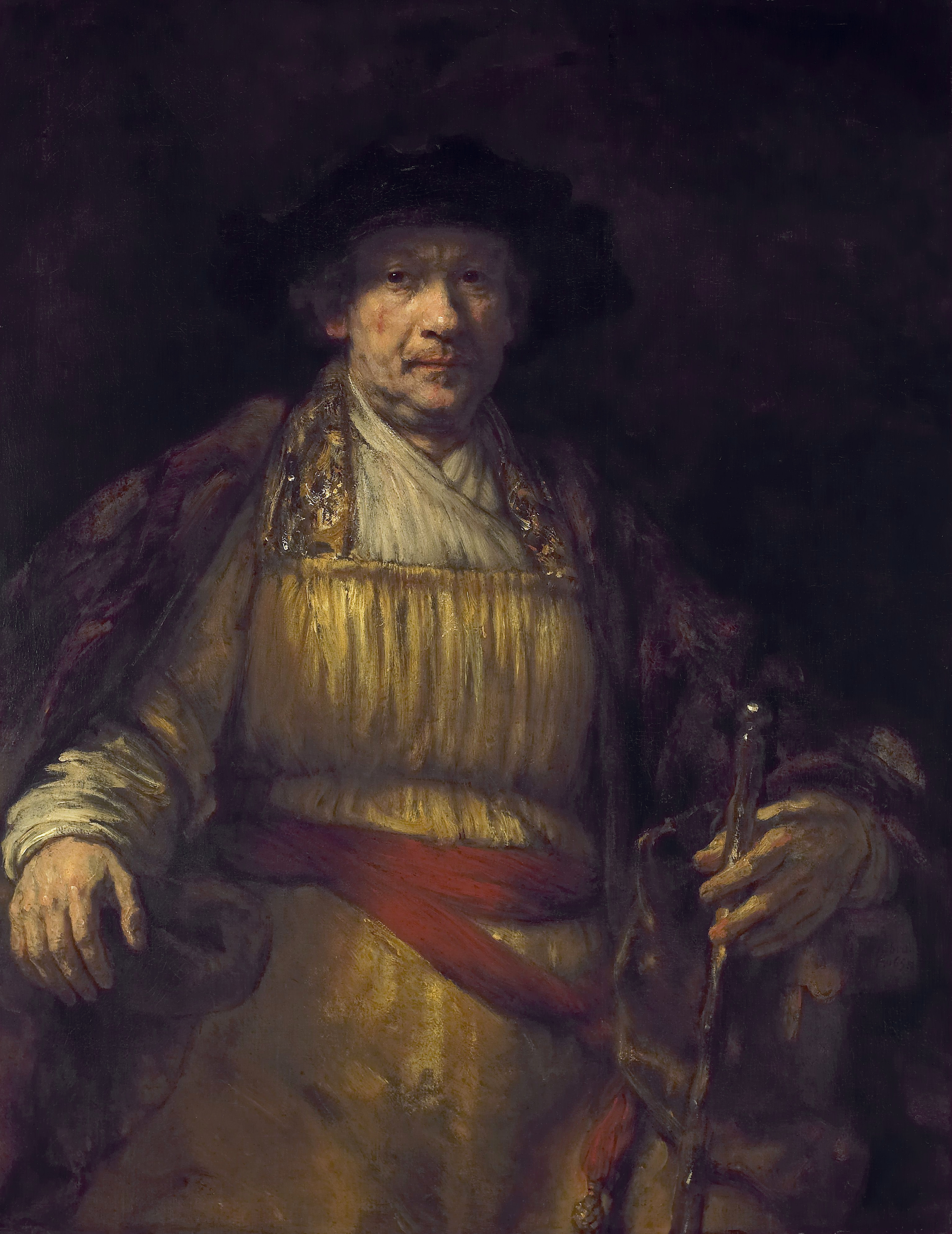
Self-Portrait, 1658, Frick Collection, New York

Self-Portrait with Beret and Turned-Up Collar, 1659. National Gallery of Art, Washington, D.C.

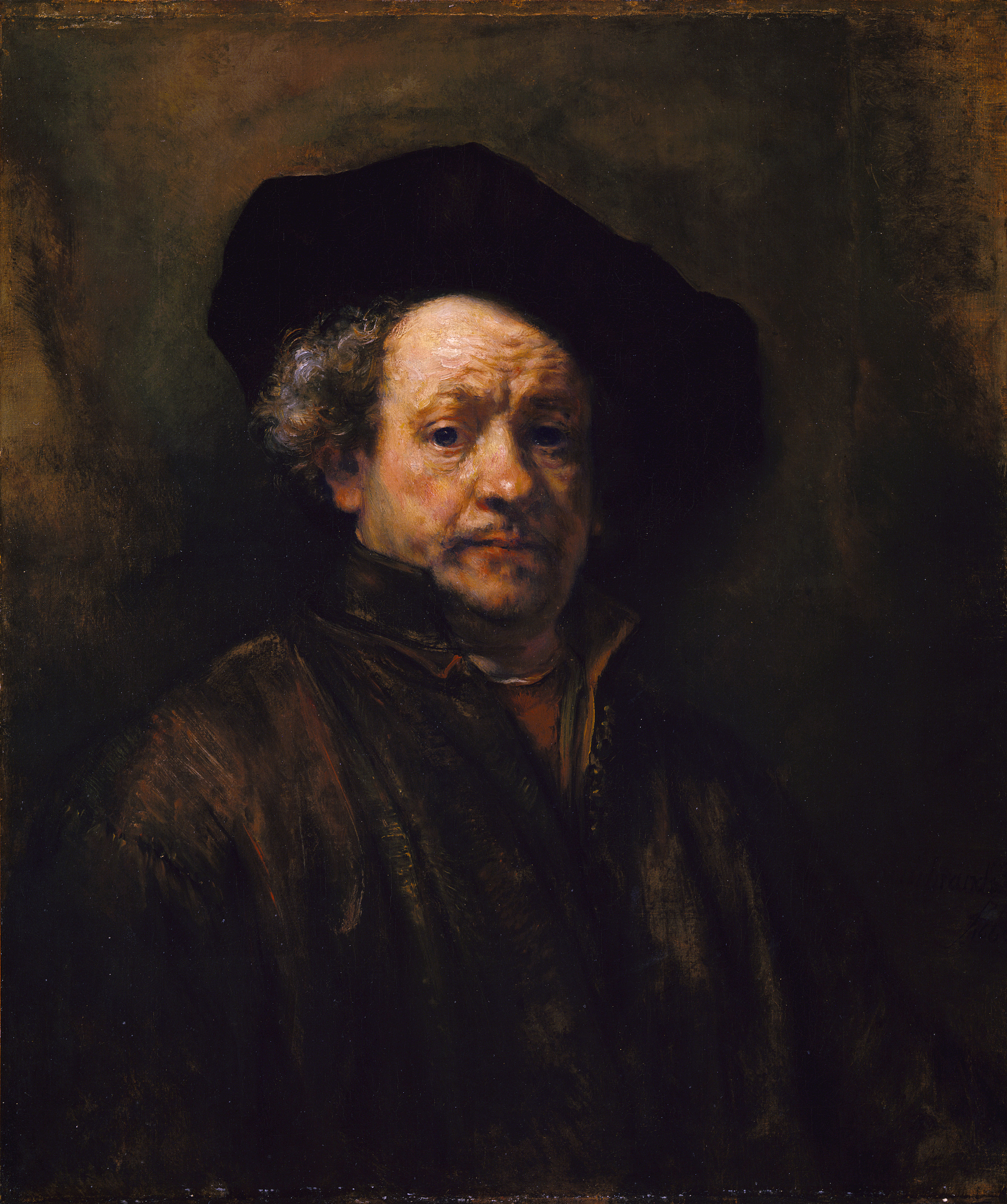
Self Portrait, 1660. Metropolitan Museum of Art, New York City

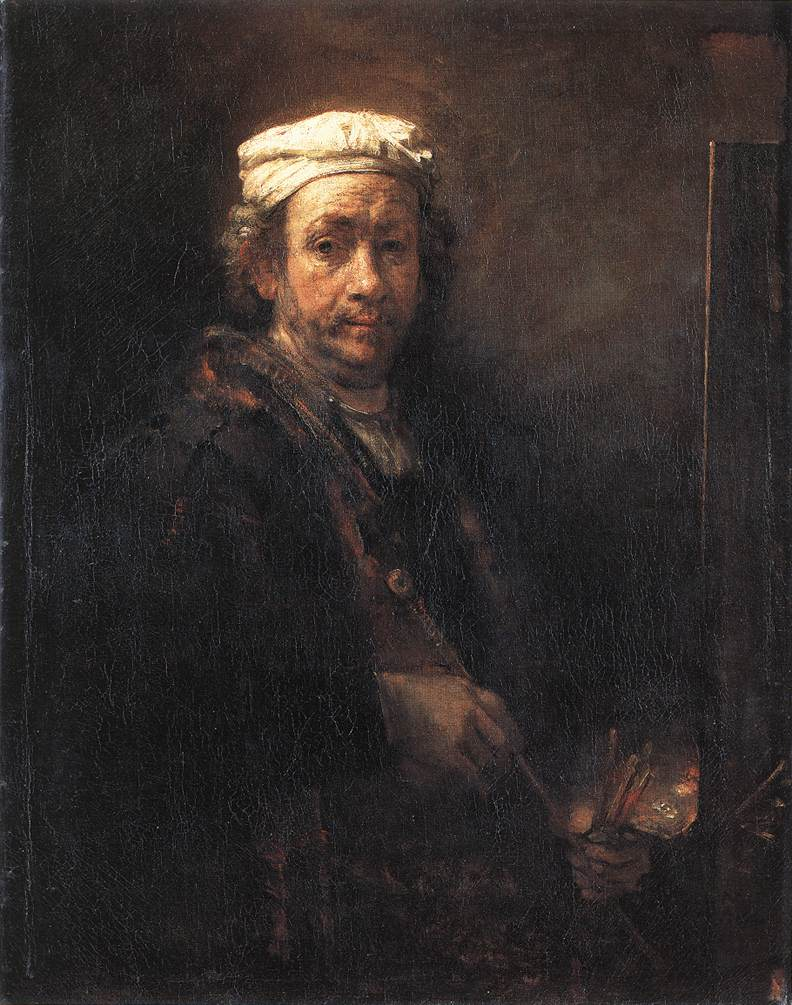
Self Portrait at the Easel, 1660. Louvre Museum, Paris.

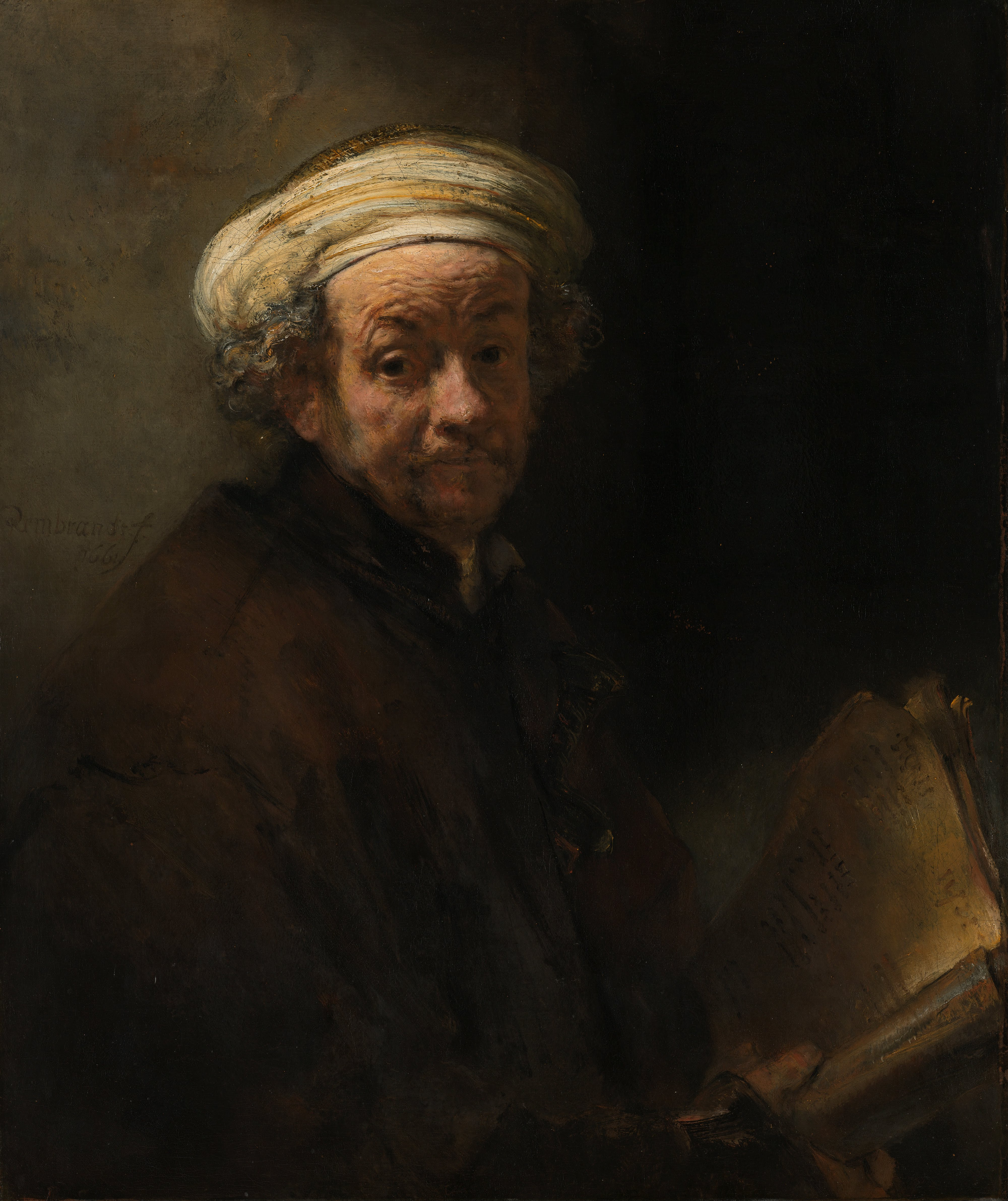
Self-Portrait as the Apostle Paul, 1661. Rijksmuseum, Amsterdam.

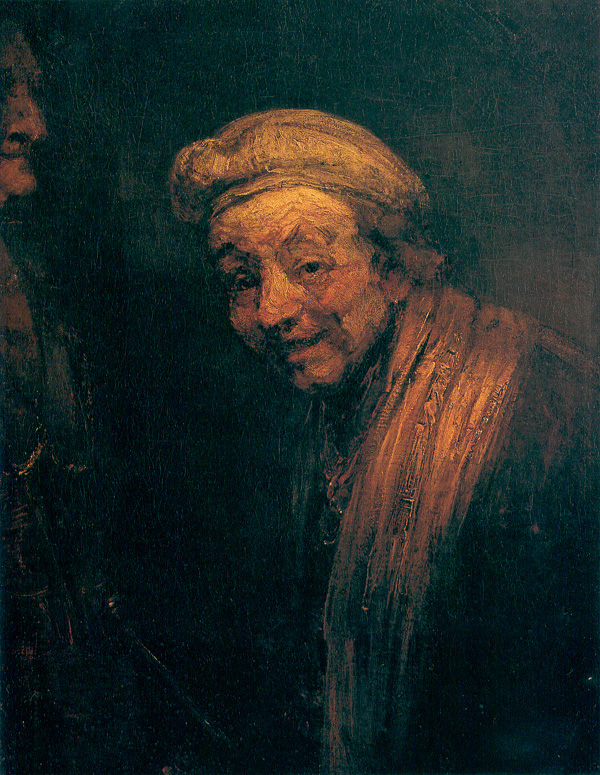
Self Portrait as Zeuxis, c. 1662. One of 2 painted self-portraits in which Rembrandt is turned to the left. Wallraf-Richartz-Museum, Cologne.

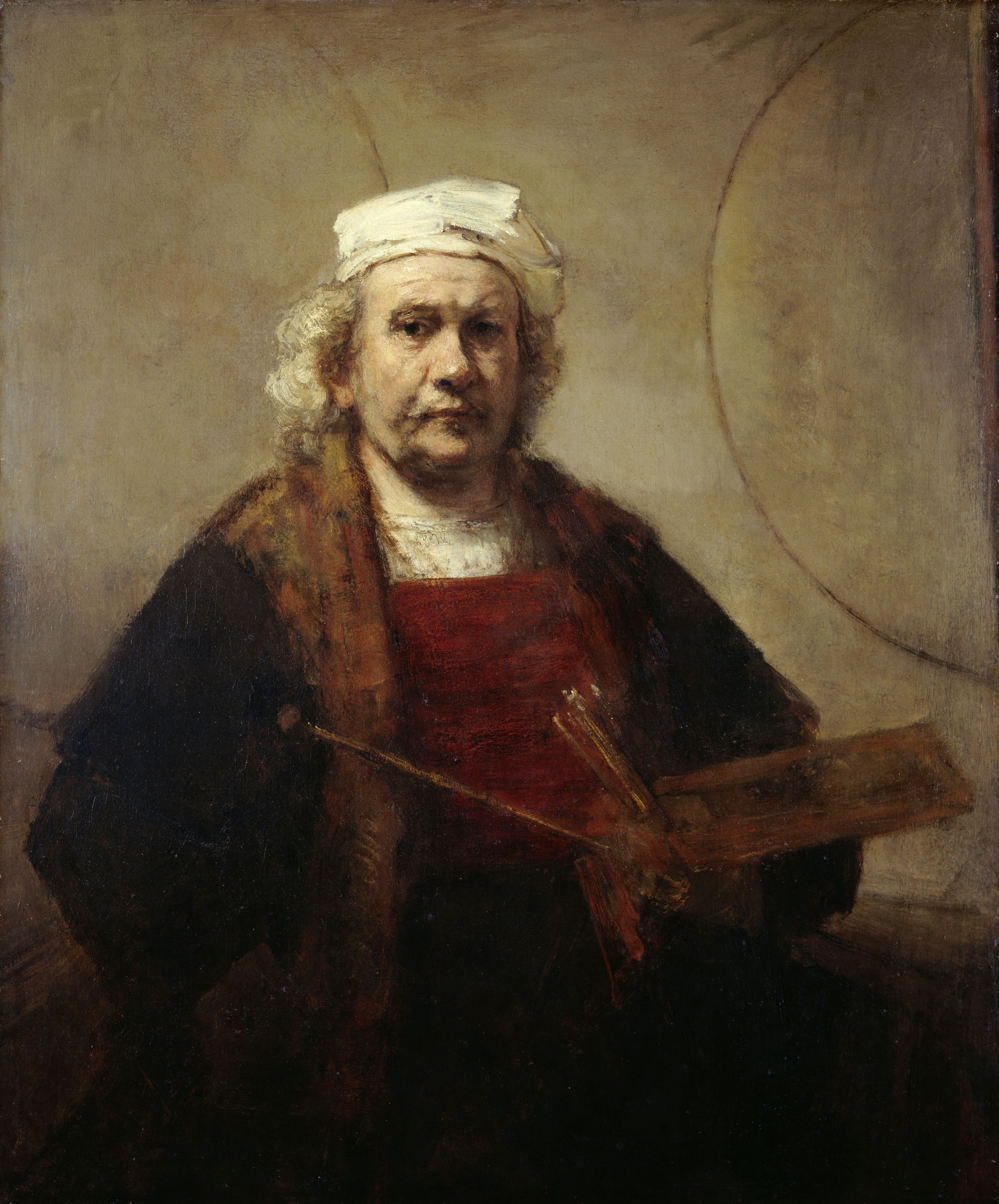
Self-Portrait with Two Circles, 1665–69. Kenwood House, London. The meaning of the circles remains enigmatic. The palette was originally on the left, as he would have seen it in his mirror.

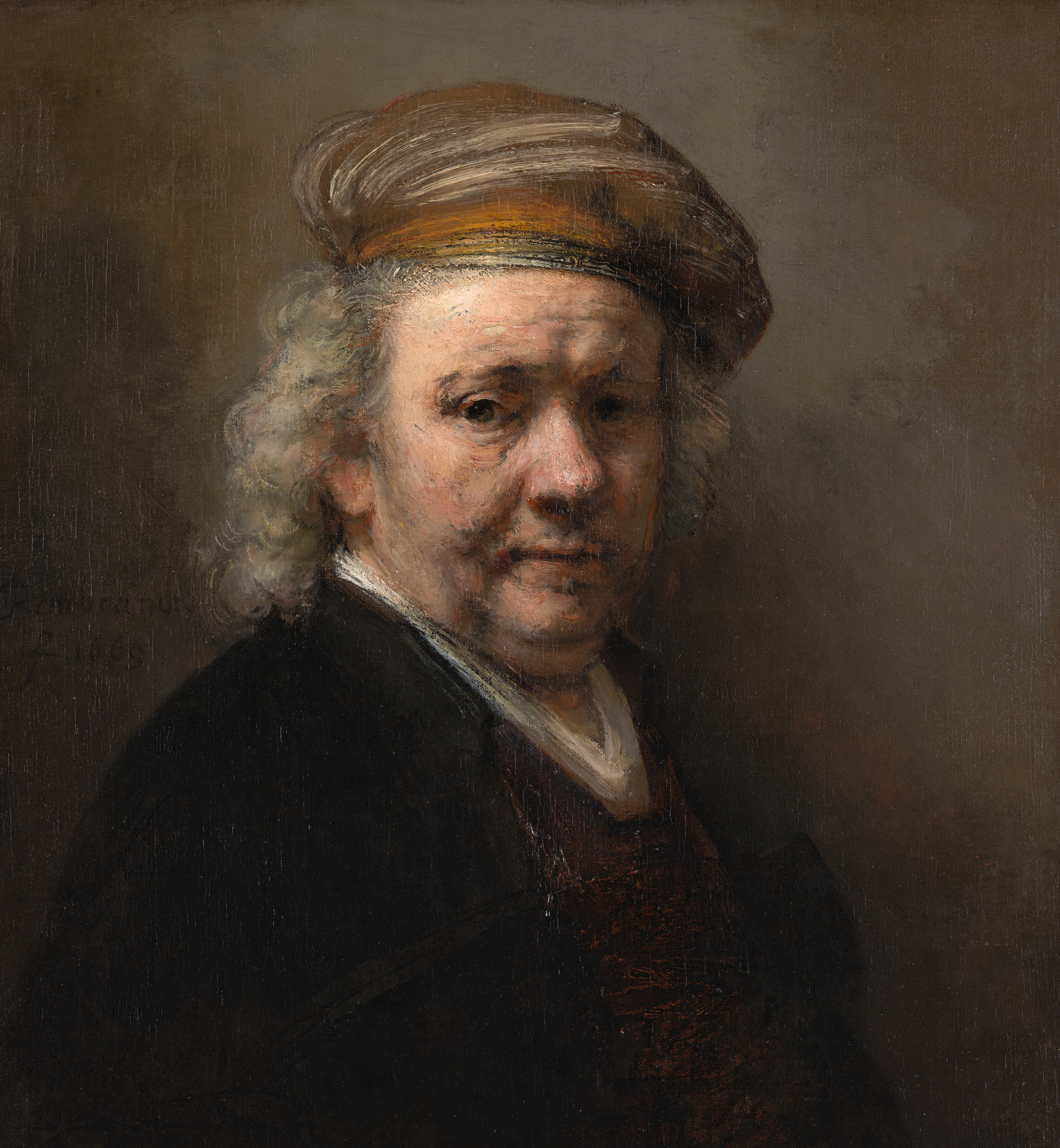
1669, Mauritshuis, The Hague.

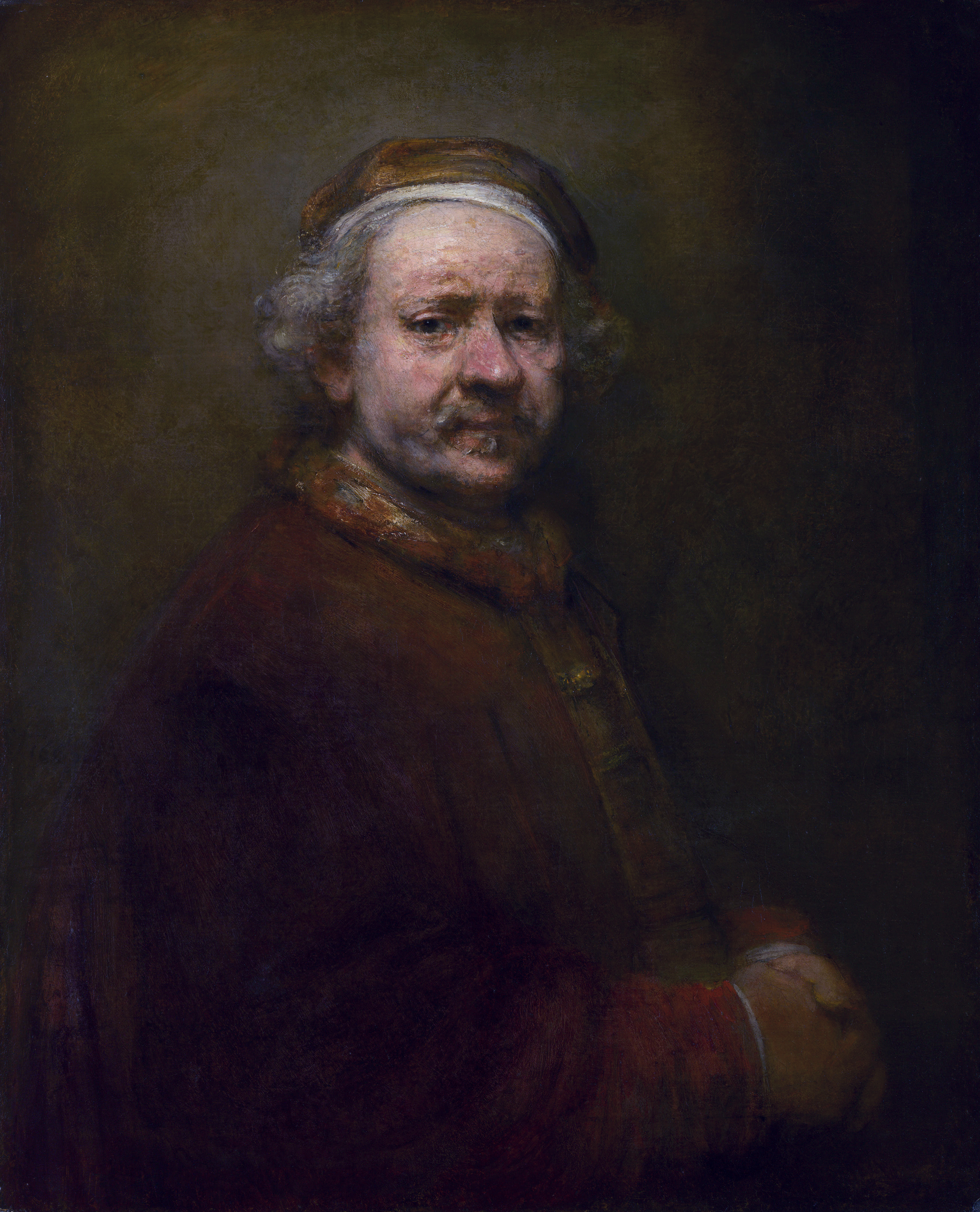
Self-Portrait at the Age of 63 - Dated 1669, the year he died, though he looks much older in other portraits. National Gallery, London.

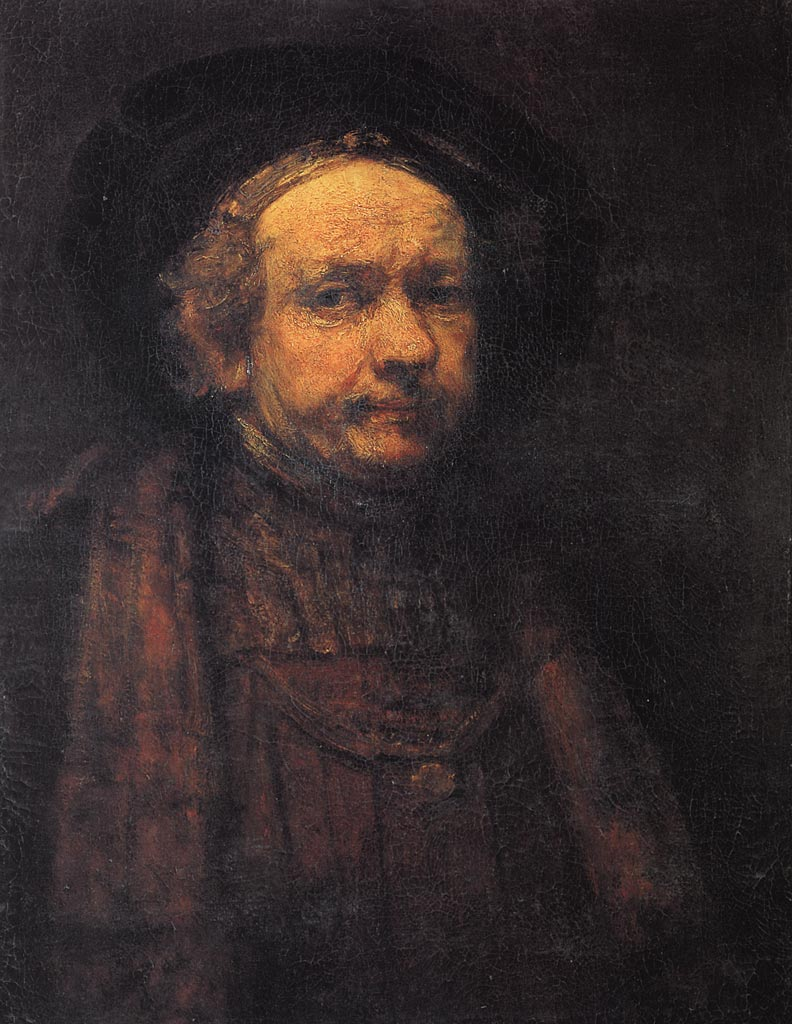
1668–69, Galleria degli Uffizi, Florence

== Etchings ==
Ernst van de Wetering divides the 31 etchings into categories; there "are perhaps only four that were considered by Rembrandt himself as 'official' self-portraits of himself intended for wider dissemination". These are B7, B19, B21 and B22, stretching between 1631 and 1648. There are a number (7 or 8) of what seem to be abandoned attempts at such portraits around the same times, some then used as etching "study sheets". Then there are 10 "early studies in etching technique", most very rare, five "studies in expression", which he distinguishes from the three tronies, finished images using Rembrandt's own features in historical costume.

While the earliest etchings are very rare, many others that are not "official" portraits survive in large numbers, and certainly reached the market of collectors. He notes that such aspects of the painted portraits as historical dress, poses recalling famous Renaissance portraits, a double portrait with Saskia, and portraits in his studio working clothes, are all seen in the etchings before they appear in painted self-portraits. As noted above, there are only two sketchy etchings after 1648, and there are no etched equivalents of the great painted self-portraits of the 1650s and 1660s.

With Bartsch catalogue numbers.

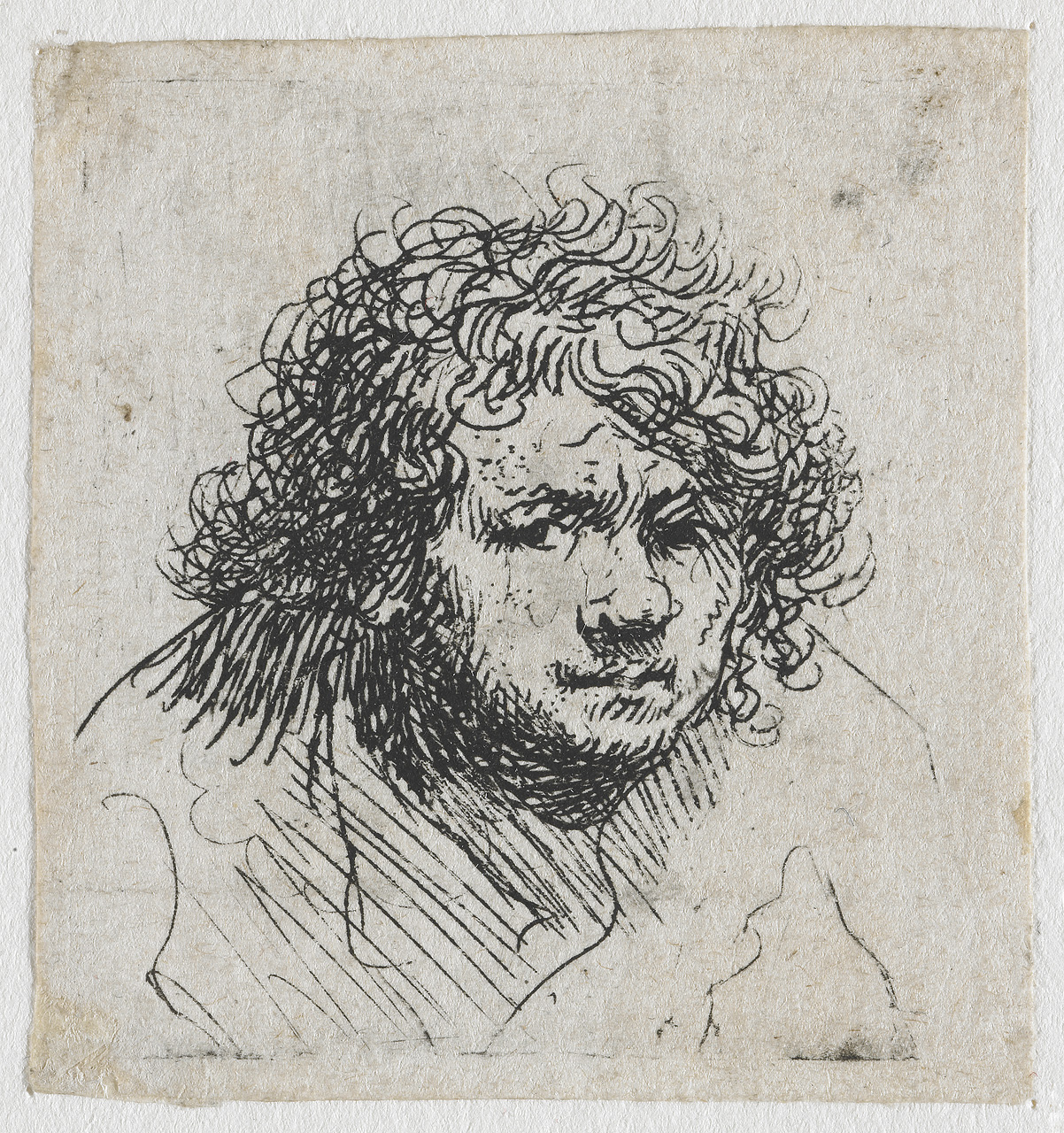
B5, c. 1628, ii of two states. On an abandoned plate.

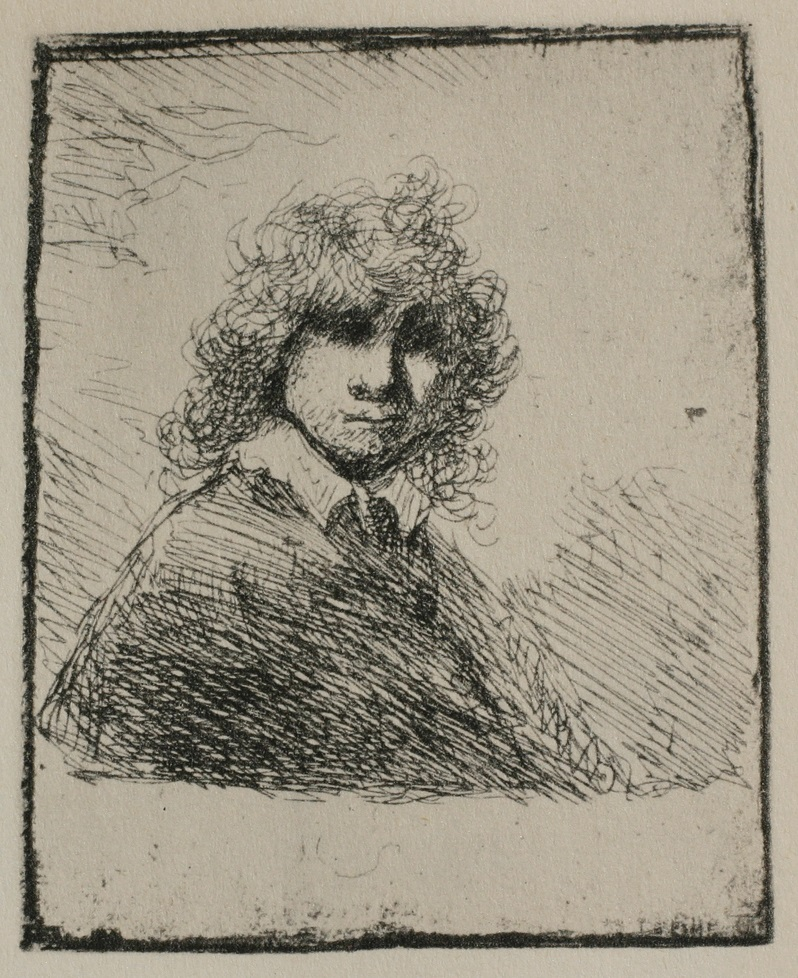
B27, about 1628. Only three impressions survive

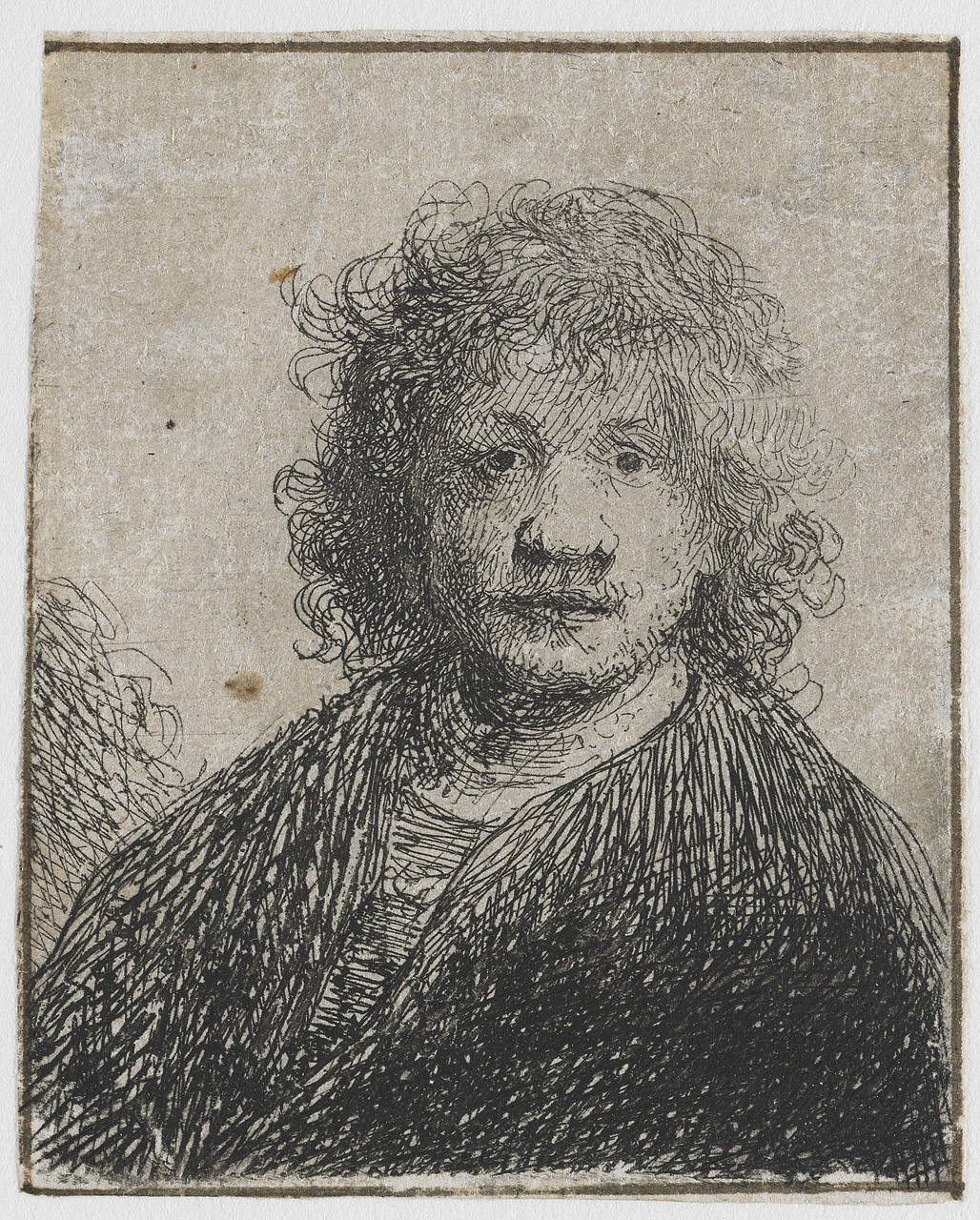
B4, c. 1628. Already wearing historical dress.

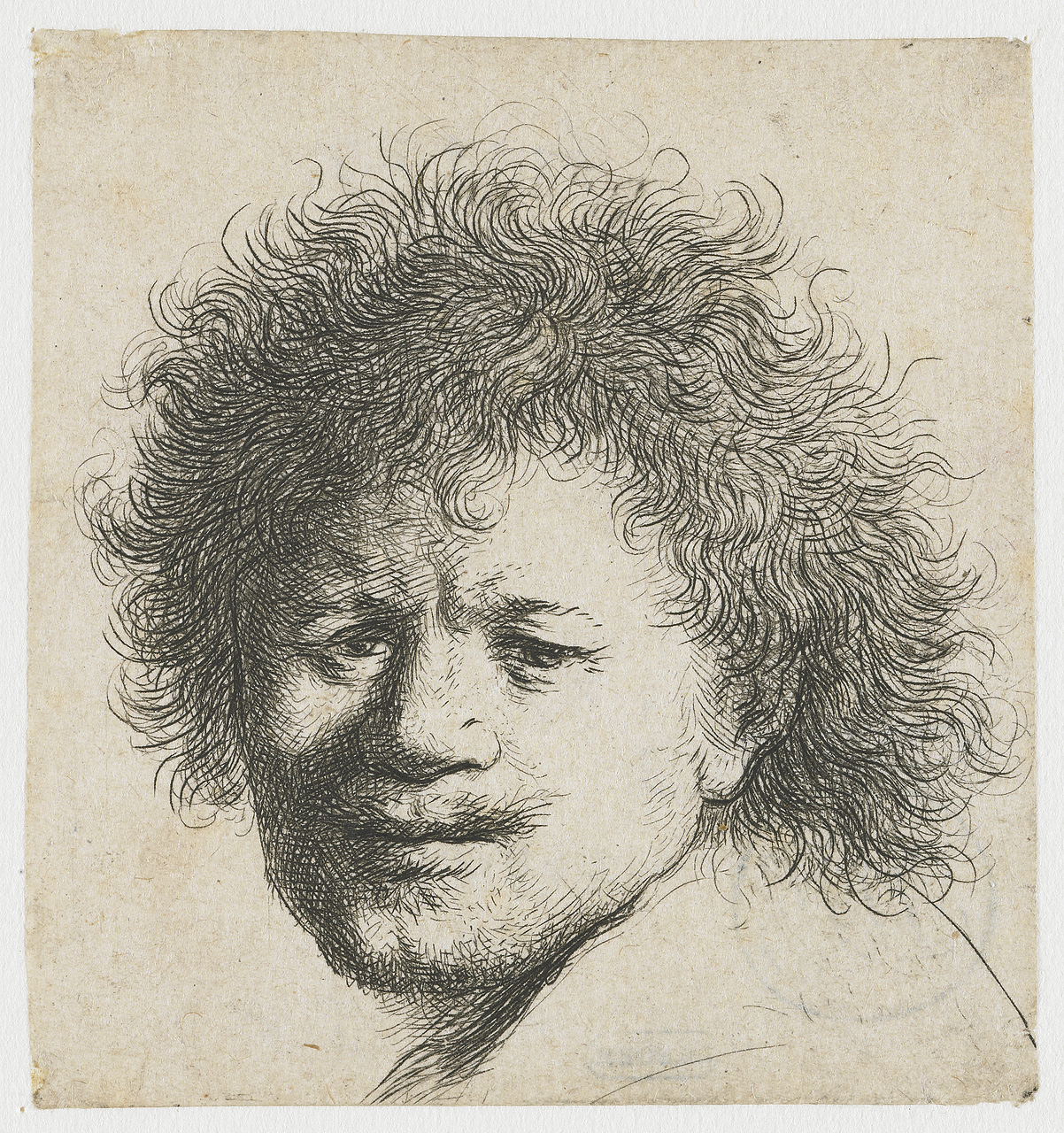
B8, c. 1631, 6 states, the earliest with a much larger plate. Apparently an abandoned attempt at a half-length portrait such as B7.

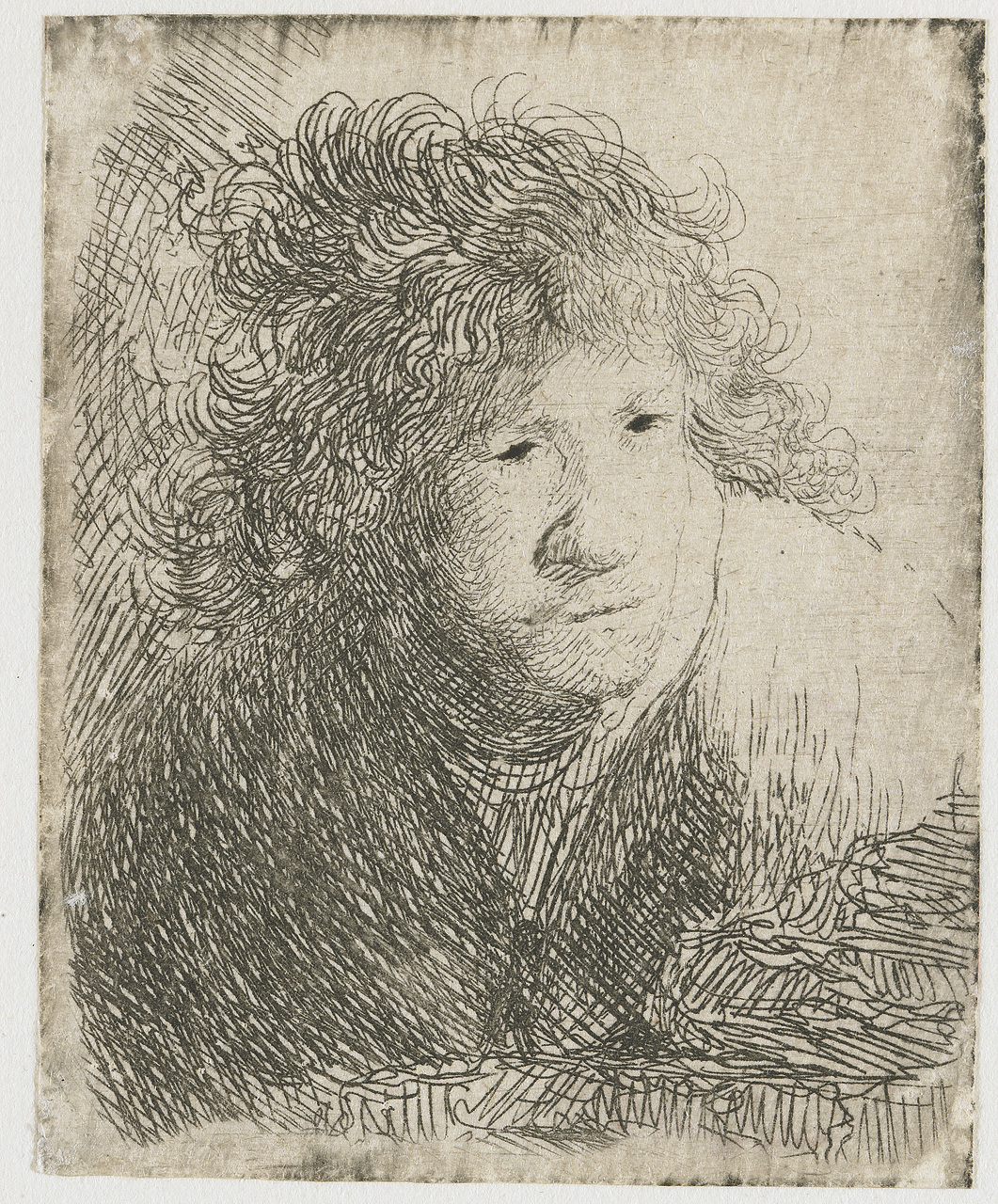
B9, c. 1628, 6 states

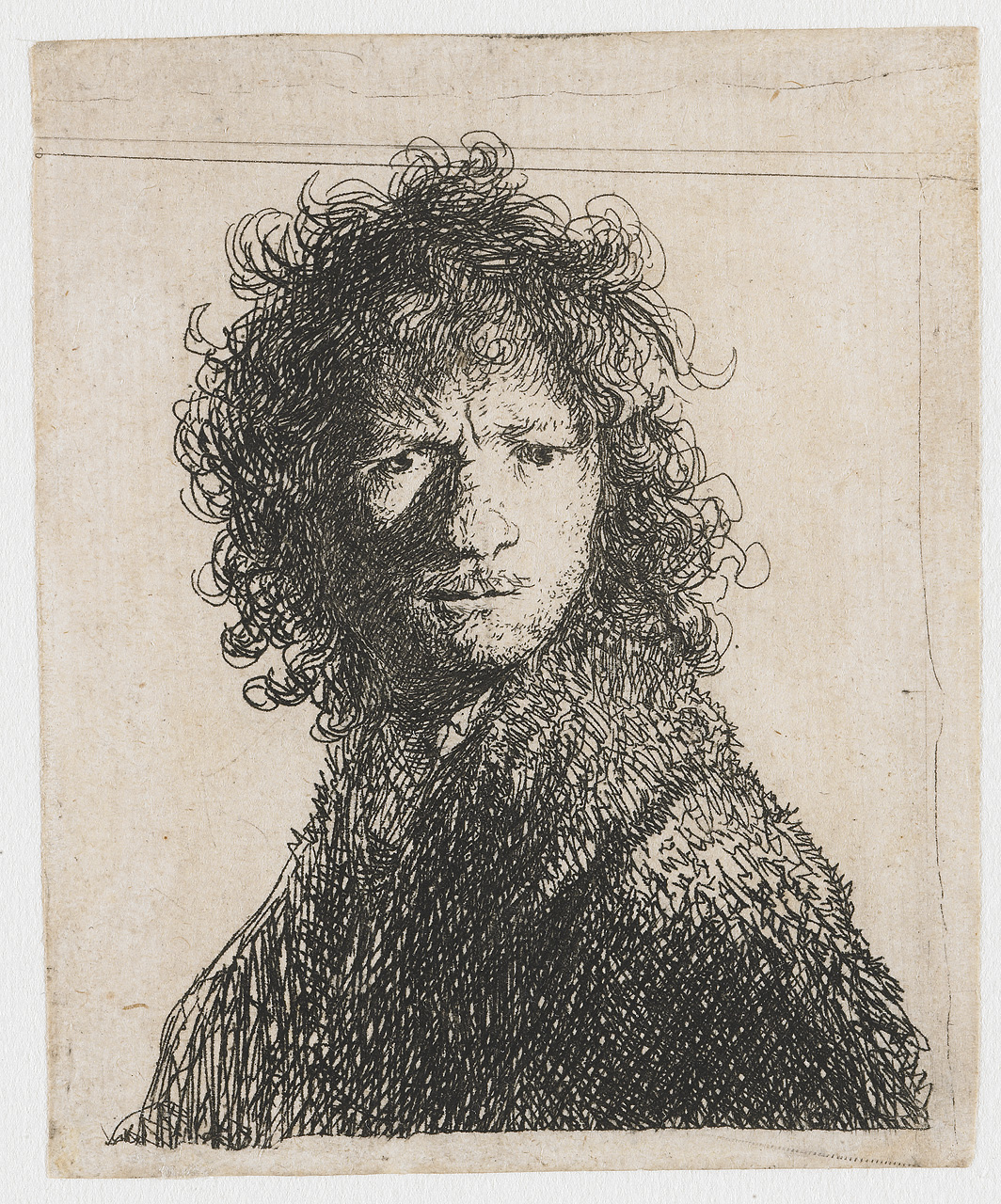
B10, 1630, 3 states, one of van de Wetering's "studies in expression".

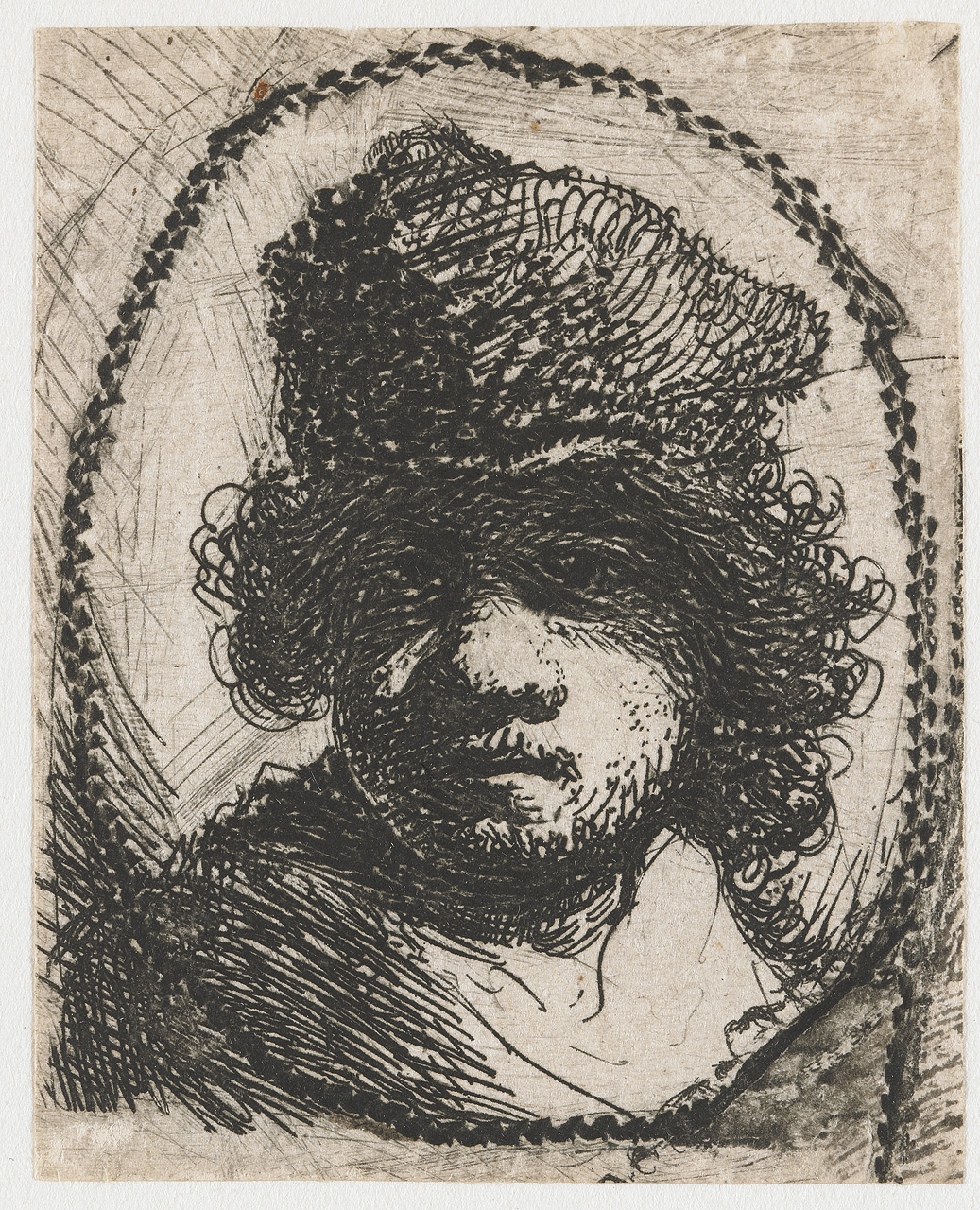
B12, c. 1629, 4 impressions survive

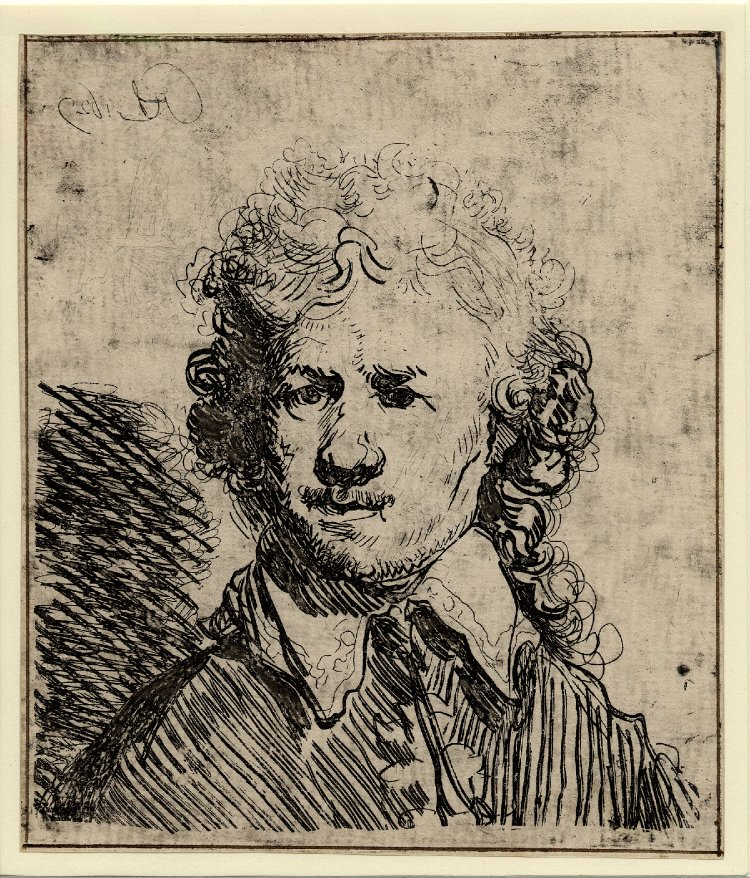
B338, 1629, one of two impressions, here with pen additions, British Museum, also Rijksmuseum.

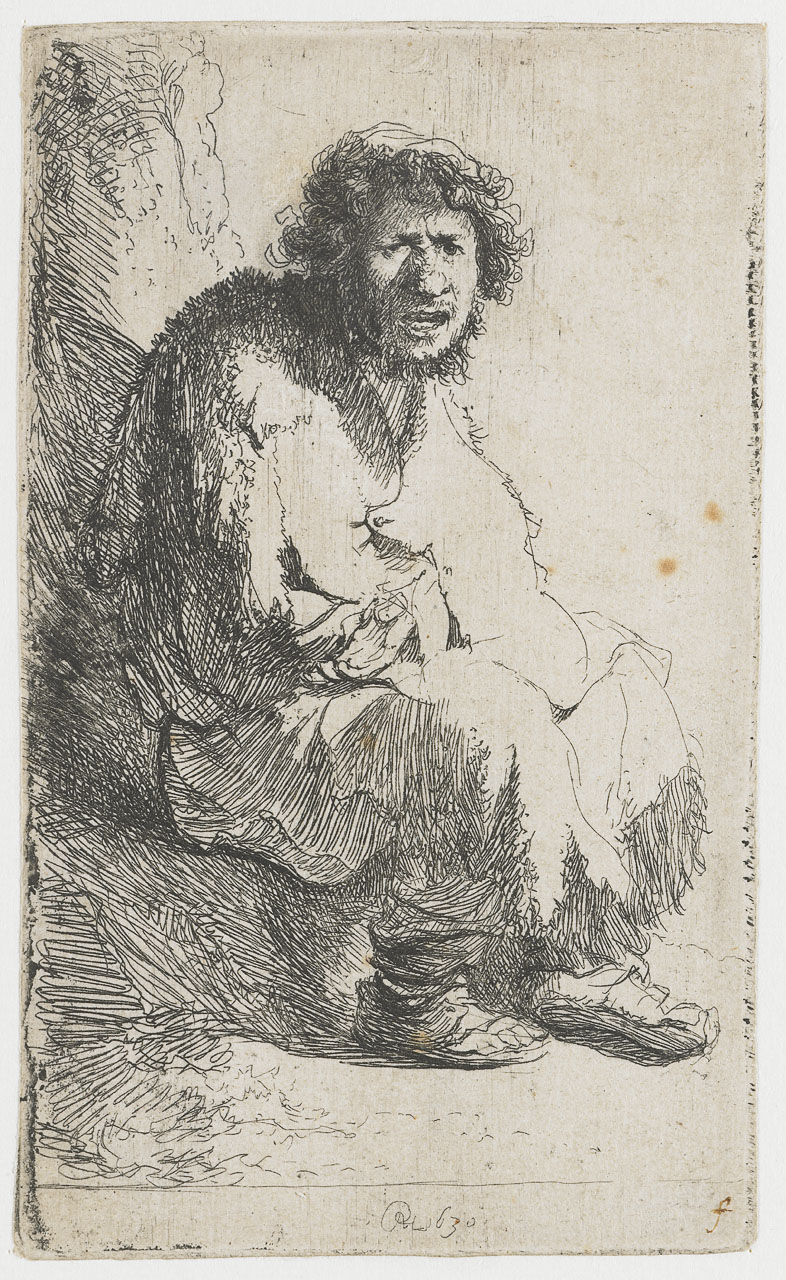
B174, 1630, Beggar seated on a bank. Probably using Rembrandt's features, but not really a self-portrait.

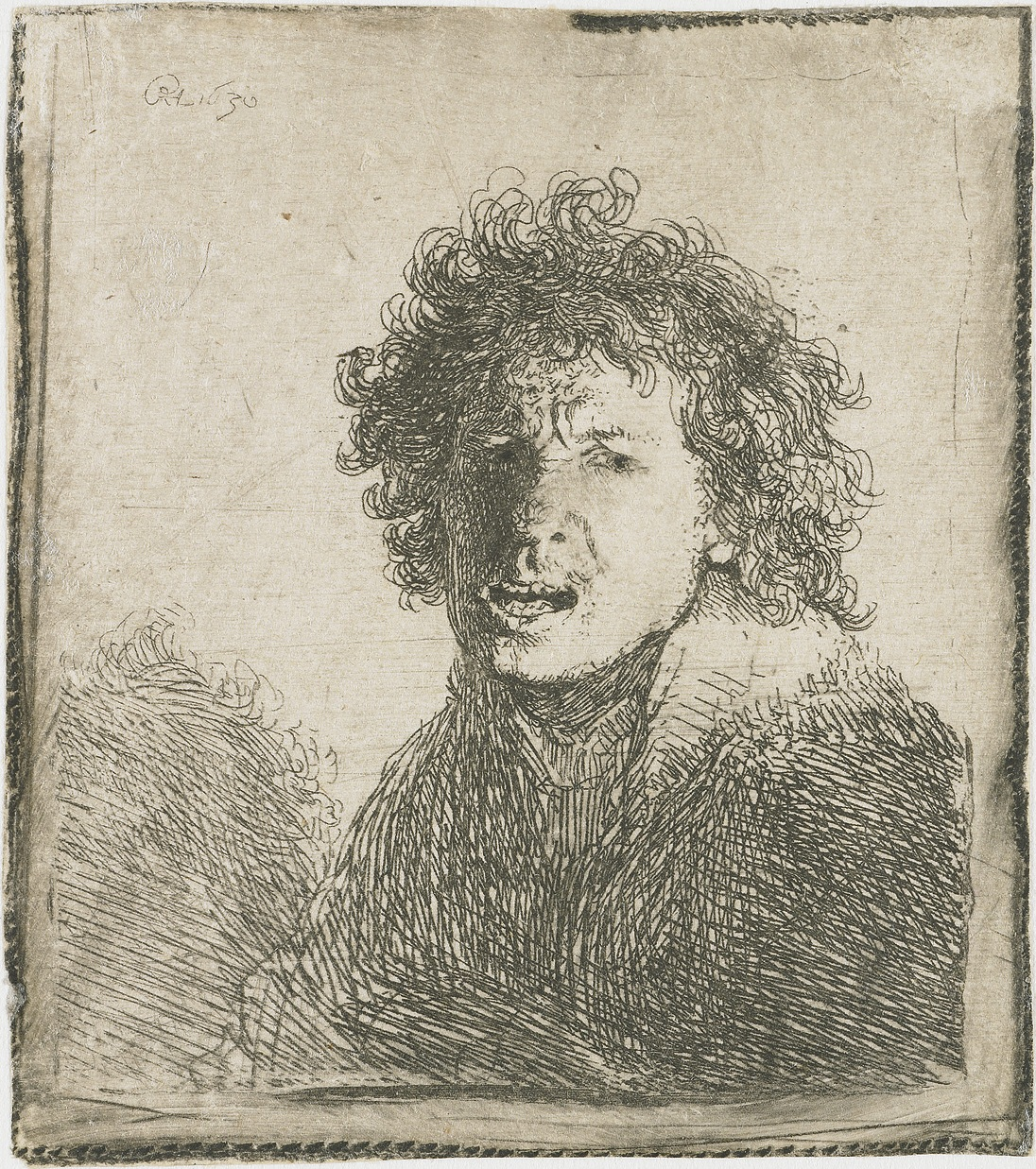
B13, 1630, state 3/3, one of van de Wetering's "studies in expression".

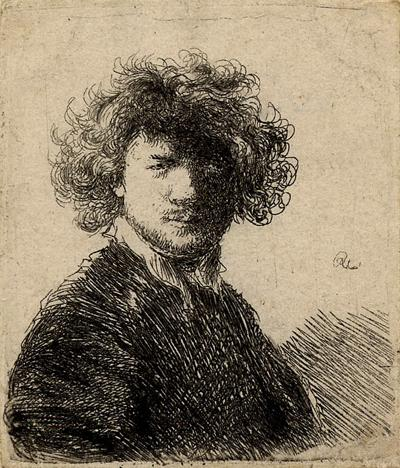
B1, c. 1630

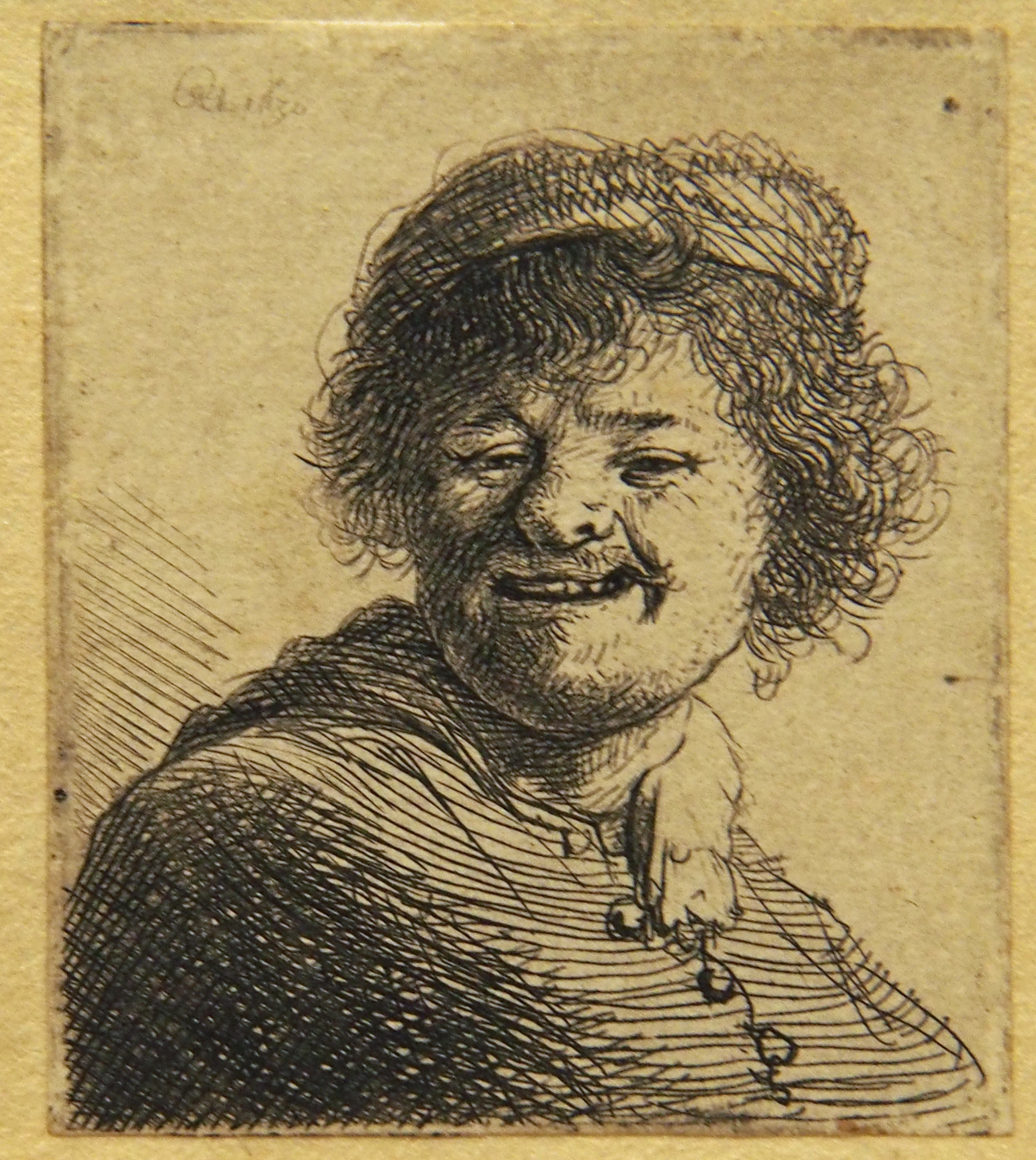
B316, 1630, 6 states, one of van de Wetering's "studies in expression".

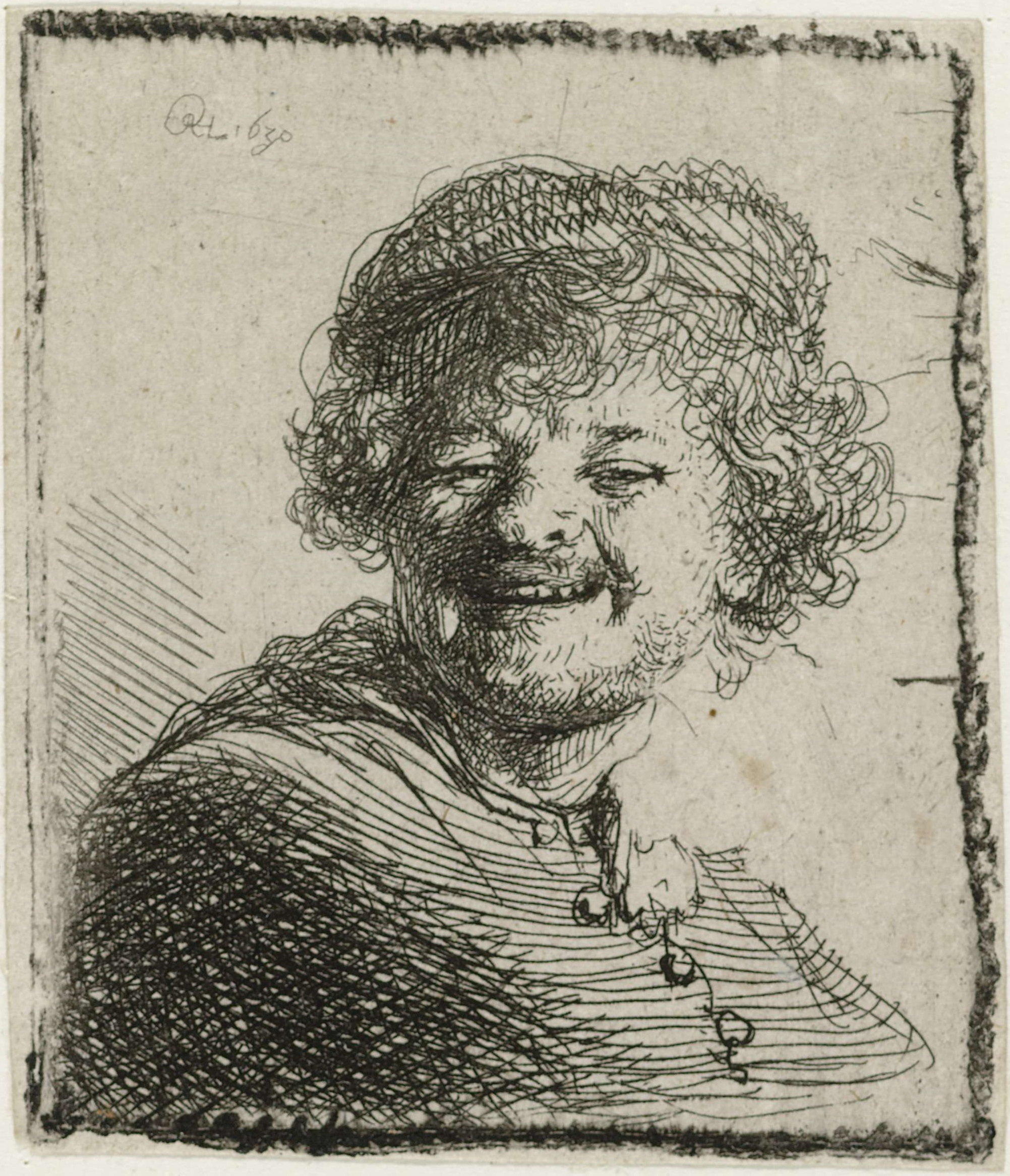
B316, state i, Rijksmuseum

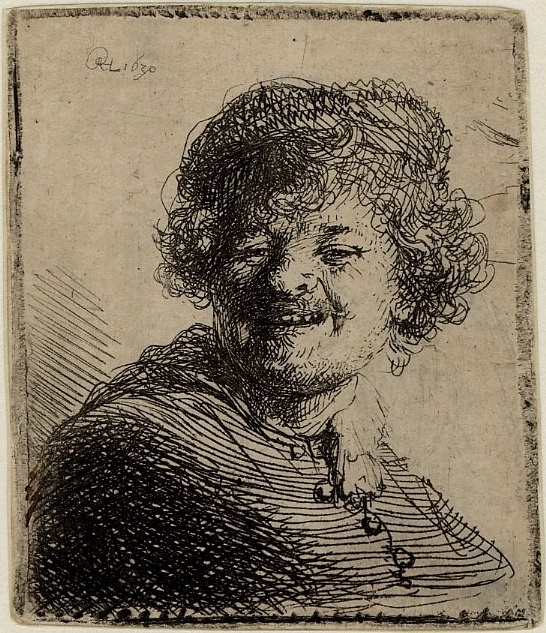
B316, state ii, British Museum

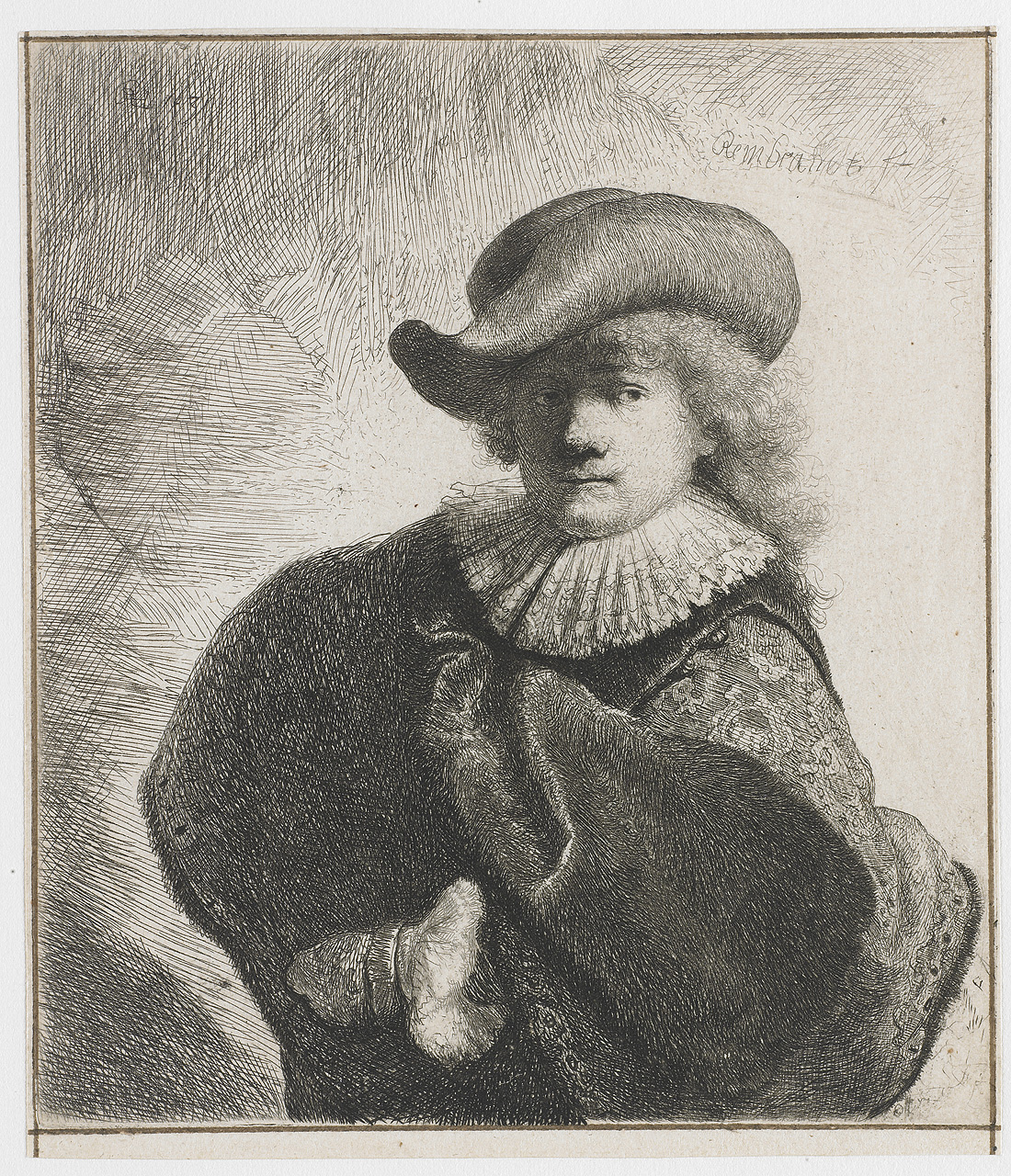
B7, 1631, 11 states, perhaps over some years. Only the head is done in i–iv, and some impressions have drawn additions trying body poses. The first of the "official" etched self-portraits.

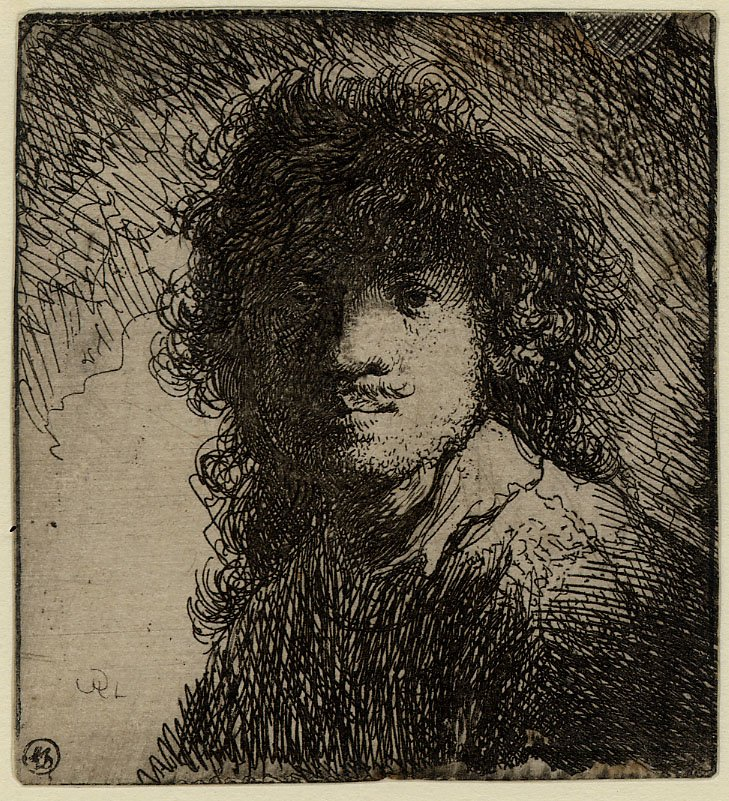
c. 1629

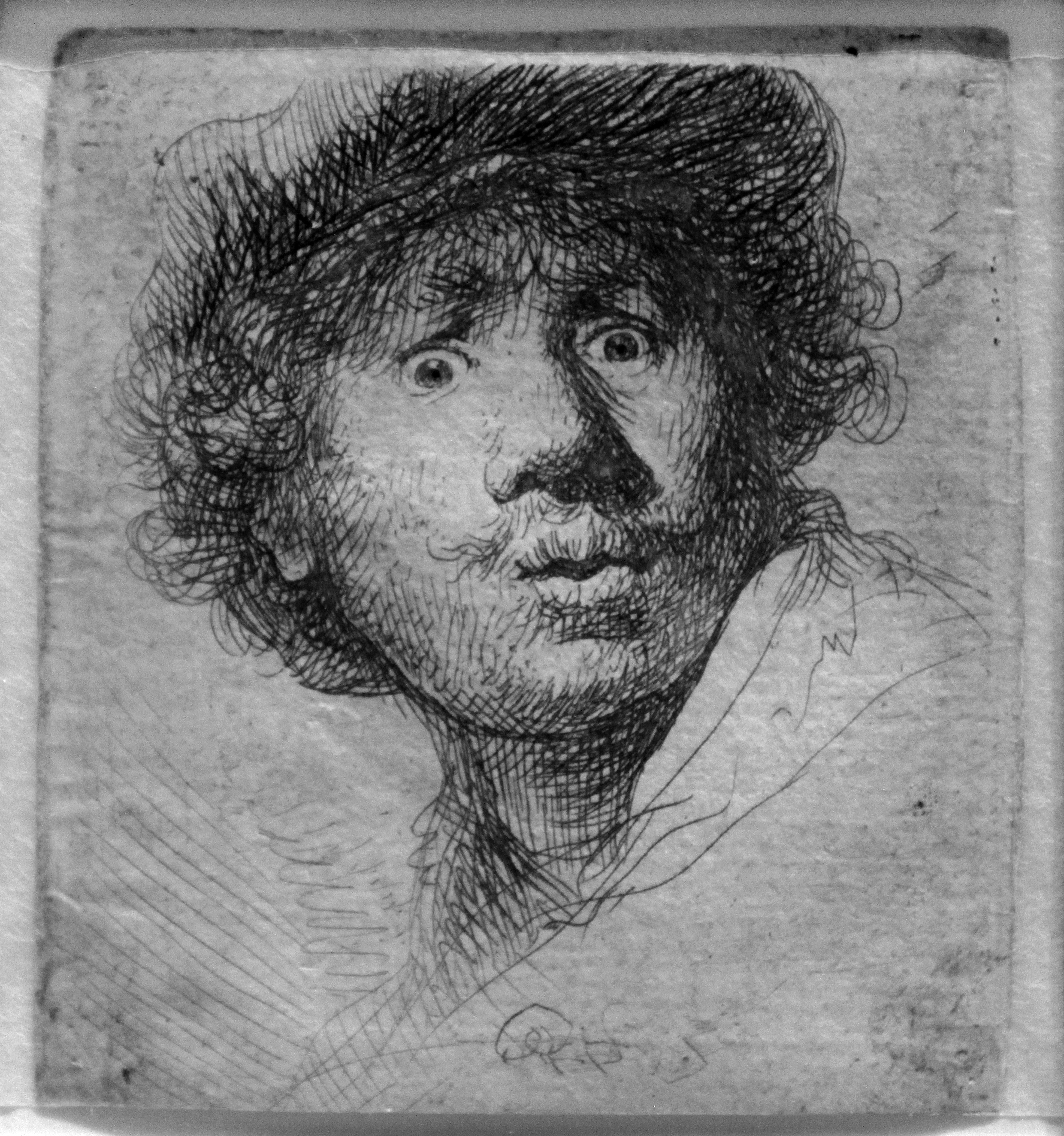
B320, 1630, one of van de Wetering's "studies in expression".

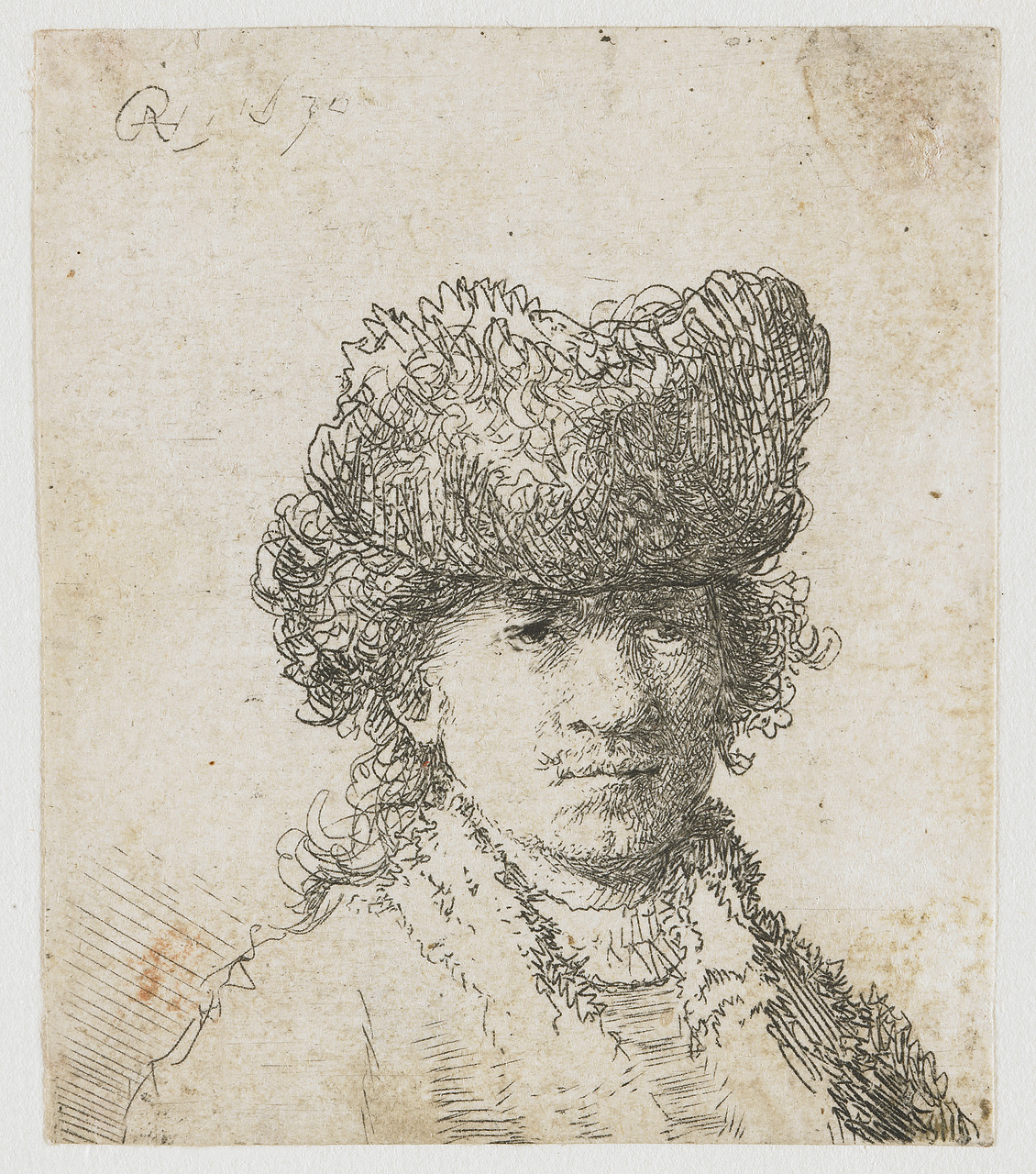
B24, 1630

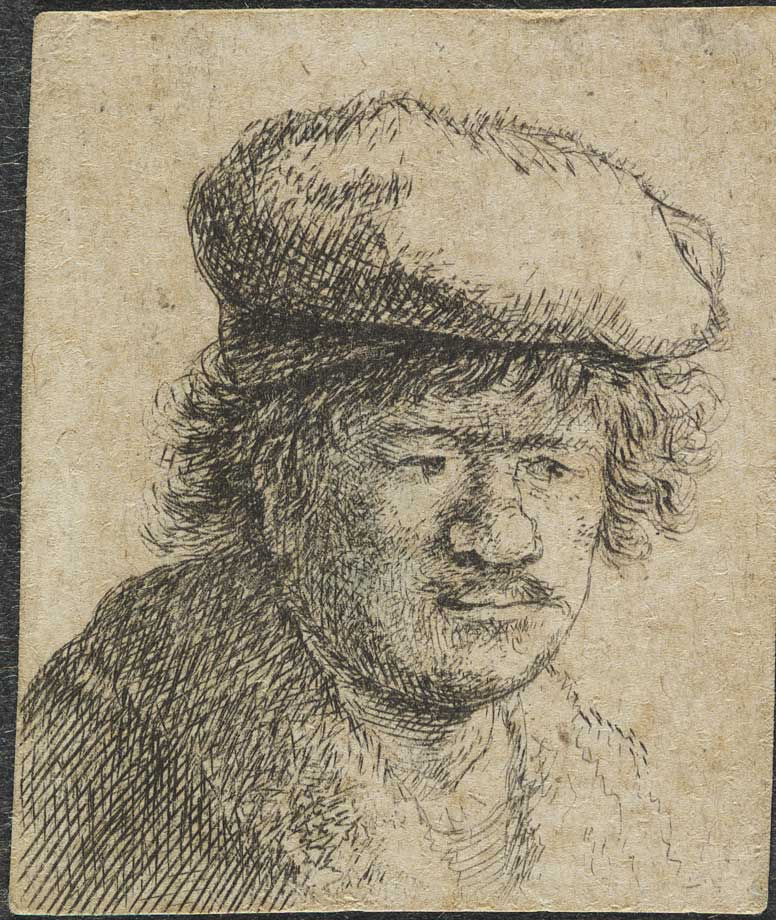
B319, 6 states

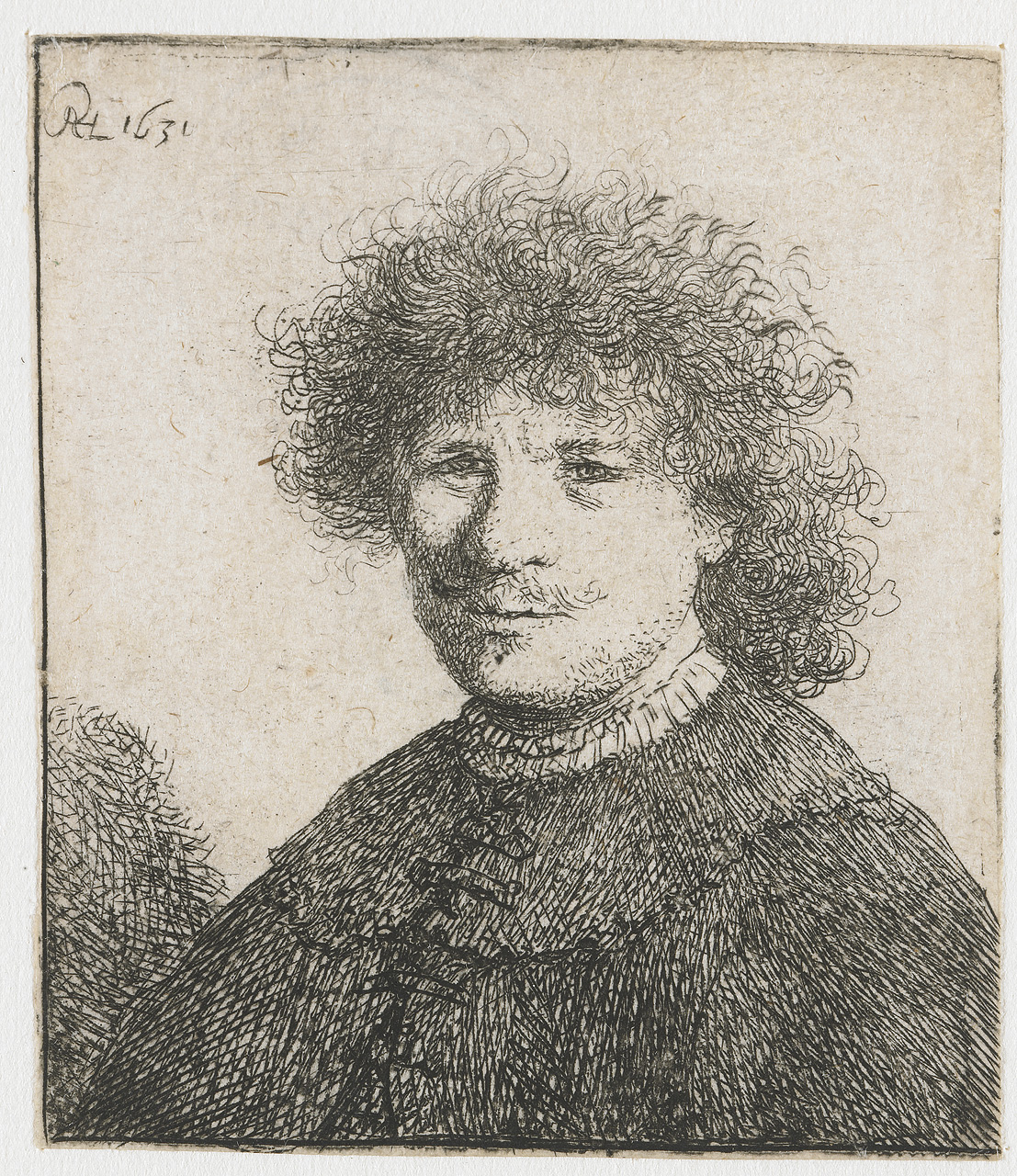
B15, 1631

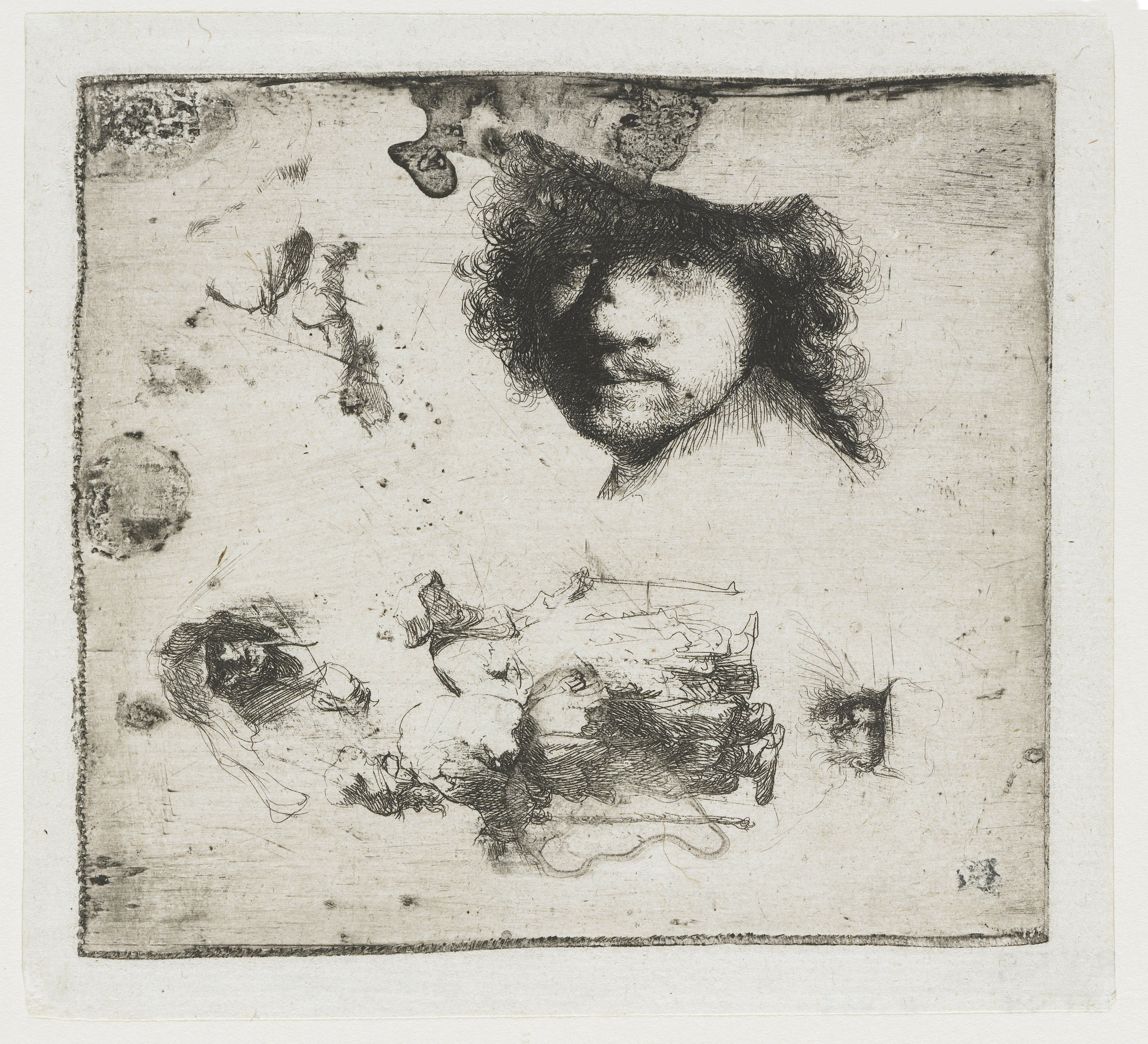
B363, c. 1632. Perhaps abandoned before the hat is added, and the plate recycled for studies.

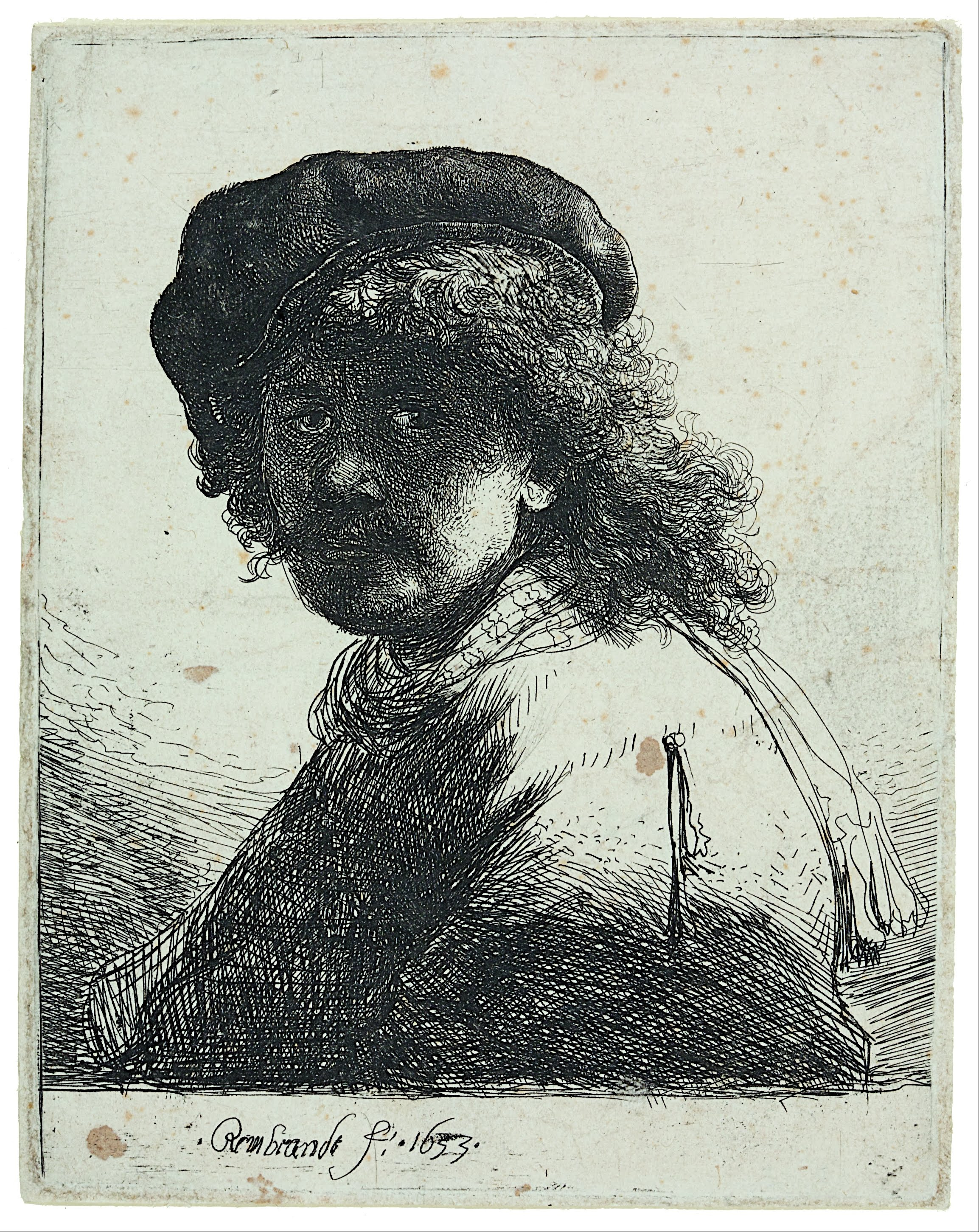
B17, 1633, 2 states, one of van de Wetering's tronies.

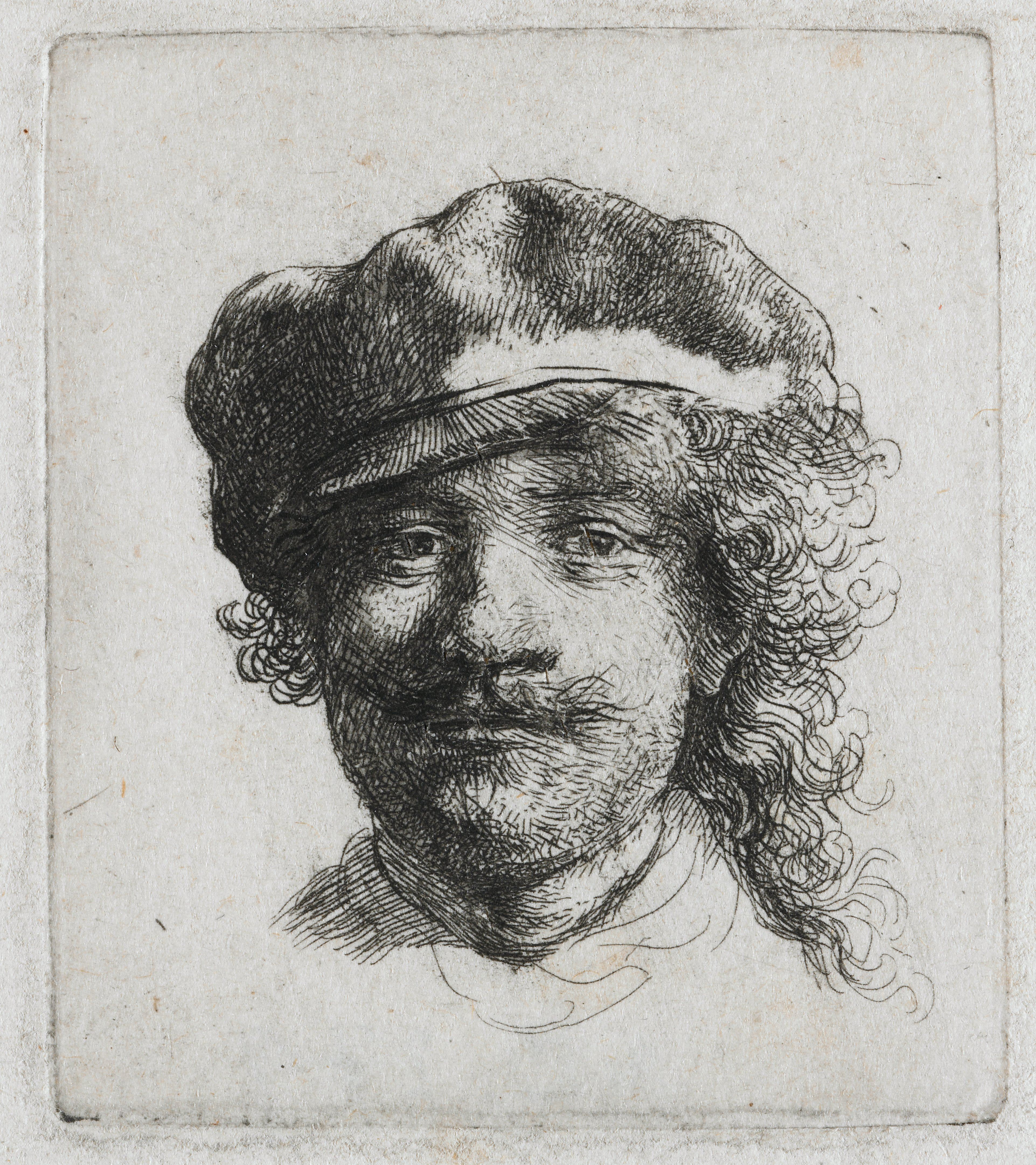
B2, c. 1634. Compare the Washington red chalk drawing below.

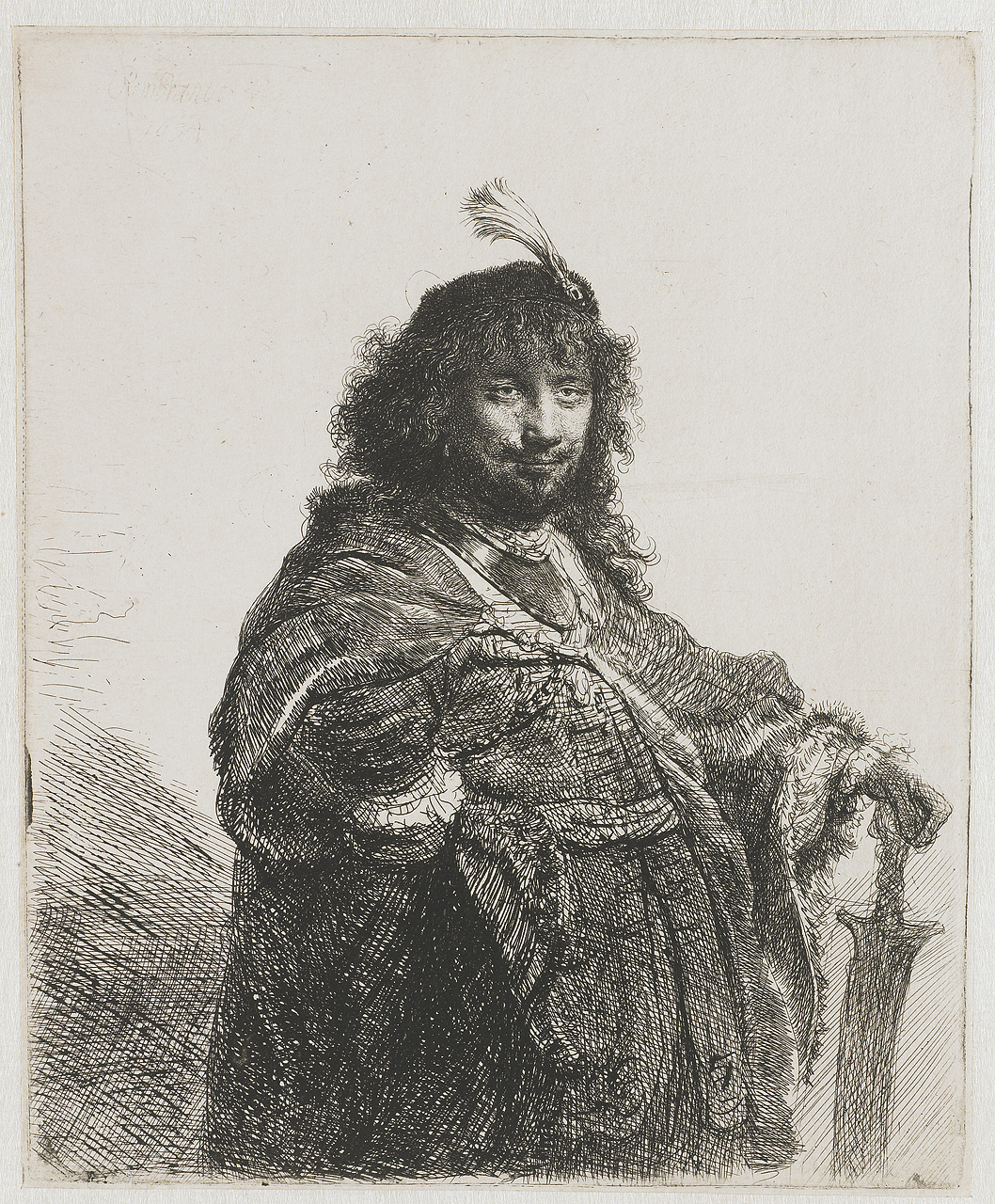
B23, 1634, 3 states. As a rather sinister Oriental figure, with added bulk and a wart near the nose.

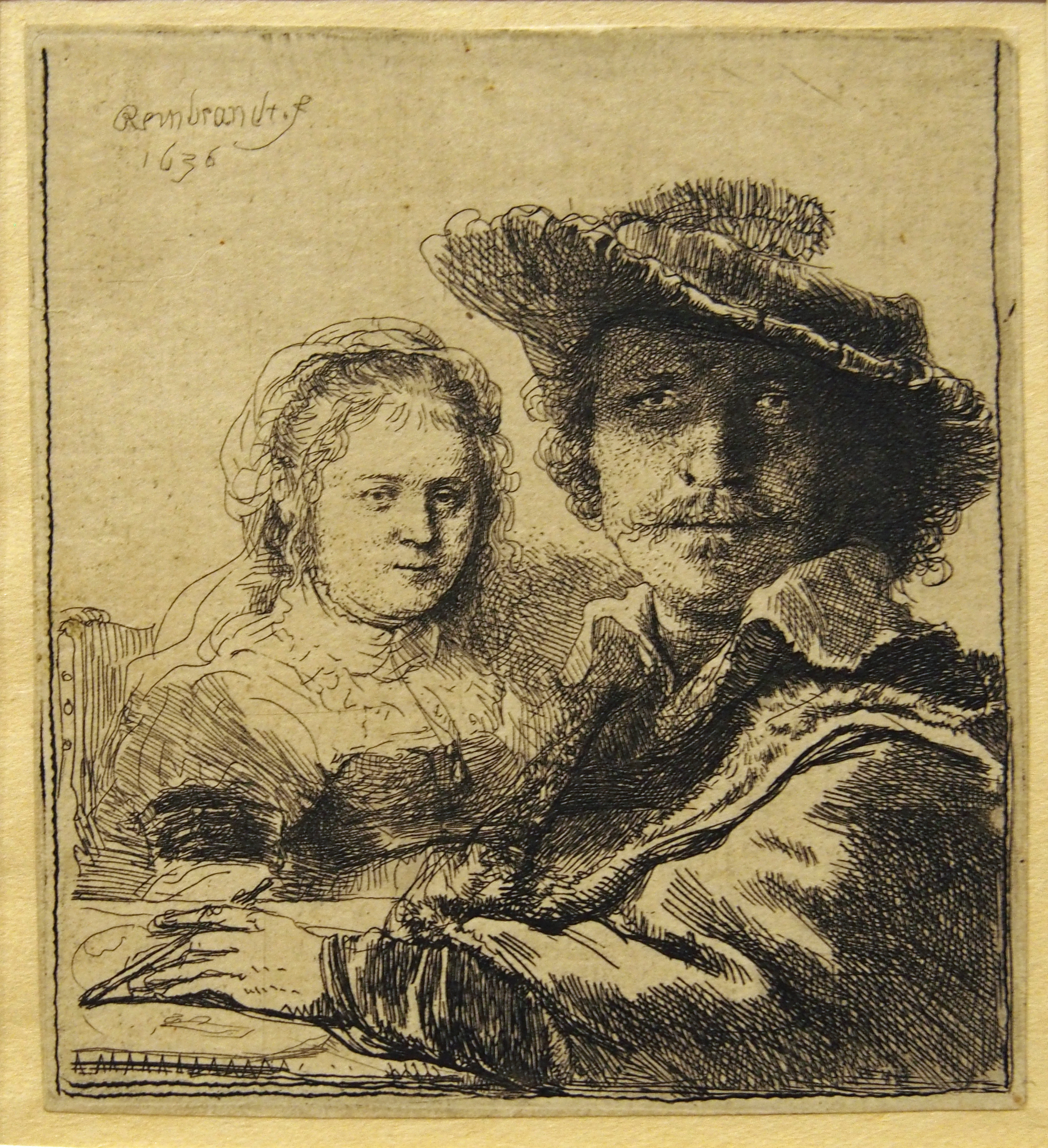
B19, Self-portrait with Saskia, etching, 1636, one of the "official" etched self-portraits.

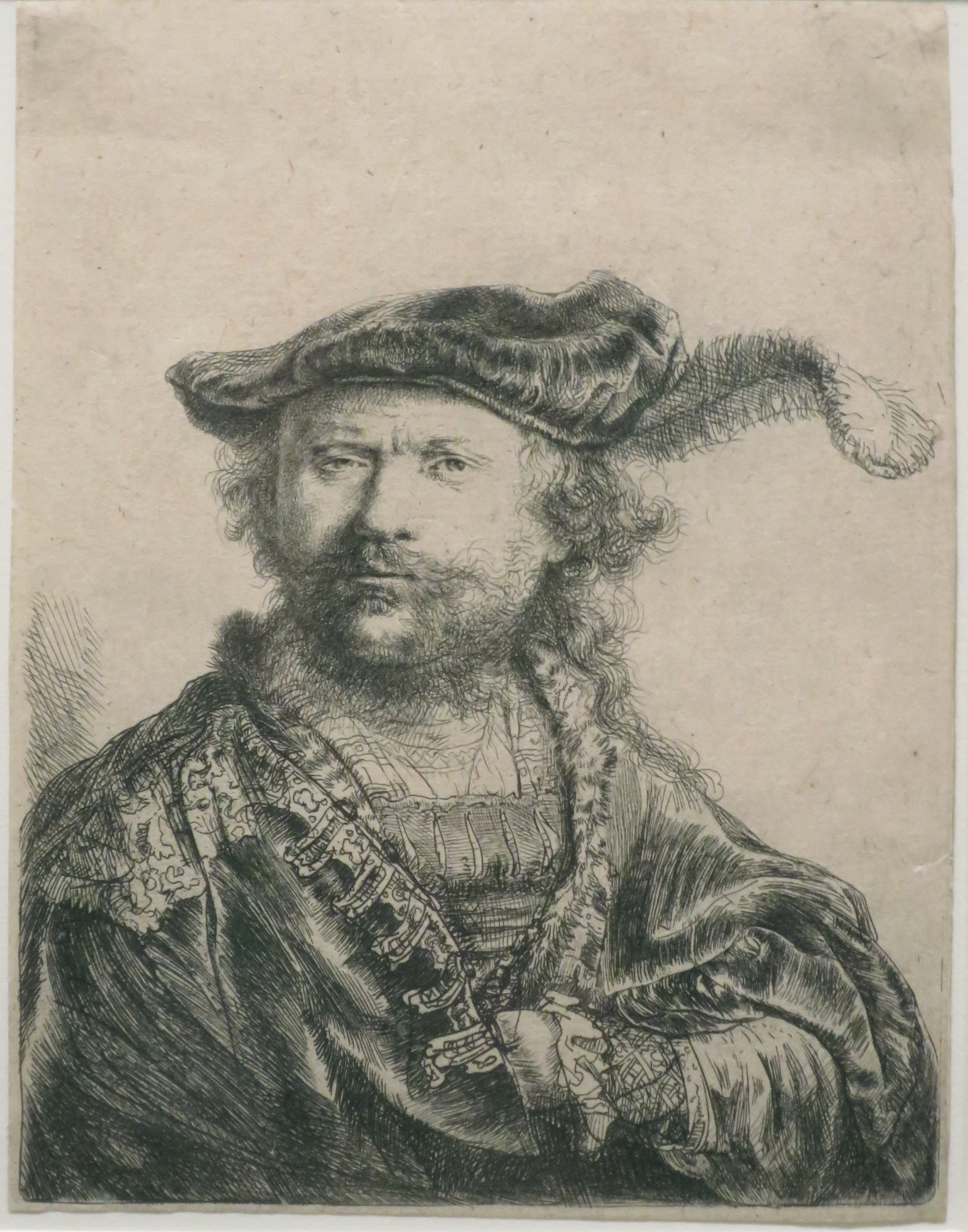
B20, 1638, one of van de Wetering's tronies, in the dress of an aristocrat from a century earlier, with an invented beard to match.

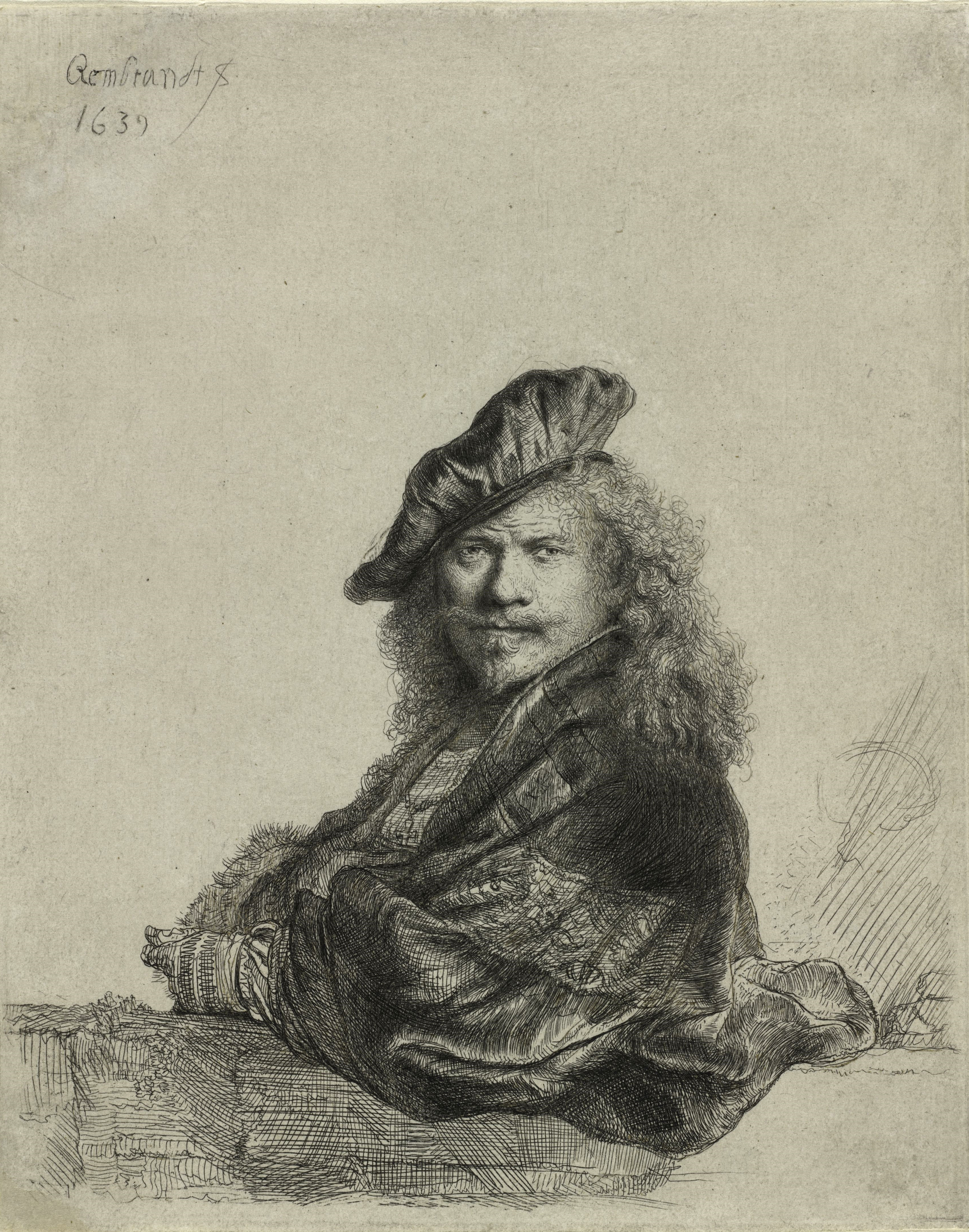
B21, Self-portrait leaning on a Sill, etching, 1639, 2 states. The pose draws on portraits by Titian and Raphael, A Man with a Quilted Sleeve (NG, London) and Portrait of Baldassare Castiglione (Louvre) respectively. One of the "official" etched self-portraits.

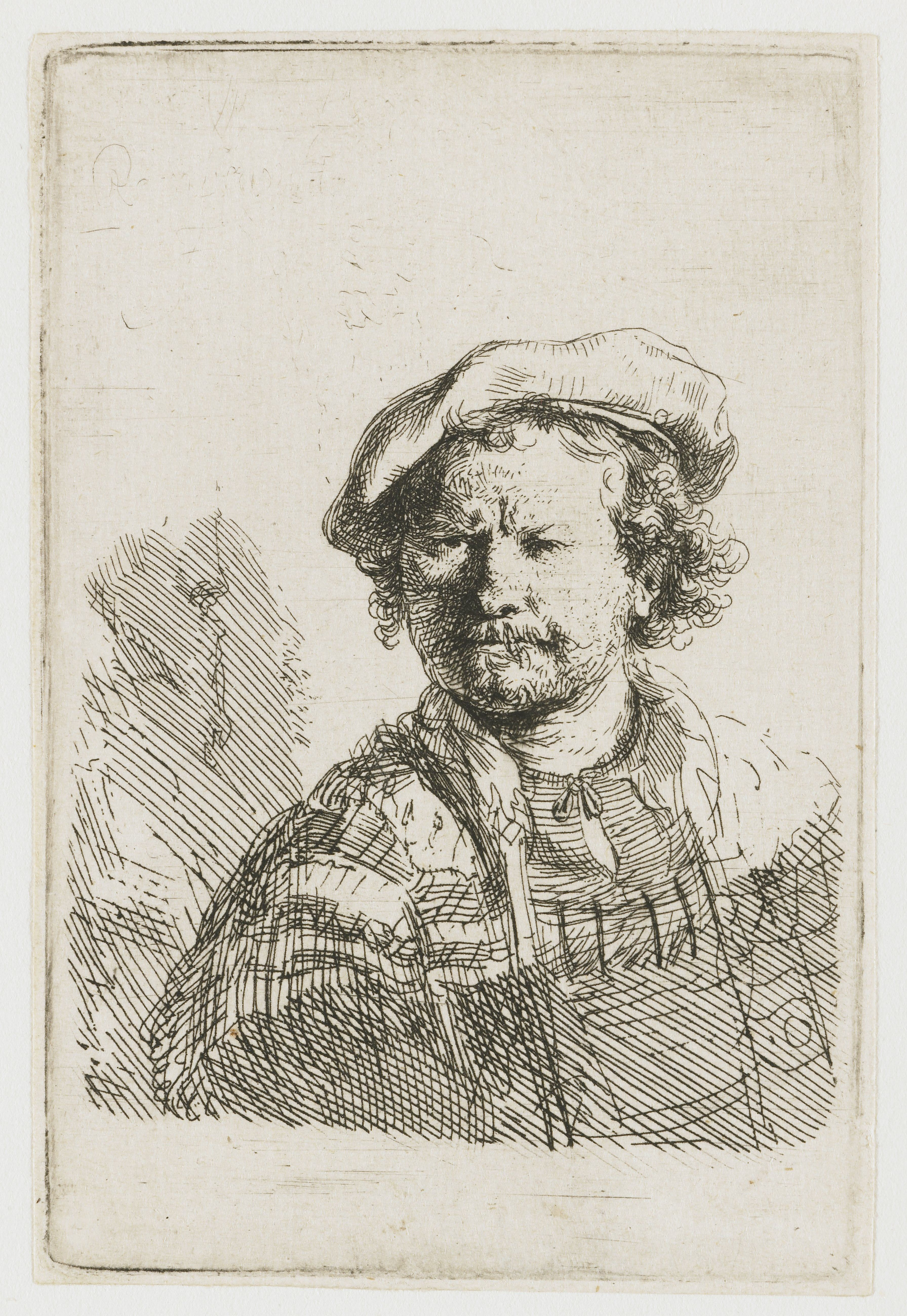
B26, c. 1642

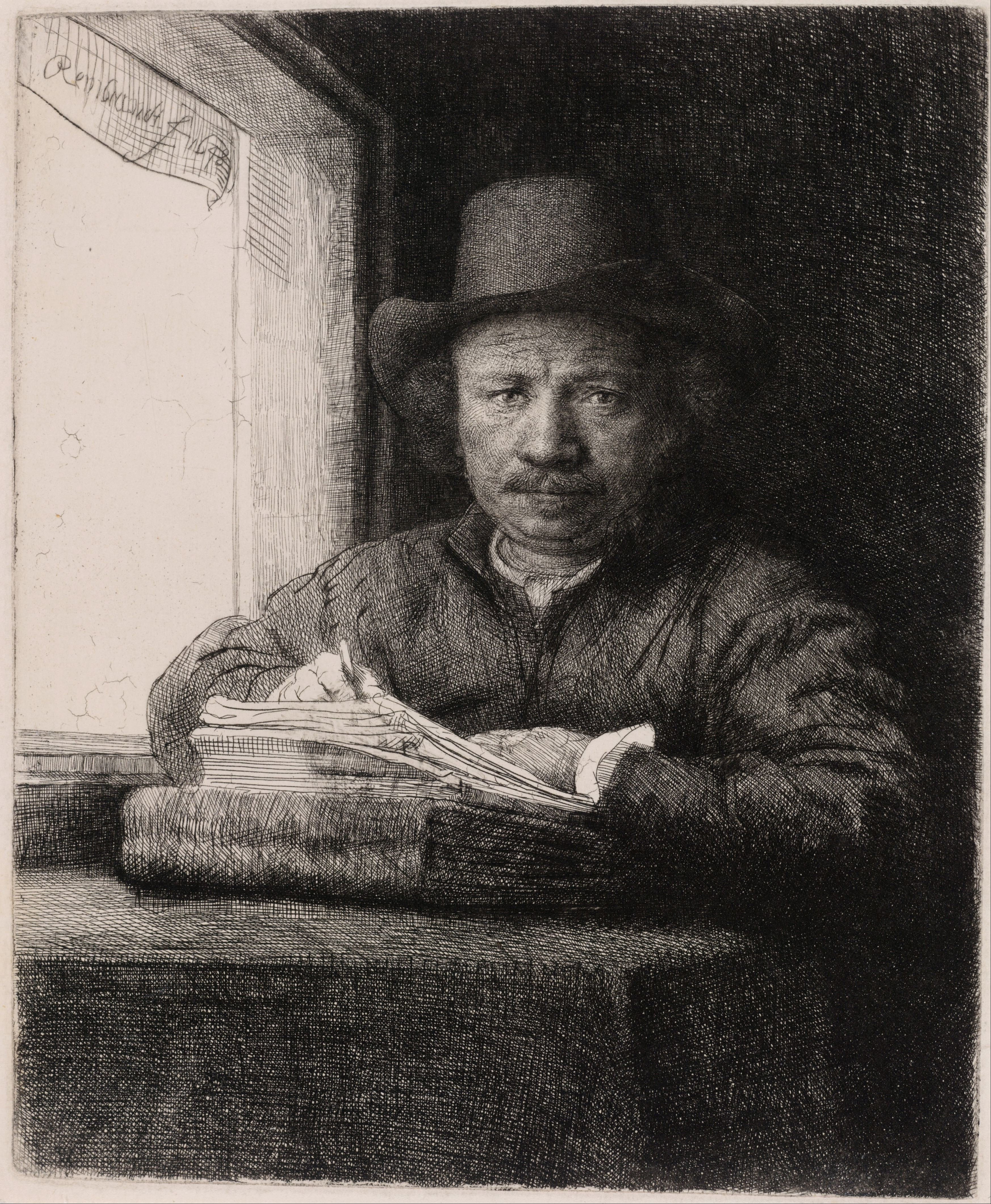
B22, Self Portrait Drawing at a Window, 1648, 5 states. He is drawing on an etching plate, making this the least posed self-portrait etching. In state iv, a landscape is added outside. The last etching but for two sketches, and one of the "official" etched self-portraits.

== Drawings ==
The number of drawings now accepted is far smaller, in single figures, and none of them seem to have functioned as preliminary studies for particular paintings or prints. The standing portrait, if indeed by it is Rembrandt, may have been done for someone else's "friendship album" (album amicorum); keeping these was common in artistic and literary circles. The Washington red chalk drawing, perhaps the most finished example, is close to the etching B2 in many ways; in both Rembrandt has a cadanette or long curling lock on one side. Since these were "exclusive to aristocratic circles", it was probably invented like a piece of costume.

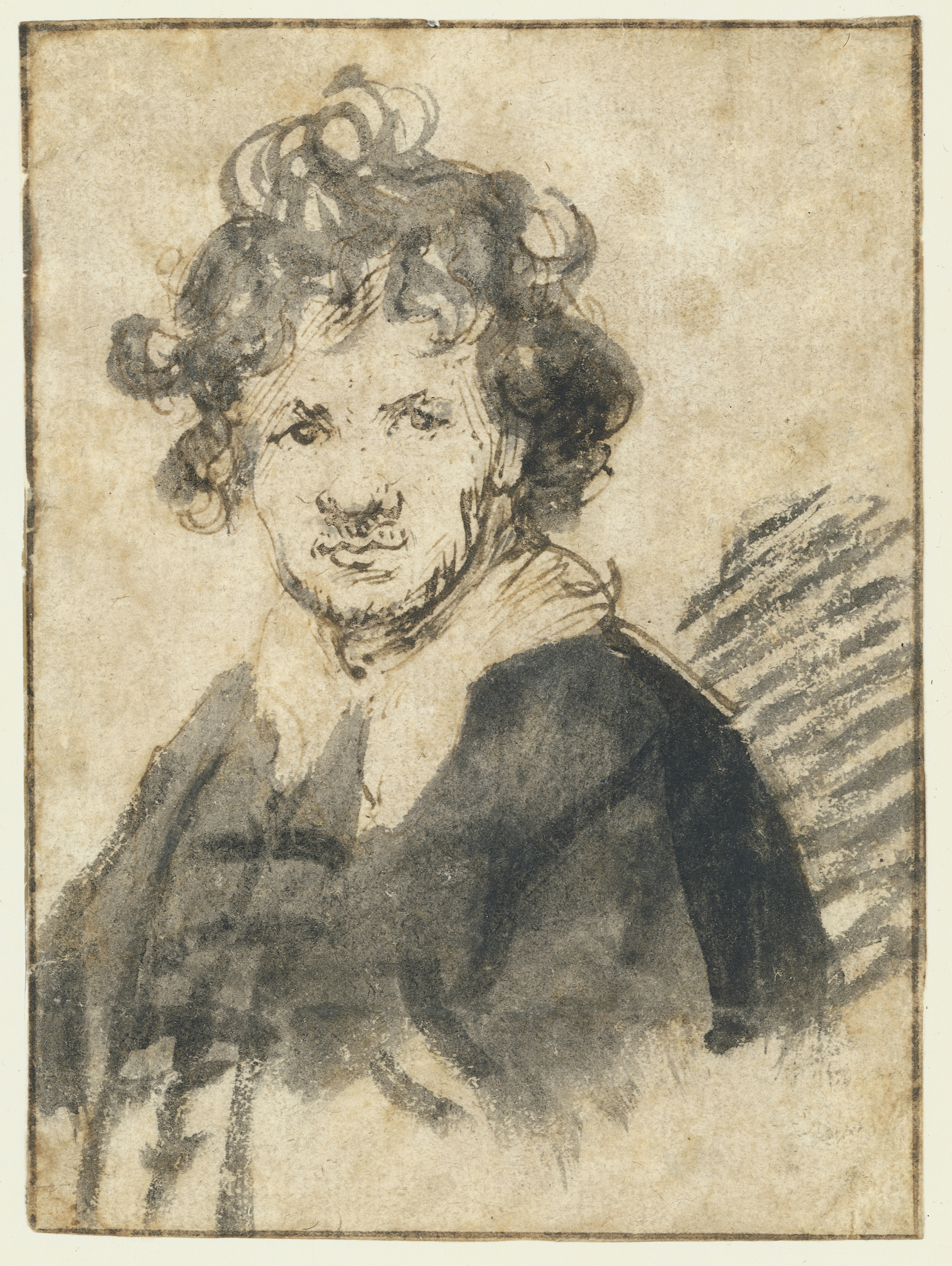
Self-portrait, pen and brush and ink on paper, c. 1628–1629, Rijksmuseum

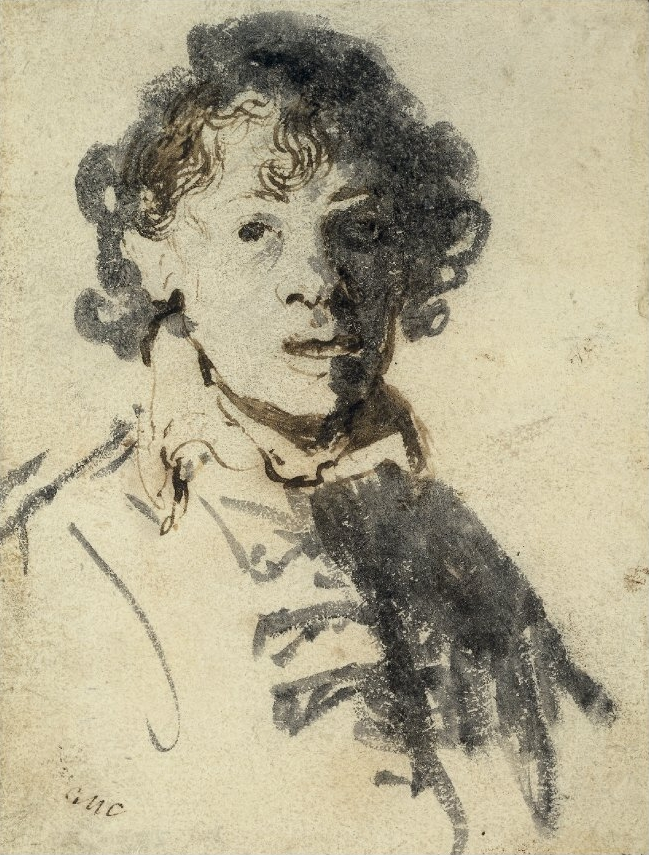
Self-portrait as a young man with mouth open, c. 1629, British Museum. It "emphasises what was to become the shameless, dominant feature of all Rembrandt's self-portraits, the nose."

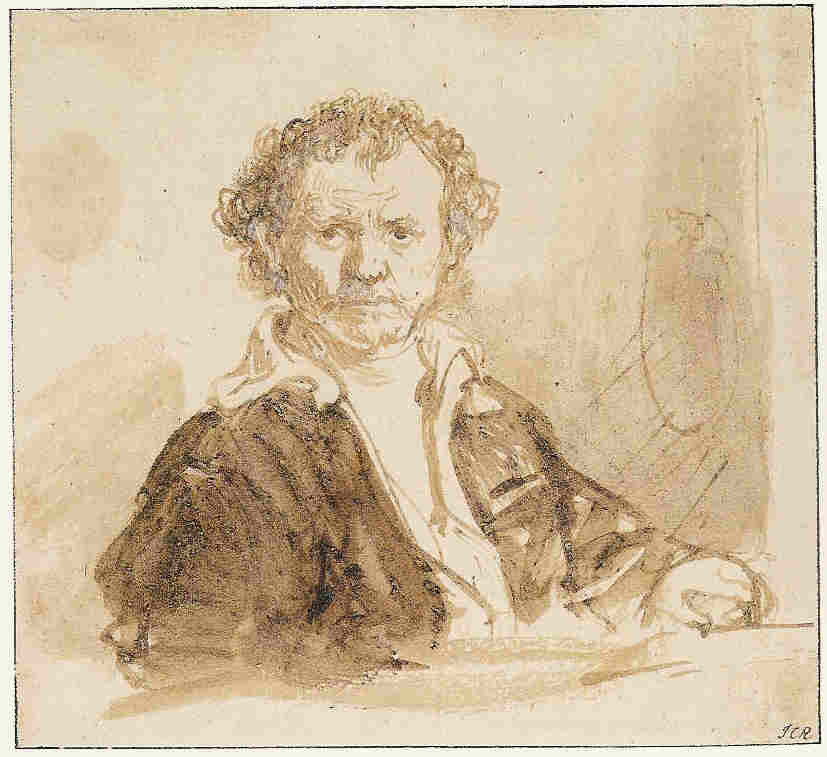
1636, Kupferstichkabinett Berlin, pen and brush in brown ink. The "highly informal mode of dress", with open shirt, is unique in his self-portraits.

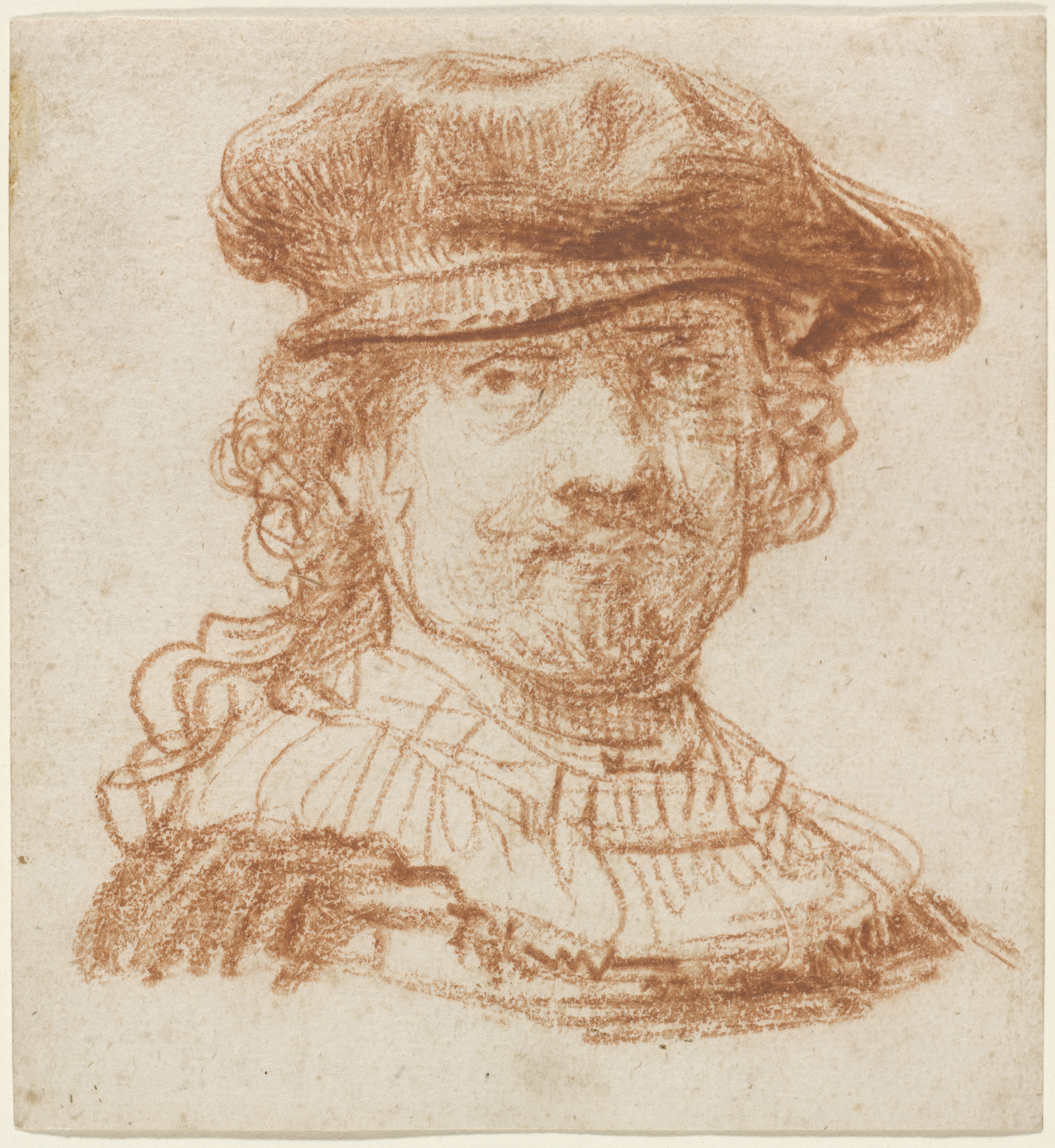
Red chalk, c. 1637, National Gallery of Art, Washington. The drawing seems to be done largely from the top down, without sharpening the chalk.

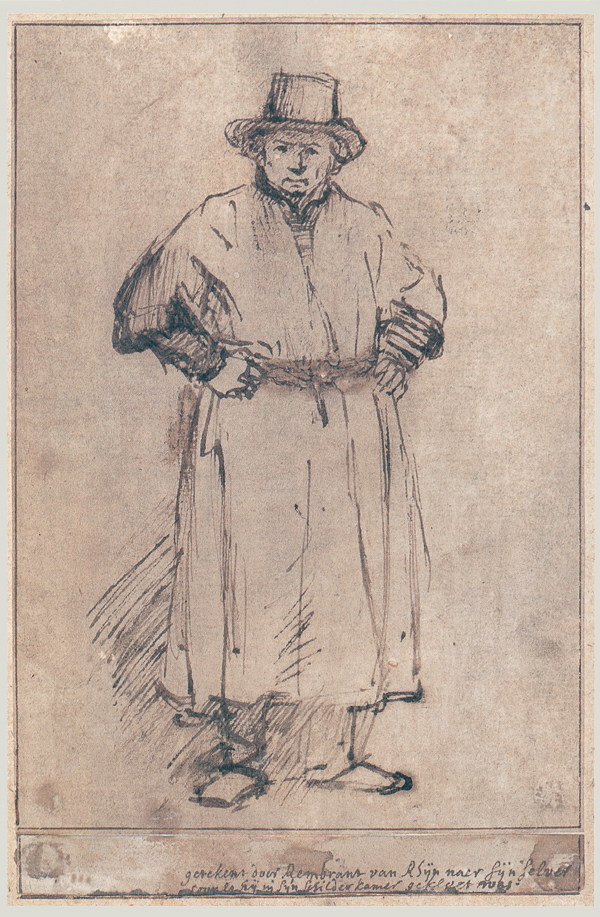
c. 1655, Rembrandthuis. Famous, but Ernst van de Wetering doubts it is authentic, instead copying B22 and a painting.

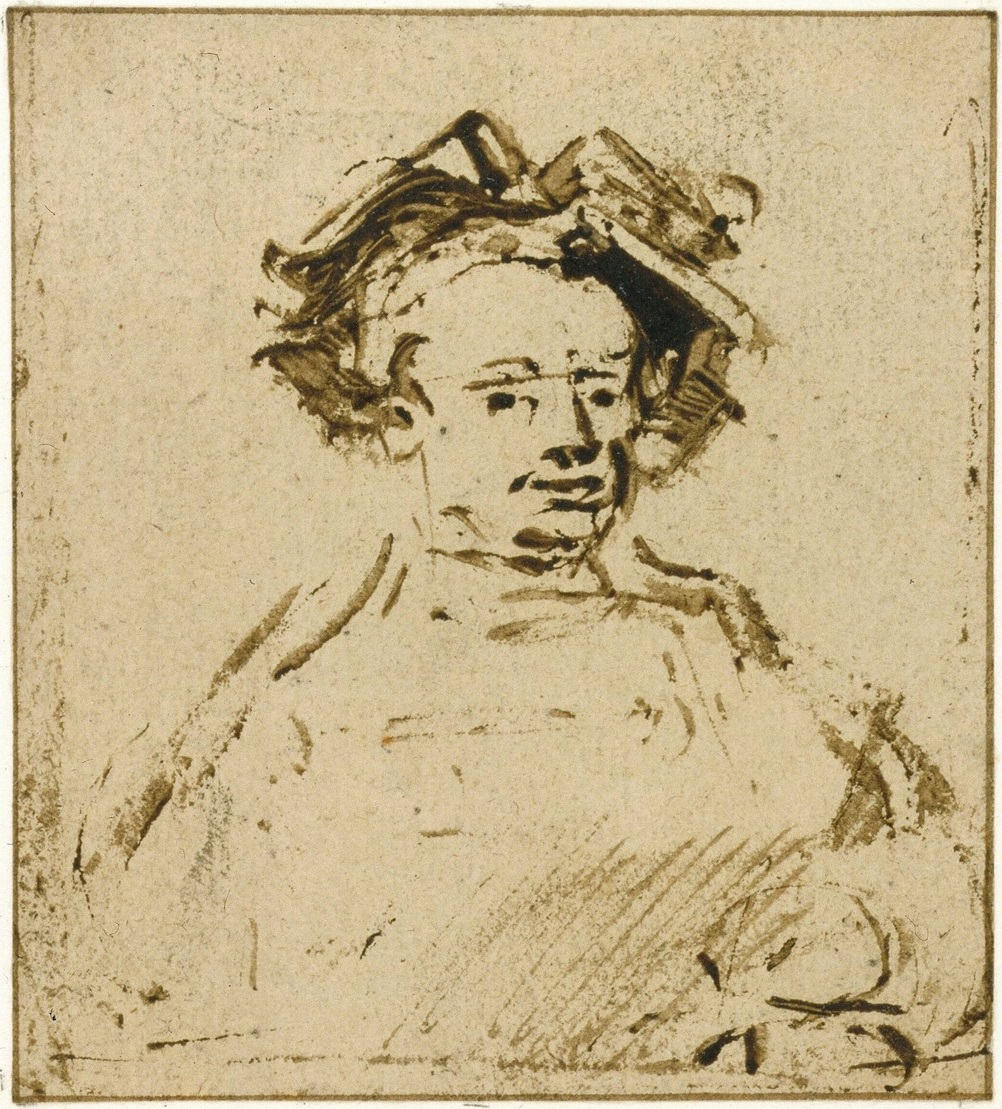
1657-58, Museum Boijmans Van Beuningen, Rotterdam

== On screen ==
A short film from 1956 by Bert Haanstra showed a chronological sequence of the paintings, with the eyes always in the same position, and the different images dissolving into each other. There is also Le miroir des paradoxes. Autoportraits, film by Alain Jaubert from the Palettes series (1991).

== See also ==
- Self-portraiture
- List of paintings by Rembrandt
- List of drawings by Rembrandt
- List of etchings by Rembrandt
- The Stoning of Saint Stephen, 1625, Museum of Fine Arts of Lyon, regarded as featuring Rembrandt's first self-portrait
- 'Tronie' of a Young Man with Gorget and Beret, Uffizi, Florence
- Rembrandt's prints
