= Rembrandt catalogue raisonné, 1968 =

Catalogue raisonné by Horst Gerson

The following is a list of paintings by Rembrandt in order of appearance (catalogue numbers 1–420), that were attributed as autograph by Horst Gerson in 1968.

Image	Title	Year	Technique	Dimensions (cm)	Gallery
	History Painting (Rembrandt)	1626	Oil on panel	90 x 122	Stedelijk Museum De Lakenhal, Leiden
	The Stoning of Saint Stephen	1625	Oil on panel	89.5 x 123.6	Musée des beaux-arts de Lyon
	David with the Head of Goliath before Saul	1626/1627	Oil on panel	27.2 x 39.6	Kunstmuseum Basel
	Tobit and Anna with the Kid	1626	Oil on panel	40.1 x 29.9	Rijksmuseum Amsterdam
	Christ Driving the Money-changers from the Temple	1624/1625	Oil on panel	43.1 х 32	Pushkin Museum, Moscow
	Balaam and the Ass	1626	Oil on panel	63.2 x 46.5	Musée Cognacq-Jay, Paris
	Nocturnal biblical scene	1626–28	Oil paint		Bridgestone Museum of Art
	The Flight into Egypt	1627	Oil on panel	27.5 x 24.7	Musée des Beaux-Arts de Tours
	Samson betrayed by Delilah	c. 1628–1630	Oil on panel	61.3 x 50.1	Gemäldegalerie, Berlin
	Simeon in the Temple	c. 1628	Oil on panel	55.4 x 43.7	Kunsthalle Hamburg
	Two Old Men Disputing	1628	Oil on panel	72.3 x 59.5	National Gallery of Victoria, Melbourne
	Judas Repentant, Returning the Pieces of Silver	1629	Oil on panel	79 x 102.3	private collection
	David playing the harp before Saul	c. 1630	Oil on panel	62 x 50	Städel, Frankfurt am Main
	The Supper at Emmaus	1629	Oil on panel	37.4 x 42.3	Musée Jacquemart-André, Paris
	The Tribute Money	1631	Oil paint		National Gallery of Canada, Ottawa
	The Raising of Lazarus	c. 1630–1632	Oil on panel	96.2 x 81.5	Los Angeles County Museum of Art
	Simeon's song of praise	1631	Oil on panel	60.9 x 47.9	Mauritshuis, The Hague
	Musical Company	1626	Oil on panel	63.4 x 47.6	Rijksmuseum Amsterdam
	The Parable of the Rich Fool	1627	Oil on panel	31.7 x 42.5	Gemäldegalerie, Berlin
	Artist in his studio	c. 1628	Oil on panel	24.8 x 31.7	Museum of Fine Arts, Boston
	A Man seated reading at a Table in a Lofty Room	c. 1630	Oil paint		National Gallery, London
	St. Paul in Prison	1627	Oil on panel	72.8 x 60.2	Staatsgalerie Stuttgart
	Saint Paul at his Writing Desk	c. 1629/1630	Oil on panel	47.2 x 38	Germanisches Nationalmuseum, Nuremberg
	Jeremiah Lamenting the Destruction of Jerusalem	1630	Oil on panel	58.3 x 46.6	Rijksmuseum Amsterdam
	Saint Peter in prison	1631	Oil on panel	59.1 x 47.8	Israel Museum, Jerusalem
	An Old Scholar Near a Window in a Vaulted Room	1631	Oil on panel	60.8 x 47.3	Nationalmuseum, Stockholm
	An Old Woman Reading, Probably the Prophetess Hannah	1631	Oil on panel	59.8 x 47.7	Rijksmuseum Amsterdam
	Man in a gorget and a plumed cap	1626	Oil on panel	40 x 29.4	private collection
	Head of an Old Man in a Cap	1630	Oil on panel	24.3 × 20.3	Agnes Etherington Art Centre, Kingston
	Self-portrait	1628	Oil paint		Schloss Wilhelmshöhe, Kassel
	Bust of a man with a cap (Rembrandt's father, Rembrandt's brother)	1630s	Oil paint		Schloss Wilhelmshöhe, Kassel
	Self-portrait Lit from the Left	1629	Oil on panel	15.5 x 12.7	Alte Pinakothek, Munich
	Bust of a laughing young man	c. 1630	Oil paint		Rijksmuseum Amsterdam
	An old woman reading	1631	Oil paint		private collection
	Bust of an old woman (Rembrandt's mother)	c. 1628	Oil paint		private collection
	Study of an old man (Rembrandt's father)	c. 1630	Oil on panel	46.9 x 38.8	Mauritshuis, The Hague
	Rembrandt's mother	c. 1629	Oil paint		Royal Collection at Windsor Castle
	Self-portrait with Plumed Beret	1629	Oil on panel	89.7 x 73.5	Isabella Stewart Gardner Museum, Boston
	Portrait of Rembrandt with a gorget	c. 1629	Oil paint		Mauritshuis, The Hague
	Self-portrait with Gold Chain	c. 1629–30	Oil paint		private collection
	Portrait of the Artist as a Young Man	c. 1630	Oil paint		Walker Art Gallery
	Bust of an Old Man in a Fur Cap	1629	Oil on panel	22.2 x 17.7	Tyrolean State Museum, Innsbruck
	Old Man in Prayer	1630s	Oil paint		Museum of Fine Arts, Boston
	Self-portrait 1630	1630	Oil on copper	15 x 12.2	Nationalmuseum, Stockholm
	Self-portrait	1630–1699	Oil paint		private collection
	Old Man with a Gold Chain	1631	Oil on panel	83.5 x 75.6	Art Institute of Chicago
	An Old Man in Military Costume	c. 1631	Oil on panel	66 x 50.8	J. Paul Getty Museum, Los Angeles
	Bust of an Old Man	c. 1631	Oil on panel	59.9 x 51.1	private collection
	Old Soldier	1630	Oil paint		Hermitage Museum, Saint Petersburg
	Bust of a man wearing a golden chain with a cross	1630–1731	Oil paint		Schloss Wilhelmshöhe, Kassel
	Bust of young man in gorget and plumed cap	1631	Oil paint		San Diego Museum of Art
	Young Man with a Plumed Hat	1631 – c. 1635	Oil on canvas	80.3 x 64.8	Toledo Museum of Art
	Nicolaes Ruts	1631	Oil on panel	116 x 87	Frick Collection, New York
	Portrait of a Man at a Writing Desk, possibly Jacob Bruyningh	1631	Oil on canvas	104.4 x 91.8	Hermitage Museum, Saint Petersburg
	Andromeda Chained to the Rocks	c. 1630	Oil on panel	34.5 x 25	Mauritshuis, The Hague
	Christ on the cross	1631	Oil, transferred from panel to canvas and then stuck on to panel		Parish Church, Le Mas d'Agenais
	The Rape of Proserpine	c. 1631	Oil on panel	84.8 x 79.7	Gemäldegalerie, Berlin
	A Young Woman (Esther? Bathsheba? Judith?) at her Toilet	1633	Oil on canvas	110.5 x 94.3	National Gallery of Canada, Ottawa
	Daniel and Cyrus Before the Idol Bel	1633	Oil on panel	23.4 x 30.1	J. Paul Getty Museum, Los Angeles
	The Storm on the Sea of Galilee	1633	Oil on canvas	160 x 128	Stolen from the Isabella Stewart Gardner Museum, Boston
	Diana Bathing with her Nymphs with Actaeon and Callisto	1634	Oil on panel	73.5 x 93.5	Museum Wasserburg, Anholt
	The Abduction of Europa	1632	Oil on panel	62.2 x 77	J. Paul Getty Museum, Los Angeles
	The Holy Family	1634	Oil on canvas	195 x 132	Alte Pinakothek, Munich
	Raising of the Cross	1633	Oil on canvas	95.7 x 72.2	Alte Pinakothek, Munich
	The Descent from the Cross	1632/1633	Oil on panel	89.6 x 65	Alte Pinakothek, Munich
	Descent from the Cross	1634	Oil on canvas	159.3 x 116.4	Hermitage Museum, Saint Petersburg
	The Incredulity of St Thomas	1634	Oil on panel	53 x 50	Pushkin Museum, Moscow
	Rest on the Flight into Egypt	1634	Oil on panel	52 x 40.1	private collection
	Artemisia	1634	Oil on canvas	142 x 153	Museo del Prado, Madrid
	Man in Oriental Costume (King Uzziah Stricken with Leprosy)	c. 1639/1640	Oil on panel	102.8 x 78.8	Chatsworth House
	John the Baptist Preaching	c. 1633/1634	Grisaille, canvas (enlarged) stuck on panel	62.7 x 81.1	Gemäldegalerie, Berlin
	Christ before Pilate (Ecce Homo)	1634	Grisaille, paper on canvas	54.5 x 44.5	National Gallery, London
	The Rape of Ganymede	1635	Oil on canvas	177 x 130	Staatliche Kunstsammlungen Dresden
	Abraham's Sacrifice	1635	Oil on canvas	193.5 x 132.8	Hermitage Museum, Saint Petersburg
	Tobias healing his blind father	c. 1636	Oil paint		Staatsgalerie Stuttgart
	The Blinding of Samson	1636	Oil on canvas	205 x 272	Städel, Frankfurt am Main
	Belshazzar's Feast	1635	Oil on canvas	167.6 x 209.2	National Gallery, London
	Samson threatened his father-in-law	c. 1635	Oil on canvas	159 x 131	Gemäldegalerie, Berlin
	The Prodigal Son in the Tavern	1635	Oil on canvas	161 x 131	Staatliche Kunstsammlungen Dresden
	The Ascension	1636	Oil on canvas	93 x 68.7	Alte Pinakothek, Munich
	Archangel Raphael leaves Tobit's House	1637	Oil on panel	66 x 52	Musée du Louvre, Paris
	The Risen Christ Appearing to Mary Magdalene	1638	Oil on panel	61 x 49.5	Royal Collection
	Parable of the Laborers in the Vineyard	1637	Oil on panel	31 x 42	Hermitage Museum, Saint Petersburg
	Susanna	1636	Oil on panel	47.2 x 38.6	Mauritshuis, The Hague
	The Wedding of Samson	1638	Oil on canvas	126 x 175	Staatliche Kunstsammlungen Dresden
	Joseph relating his dreams to his parents and brothers	1634	Grisaille, paper stuck on card	55.8 x 39.7	Rijksmuseum Amsterdam
	The Entombment	1635–1639	Oil on canvas	92.6 x 68.9	Alte Pinakothek, Munich
	The Resurrection	1639	Oil on canvas	92.9 x 67	Alte Pinakothek, Munich
	The lamentation over the dead Christ	c. 1633/1634	Grisaille, paper on canvas; enlarged by another hand on a panel measuring 31.9 x 26.7 cm.	31.9 x 26.7	National Gallery, London
	Minerva	c. 1631	Oil on panel	60.5 x 49	Gemäldegalerie, Berlin
	Philosopher in Meditation	1632	Oil on panel	28.2 x 34.4	Musée du Louvre, Paris
	Flora	1634	Oil on canvas	125 x 101	Hermitage Museum, Saint Petersburg
	A Scholar, Seated at a Table with Books	1634	Oil on canvas	145 x 134	National Gallery in Prague
	Minerva	1635	Oil on canvas	137 x 116	Gallery Otto Naumann, New York
	The Standard Bearer	1636	Oil on canvas	118.8 x 96.8	Collection of Elie de Rothschild, Paris
	Saskia as Flora in Arcadian Costume	1635	Oil on canvas	123.5 x 97.5	National Gallery, London
	Saint Francis of Assisi Praying	1637	Oil paint		Philadelphia Museum of Art
	Still Life with Peacocks	1639	Oil on canvas	145 x 135.5	Rijksmuseum Amsterdam
	Self-portrait as a Burger	1632	Oil on panel	64.4 x 47.6	Burrell Collection, Glasgow
	The Anatomy Lesson of Dr. Nicolaes Tulp	1632	Oil on canvas	169.5 x 216.5	Mauritshuis, The Hague
	A Young Man with a Chain	c. 1629–32	Oil paint		Cleveland Museum of Art
	Portrait of a Bearded Man	1632	Oil paint		Los Angeles County Museum of Art
	Man in Oriental Costume	1632	Oil on panel	152.7 x 111.1	Metropolitan Museum of Art, New York
	Portrait of Maurits Huygens (1595–1642)	1632	Oil on panel	31.1 x 24.5	Hamburger Kunsthalle
	Portrait of Jacob de Gheyn III	1632	Oil on panel	29.9 x 24.9	Dulwich Picture Gallery, London
	A Young Man Wearing a Turban	1631	Oil paint		Royal Collection Trust
	Bust of an old man with a bald head	c. 1630	Oil paint		Schloss Wilhelmshöhe, Kassel
	Portrait of a man, possibly Harder Rijcksen (na 1600–1637)	1632	Oil on panel	63 x 46	Suermondt-Ludwig-Museum, Aachen
	Study of an Old Man with a Gold Chain	1632	Oil on panel	59 x 46.5	Schloss Wilhelmshöhe, Kassel
	Portrait of Marten Looten	1632	Oil on panel	92.8 x 74.9	Los Angeles County Museum of Art
	Portrait of a Man Trimming his Quill	1632	Oil on canvas	101.5 x 81.5	Schloss Wilhelmshöhe, Kassel
	Portrait of Princess Amalia van Solms	1632	Oil on canvas	69.5 x 54.4	Musée Jacquemart-André, Paris
	Portrait of a young man with floppy pleated lace collar	1628-9	Oil paint		private collection
	Bust of a Young Woman in a Feathered Beret	1632	Oil on canvas mounted on panel	60.6 x 45	private collection
	Bust of a young woman	1632	Oil on panel	60.6 x 45	private collection
	Bust of a young woman	1632	Oil paint		Allentown Art Museum
	Portrait of a Young Woman	1632	Oil paint		Pinacoteca di Brera Milan
	Half-figure of a Young Woman in Profile with a Fan	1632	Oil on canvas	72.5 x 54.8	Nationalmuseum, Stockholm
	Portrait of a Man with Millstone Collar	1638	Oil on panel	63.5 x 47.3	Herzog Anton Ulrich Museum, Braunschweig
	Portrait of a Man, probably a Member of the Van Beresteyn Family	1632	Oil on canvas	112 x 89	Metropolitan Museum of Art, New York
	Portrait of a Woman, probably a Member of the Van Beresteyn Family	1632	Oil on canvas	112.5 x 88.8	Metropolitan Museum of Art, New York
	Portrait of a Man	1632	Oil on panel	75.6 x 52.1	Metropolitan Museum of Art, New York
	Portrait of a Woman	1633	Oil paint		Metropolitan Museum of Art, New York
	Portrait of Joris de Caullery	1632	Oil, canvas on panel	102.5 x 83.8	Fine Arts Museums of San Francisco
	Portrait of a forty-seven-year-old man, formerly called Aelbert Cuyper	c. 1632	Oil paint		Musée du Louvre, Paris
	Portrait of Cornelia Pronck	1633	Oil paint		Musée du Louvre, Paris
	Portrait of a 62-year-old Woman, possibly Aeltje Pietersdr Uylenburgh	1632	Oil on panel	73.5 x 55	private collection
	Portrait of a Woman Seated	1632	Oil on canvas	92 x 71	Academy of Fine Arts Vienna
	Self-portrait with Gold Chain	1633	Oil on panel	61 x 48.1	Musée du Louvre, Paris
	A Lady and Gentleman in Black	1632	Oil on canvas	131.5 x 109	Stolen from the Isabella Stewart Gardner Museum, Boston
	Richly-dressed Boy	1630-5	Oil paint		Hermitage Museum, Saint Petersburg
	Young Woman in Fantasy Costume (Saskia)	1633	Oil on panel	65 x 48	Rijksmuseum Amsterdam
	Self-portrait Transformed into a ‘tronie’	c. 1633–1636	Oil on panel	56 x 47	Gemäldegalerie, Berlin
	Bust of a Young Woman Smiling, possibly Saskia van Uylenburgh	1633	Oil on panel	52.5 x 44	Staatliche Kunstsammlungen Dresden
	Bust of an Old Man with a Beard and a Cap	1633	Oil paint		private collection
	Portrait of a Bearded Old Man	1633	Grisaille, paper on panel	10.6 x 7.2	private collection
	Portrait of Johannes Wtenbogaert	1633	Oil on canvas	123 x 105	Rijksmuseum Amsterdam
	Portrait of the Writer Jan Hermansz. Krul	1633	Oil on canvas	128.5 x 100.5	Schloss Wilhelmshöhe, Kassel
	Portrait of Jan Rijcksen and his Wife Griet Jans	1633	Oil on canvas	111 x 166	Royal Collection
	Portrait of a Man Rising from His Chair	1633	Oil on canvas	124 x 98.5	Taft Museum of Art, Cincinnati
	Portrait of a Young Woman with a Fan	1633	Oil on canvas	126.2 x 100.5	Metropolitan Museum of Art, New York
	Self-portrait Wearing a Toque and a Gold Chain	1633	Oil on panel	70.4 x 54	Musée du Louvre, Paris
	Young Woman with a Gold Chain	1634	Oil paint		Museo Nacional de Bellas Artes (Buenos Aires)
	Self-portrait as a young man	1639	Oil paint		Uffizi
	Bust of a boy with plumed beret	c. 1633	Oil paint		private collection
	Portrait of a Young Woman	1633	Oil on panel	63.5 x 47.5	Museum of Fine Arts, Houston
	Portrait of Willem Burggraeff, husband of Maertgen van Bilderbeecq	1633	Oil paint		Staatliche Kunstsammlungen Dresden
	Portrait of Maertgen van Bilderbeecq, Wife of Willem Burggraeff	1633	Oil paint		Städel
	Portrait of a Bearded Man in a Wide-Brimmed Hat, probably Pieter Seijen (1592–1652)	1633	Oil on panel	69.3 x 54.8	Norton Simon Museum, Pasadena
	Portrait of a 40-year-old Woman, possibly Marretje Cornelisdr van Grotewal	1634	Oil on panel	69 x 55	Speed Art Museum, Louisville
	Portrait of a Man Wearing a Red Doublet	1633	Oil on panel	63.5 x 50.5	private collection
	Man in Oriental Dress	1633	Oil on panel	85.8 x 63.8	Alte Pinakothek, Munich
	Portrait of a Man Seated	1632	Oil on panel	90.8 x 68.57	Kunsthistorisches Museum, Vienna
	Portrait of a Woman holding Gloves	1632	Oil on panel	90 x 68	Kunsthistorisches Museum, Vienna
	Portrait of a Woman	1633	Oil paint		private collection
	Portrait of an 83-year Old Woman (possibly Aechje Claesdr, mother of Dirck Jansz Pesser)	1634	Oil on panel	68.7 x 53.8	National Gallery, London
	Self-portrait with Helmet	1634	Oil paint		Schloss Wilhelmshöhe, Kassel
	Self-portrait in a Velvet Beret	1634	Oil on panel	58.3 x 47.5	Gemäldegalerie, Berlin
	Portrait of a Man Wearing a Black Hat	1634	Oil on panel	70 x 53	Museum of Fine Arts, Boston
	Portrait of a Woman Wearing a Gold Chain	1634	Oil on panel	69.5 x 53	Museum of Fine Arts, Boston
	Portrait of a boy with long hair	1634	Oil paint		private collection
	Reverend Johannes Elison	1634	Oil on canvas	173 x 123	Museum of Fine Arts, Boston
	Maria Bockenolle (Wife of Johannes Elison)	1634	Oil on canvas	174.5 x 123	Museum of Fine Arts, Boston
	Portrait of Maerten Soolmans	1634	Oil on canvas	207 x 132.5	joint ownership by Rijksmuseum and The Louvre
	Portrait of Oopjen Coppit	1634	Oil on canvas	207 x 132	joint ownership by Rijksmuseum and The Louvre
	Portrait of a Young Bachelor	1634	Oil on panel	70 x 52	Hermitage Museum, Saint Petersburg
	Portrait of a Woman	1634	Oil paint		Scottish National Gallery
	Portrait of Dirck Jansz. Pesser	1634	Oil on panel	71 x 53	Los Angeles County Museum of Art
	Portrait of Haesje Jacobsdr van Cleyburg	1634	Oil on panel	71 x 53	Rijksmuseum Amsterdam
	Man in Oriental Dress	1635	Oil on panel	72 x 54.5	Rijksmuseum Amsterdam
	Self-portrait wearing a white feathered bonnet	1635	Oil on canvas	90.5 x 71.8	Buckland Abbey
	Portrait of a Rabbi	1635	Oil on panel	72.5 x 62.1	Royal Collection
	Portrait of a man (Graphaeus)	c. 1635	Oil paint		private collection
	Saskia van Uylenburgh, the Wife of the Artist	c. 1640	Oil on panel	60.5 x 49	National Gallery of Art, Washington
	Saskia in a Red Hat	c. 1633–1642	Oil on panel	99.5 x 78.8	Schloss Wilhelmshöhe, Kassel
	Portraits of Jean Pellicorne and his Son Casper	1632	Oil on canvas	155 x 123	Wallace Collection, London
	Portraits of Susanna van Collen and her Daughter Anna	1632	Oil on canvas	153 x 121	Wallace Collection, London
	Portrait of Philips Lucasz. (....-1641)	1635	Oil on panel	79.5 x 58.9	National Gallery, London
	Portrait of Petronella Buys	1635	Oil on panel	private collection	
	Portrait of a Man in a Broad-Brimmed Hat	1635	Oil on canvas	78.5 x 65.7	Kawamura Memorial DIC Museum of Art, Sakura
	Portrait of a Young Woman (Cleveland)	1635	Oil on panel	78 x 65	Cleveland Museum of Art
	Man in Oriental Costume	c. 1633–1634	Oil on canvas	98 x 74	National Gallery of Art, Washington
	Portrait of Anthonie Coopal (1603–1672)	1635	Oil paint		Brooklyn Museum
	Half-length figure of a young woman in fanciful costume	1635-9	Oil paint		private collection Edmond de Rothschild
	Portrait of a 70-year-old Woman	c. 1640	Oil paint		Metropolitan Museum of Art, New York
	A Polish Nobleman	1637	Oil on panel	96.7 x 66.1	National Gallery of Art, Washington
	Portrait of a man in an armchair (Mertoun)	1637	Oil paint		private collection
	Portrait of a Young Man with a Golden Chain	1635	Oil paint		São Paulo Museum of Art
	Portrait of a man in a plumed hat	1637	Oil on panel	62.5 x 47	Mauritshuis, The Hague
	Portrait of an Old Woman	1639	Oil paint		Kunsthistorisches Museum
	A Dead Bittern (Botaurus stellaris, Dutch: Roerdomp)	1639	Oil on panel	120.7 x 88.3	Staatliche Kunstsammlungen Dresden
	Portrait of a Man Standing, possibly Andries de Graeff	1639	Oil on canvas	200 x 124.2	Schloss Wilhelmshöhe, Kassel
	Portrait of Aletta Adriaensdochter	1639	Oil on panel	64.7 x 55.3	Museum Boijmans Van Beuningen, Rotterdam
	Portrait of Maria Trip	1641(?)	Oil on canvas	107 x 82	Rijksmuseum Amsterdam
	Landscape with the Baptism of the Eunuch	c. 1640	Oil paint		Niedersächsisches Landesmuseum Hannover
	The Stone Bridge	c. 1638/1640	Oil on canvas	29.5 x 42.5	Rijksmuseum Amsterdam
	Landscape with Arched Bridge	1638	Oil paint		Gemäldegalerie, Berlin
	Landscape with Obelisk	1638	Oil paint		Isabella Stewart Gardner Museum
	Landscape with the Good Samaritan	1638	Oil on panel	46.5 x 66	Czartoryski Museum, Kraków
	Stormy Landscape	1640	Oil on panel	52 x 72	Herzog Anton Ulrich Museum, Braunschweig
	Wooded Landscape with a Ruin	c. 1650	Oil paint		private collection
	The Departure of the Shunammite Woman	1640	Oil paint		Victoria and Albert Museum
	The Visitation	1640	Oil on panel	56.5 x 47.8	Detroit Institute of Arts
	Manoah's Sacrifice	c. 1641	Oil paint		Staatliche Kunstsammlungen Dresden
	The Holy Family with St Anne	1640	Oil on panel	40.6 x 34	Musée du Louvre, Paris
	The concord of the state	1637	Oil on panel	74.6 x 101	Museum Boijmans Van Beuningen, Rotterdam
	David and Jonathan	1642	Oil on panel	73 x 61	Hermitage Museum, Saint Petersburg
	The Woman Taken in Adultery	1644	Oil on panel	83.8 x 65.4	National Gallery, London
	Tobit and Anna with the Kid	1645	Oil on panel	20 x 27	Gemäldegalerie, Berlin
	Joseph's dream	1645	Oil on panel	20.7 x 27.8	Gemäldegalerie, Berlin
	Holy Family with Angels	1645	Oil on canvas	117 x 91	Hermitage Museum, Saint Petersburg
	The Holy Family with Painted Frame and Curtain	1646	Oil on panel	46.8 x 68.4	Schloss Wilhelmshöhe, Kassel
	Bathsheba at her Toilette	1643	Oil paint		Metropolitan Museum of Art, New York
	Abraham Serving the Three Angels	1646	Oil on panel	16 x 21	private collection, Aurora trust, NY
	Adoration of the Shepherds	1646	Oil on canvas	92 x 71	Alte Pinakothek, Munich
	Adoration of the Shepherds	1646	Oil paint		National Gallery, London
	The Entombment of Christ	1633/1634	Grisaille, panel	32.1 x 40.3	Hunterian Museum and Art Gallery, Glasgow
	The Pilgrims of Emmaus	1648	Oil on panel	68 x 65	Musée du Louvre, Paris
	Supper at Emmaus	1648	Oil paint		Statens Museum for Kunst
	Nocturnal Landscape with the Holy Family resting on the flight into Egypt	1647	Oil on panel	33.8 x 47.8	National Gallery of Ireland, Dublin
	Susanna and the Elders	c. 1638–1647	Oil on panel	76.6 x 92.8	Gemäldegalerie, Berlin
	Biblical figure / Old Scholar in a Study	1642	Oil paint		Museum of Fine Arts Budapest
	Prophetess Anna in the Temple	1650 or c. 1646	Oil on panel	40.5 x 31.5	National Gallery of Scotland, Edinburgh
	Girl in a Picture Frame	1641	Oil on panel	104 x 76	Royal Castle, Warsaw
	Scholar at his desk	1641	Oil on panel	104 × 76	Royal Castle, Warsaw
	Saskia as Flora (Saskia holding a pink)	1641	Oil on panel	98.5 x 82.5	Staatliche Kunstsammlungen Dresden
	A Woman in Bed	1643	Oil on canvas	81.2 x 67.9	National Gallery of Scotland, Edinburgh
	Girl at a Window	1645	Oil on canvas	81.6 x 66	Dulwich Picture Gallery, London
	Self-portrait	c. 1639	Oil on panel	63 x 50.1	Norton Simon Museum, Pasadena
	Portrait of Herman Doomer	1640	Oil on panel	75.2 x 55.3	Metropolitan Museum of Art, New York
	Portrait of Baertje Martens	1640	Oil on panel	75.1 x 55.9	Hermitage Museum, Saint Petersburg
	Portrait of Nicolas van Bambeeck in a Picture Frame	1641	Oil on canvas	108.8 x 83.3	Royal Museums of Fine Arts of Belgium, Brussels
	Portrait of Agatha Bas	1641	Oil on canvas	104 x 82	Royal Collection
	Cornelis Claeszoon Anslo and his wife Aaltje Schouten	1641	Oil on canvas	176 x 210	Gemäldegalerie, Berlin
	Portrait of a Woman, possibly Anna Wijmer	1641	Oil on panel	99.5 x 81.5	Six Foundation, Amsterdam
	Self-portrait with beret, gold chain, and cross	after 1640	Oil paint		National Gallery of Canada, Ottawa
	Zelfportret van Rembrandt (Wallace Collection)	1637	Oil on panel	64 x 49	Wallace Collection, London
	Self-Portrait at the Age of 34	1640	Oil on canvas	93 x 80	National Gallery, London
	The Night Watch	1642	Oil on canvas	363 x 438	Rijksmuseum Amsterdam
	Self-portrait wearing a Hat and two Chains	c. 1640	Oil on panel	72.2 x 58.3	Thyssen-Bornemisza Museum, Madrid
	Half figure of a woman (Saskia)	1643	Oil on panel	72 x 59	Gemäldegalerie, Berlin
	Bust of a Man with Beard and Beret	c. 1643	Oil paint		Hermitage Museum, Saint Petersburg
	Boaz	1643	Oil on panel	72.5 x 58.5	Woburn Abbey
	Man with a Sword and Beret	1644	Oil paint		private collection
	Portrait of a man with gloves in hand	1648	Oil paint		Metropolitan Museum of Art, New York
	Portrait of a Standing Man	c. 1640-5	Oil paint		private collection
	Seated old man with a cane in fanciful costume	1645	Oil on canvas	128 x 112	Museu Calouste Gulbenkian, Lisbon
	Young Woman at an Open Half-Door	1645	Oil paint		Art Institute of Chicago
	Portrait of a Seated Woman with a Handkerchief	1644	Oil paint		Art Gallery of Ontario
	Portrait of a man, possibly Pieter Six	c. 1651	Oil on canvas	92.5 x 73.5	Faringdon Collection, Oxfordshire
	Portrait of a man (pendant of 'Adriaentje Hollaer')	c. 1642	Oil paint		private collection
	Portrait of Adriaantje Hollaer	c. 1642	Oil paint		private collection
	Self-Portrait (Royal Collection)	1642	Oil on panel	69.9 x 58.4	Royal Collection
	Old Man with Fur Coat	1645	Oil on panel	110 x 82	Gemäldegalerie, Berlin
	Head of Christ	c. 1650	Oil paint		Bredius Museum
	Head of Christ	1648	Oil on panel	25.5 x 20.1	Louvre Abu Dhabi
	Head of Christ	c. 1648–54	Oil paint		Detroit Institute of Arts
	Head of Christ	1650s	Oil paint		Metropolitan Museum of Art, New York
	Old man with beard looking right	1647	Oil paint		Dutch Institute for Cultural Heritage
	Bust of a Young Jew	after 1657	Oil paint		Gemäldegalerie, Berlin
	The Man with the Golden Helmet	1650	Oil paint		Gemäldegalerie, Berlin
	Self-portrait with Beret and Red Cloak	c. 1645/1648	Oil on panel	73.5 x 59.6	Staatliche Kunsthalle Karlsruhe
	Portrait of a man, thought to be Dr. Ephraïm Bueno	c. 1647	Oil on panel	19 x 15	Rijksmuseum Amsterdam
	Old Lady with a Book	1637	Oil paint		National Gallery of Art, Washington
	Landscape with a Church	1640s	Oil paint		private collection
	Landscape with a Coach	c. 1640	Oil paint		Wallace Collection, London
	Winter Landscape	1646	Oil on panel	17 x 23	Schloss Wilhelmshöhe, Kassel
	Landscape with castle	1645	Oil on panel	44.5 x 70	Musée du Louvre, Paris
	Christ Appearing to Mary Magdalene, ‘Noli me tangere’	1650 or slightly later	Oil on canvas	65 x 79	Herzog Anton Ulrich Museum, Braunschweig
	Danaë	c. 1636 – c. 1643	Oil on canvas	185 x 203	Hermitage Museum, Saint Petersburg
	Bathsheba at Her Bath	1654	Oil on canvas	142 x 142	Musée du Louvre, Paris
	Christ and the Woman of Samaria	1659	Oil paint		Gemäldegalerie, Berlin
	Christ with the woman of Samaria	1655	Oil paint		Metropolitan Museum of Art, New York
	Potiphars wife before her husband accusing Joseph	1655	Oil on canvas	110 x 87	Gemäldegalerie, Berlin
	Joseph Accused by Potiphar's Wife	1655	Oil paint		National Gallery of Art, Washington
	The Tribute Money	1655	Oil paint		private collection
	Jacob Blessing the Sons of Joseph	1656	Oil on canvas	175 x 210.5	Schloss Wilhelmshöhe, Kassel
	Philemon and Baucis	1658	Oil, transferred from panel to gauze and then stuck on a new panel	54.5 x 68.5	National Gallery of Art, Washington
	Young Woman with Earrings	1638	Oil on panel	23.9 x 32.5	Hermitage Museum, Saint Petersburg
	Portrait of a man in military costume	1650	Oil paint		Fitzwilliam Museum
	Portrait of a woman in military costume	1650	Oil paint		John and Mable Ringling Museum of Art
	King David	1651	Oil paint		private collection
	Portrait of a Seated Old Man Wearing a Red Hat	c. 1654	Oil on canvas	52.4 x 37	Gemäldegalerie, Berlin
	A Girl with a Broom	1651	Oil paint		National Gallery of Art, Washington
	The Kitchen Maid	1651	Oil on canvas	78 x 63	Nationalmuseum, Stockholm
	Aristotle Contemplating a Bust of Homer	1653	Oil on canvas	141.8 x 134.4	Metropolitan Museum of Art, New York
	The Polish Rider	c. 1655	Oil on canvas	116.8 x 134.9	Frick Collection, New York
	Flora	c. 1660	Oil on canvas	100 x 91.8	Metropolitan Museum of Art, New York
	A Woman bathing in a Stream (Hendrickje Stoffels?)	1654	Oil on panel	61.8 x 47	National Gallery, London
	Slaughtered Ox	c. 1640	Oil paint		Kelvingrove Art Gallery and Museum
	Slaughtered Ox	1655	Oil on panel	95.5 x 69	Musée du Louvre, Paris
	An Old Woman Reading (formerly Prophetess Hannah)	1655	Oil on canvas	79 x 65	Drumlanrig Castle, Thornhill
	Olimpiadi	c. 1657	Oil on canvas	118 x 91	Museu Calouste Gulbenkian, Lisbon
	Man in Armour	c. 1655	Oil on canvas	137.5 x 104.5	Kelvingrove Art Gallery and Museum, Glasgow
	The Apostle Paul at his Writing Desk	1657	Oil on canvas	129 x 102	National Gallery of Art, Washington
	St. Bartholomew	1657	Oil on canvas	122.7 x 99.5	Timken Museum of Art, San Diego
	Man with a Beard	c. 1657	Oil paint		Gemäldegalerie, Berlin
	Portrait of a Man as the Apostle Paul	1659	Oil on canvas	102 x 85.5	National Gallery, London
	An Old Man in Fanciful Costume	1651	Oil on canvas	78.5 x 67.5	Chatsworth House
	A Franciscan Friar	c. 1655	Oil paint		National Gallery, London
	Rembrandt leaning on a Windowsill	1650	Oil paint		Taft Museum of Art
	Portrait of an Old Man	1654	Oil paint		Pushkin Museum
	Portrait of an Old Woman	1654	Oil paint		Pushkin Museum
	Study of an old man	1650	Oil paint		Mauritshuis, The Hague
	An Old Man in an Armchair	1652	Oil on canvas	111 x 88	National Gallery, London
	Half-length portrait of a man with beard and headscarf under his hat	1651	Oil paint		private collection
	Portrait of Nicolaes Bruyningh	1652	Oil on canvas	106.8 × 91.5	Schloss Wilhelmshöhe, Kassel
	Self Portrait	1652	Oil on canvas	112.1 x 81	Kunsthistorisches Museum, Vienna
	Portrait of Jan Six (1618–1700)	1654	Oil on canvas	112 x 102	Six Foundation, Amsterdam
	Self portrait with black baret and golden chain	1654	Oil on canvas	72 x 58.5	Schloss Wilhelmshöhe, Kassel
	Portrait of a Young Woman in a Fantasy Costume	c. 1654	Oil on canvas	72 x 60	Musée du Louvre, Paris
	Portrait of an Old Woman	1654	Oil paint		Hermitage Museum, Saint Petersburg
	Portrait of an Old Man	1654	Oil paint		Hermitage Museum, Saint Petersburg
	Portrait of an Old Man in Red by Rembrandt	1654	Oil paint		Hermitage Museum, Saint Petersburg
	Portrait of an Old Woman	c. 1653	Oil paint		Pushkin Museum
	Man in a Fur-lined Coat	1656	Oil on canvas	115 x 88.3	Toledo Museum of Art
	Portrait of Floris Soop	1654	Oil on canvas	138 x 113	Metropolitan Museum of Art, New York
	Half length figure of a woman in fanciful costume	c. 1653	Oil paint		private collection
	Unfinished Portrait of a Boy	c. 1656	Oil on canvas	65 x 56	Norton Simon Museum, Pasadena
	Self portrait in a fur coat with gold chain and earring	1655	Oil paint		Kunsthistorisches Museum
	Head of Christ	1650s	Oil paint		Philadelphia Museum of Art
	Head of Christ	c. 1656	Oil paint		Fogg Museum
	Head of Christ	c. 1648	Oil on panel	25 x 20	Gemäldegalerie, Berlin
	Self-portrait	c. 1657	Oil on panel	48.9 x 40.2	Kunsthistorisches Museum, Vienna
	Titus at his desk	1655(?)	Oil on canvas	77 x 63	Museum Boijmans Van Beuningen, Rotterdam
	The anatomy lesson of Dr. Joan Deyman	1656	Oil on canvas	100 x 134	Amsterdam Museum
	Portrait of a Man, possibly Arnout Tholincx	1656	Oil on canvas	76 x 63	Musée Jacquemart-André, Paris
	Man in a Beret	1670s	Oil paint		Metropolitan Museum of Art, New York
	Self-portrait aged 51	1657/1659	Oil on canvas	50 x 42.5	National Gallery of Scotland, Edinburgh
	Portrait of Titus van Rijn	1657	Oil on canvas	67.3 x 55.2	Wallace Collection, London
	A Young Woman Holding a Carnation	1656	Oil paint		Statens Museum for Kunst
	Portrait of a Rabbi	1657	Oil paint		Fine Arts Museums of San Francisco
	Portrait of an Old Man in a Cape	c. 1650-5	Oil paint		Fogg Museum
	A Bearded Man in a Cap	1657	Oil paint		National Gallery, London
	Titus Reading (study in direct and reflected light)	c. 1660/1665	Oil on canvas	70.5 x 64	Kunsthistorisches Museum, Vienna
	Portrait of Catrina Hoogsaet	1657	Oil on canvas	123.5 x 95	Penrhyn Castle, Gwynedd
	Portrait of a Young Woman	1668	Oil on canvas	56 x 47	Montreal Museum of Fine Arts
	Portrait of a Man	1650s	Oil paint		Metropolitan Museum of Art, New York
	Hendrickje Stoffels by a door	c. 1654	Oil on canvas	88.5 x 67	Gemäldegalerie, Berlin
	Portrait of a Scholar (The Auctioneer)	1658	Oil on canvas	108 x 85	Metropolitan Museum of Art, New York
	Portrait of a Man with a Letter	1658	Oil paint		private collection
	Portrait of a foreign admiral	1658	Oil on canvas	107.4 x 87	private collection
	Self Portrait	1658	Oil on canvas	131 x 102	Frick Collection, New York
	Landscape with ruins and windmill	c. 1637 – c. 1645	Oil on panel	67 x 87.5	Schloss Wilhelmshöhe, Kassel
	Landscape with cottages	1654	Oil paint		Montreal Museum of Fine Arts
	Jacob Wrestling with the Angel	c. 1659	Oil on canvas	137 x 116	Gemäldegalerie, Berlin
	Moses Smashing the Tablets of the Law	1659	Oil on canvas	168.5 x 136.5	Gemäldegalerie, Berlin
	Tobit and Anna	1659	Oil on canvas	41.8 x 54.6	Museum Boijmans Van Beuningen, Rotterdam
	Christ and the Woman of Samaria	1659	Oil paint		Hermitage Museum, Saint Petersburg
	The Circumcision	1661	Oil on canvas	56.5 x 75	National Gallery of Art, Washington
	Ahasuerus and Haman at the Feast of Esther	Between c. 1655 and 1665	Oil on canvas	71.5 х 93	Pushkin Museum, Moscow
	The Pilgrims of Emmaus 1660	1660-1	Oil paint		Musée du Louvre, Paris
	The Denial of Saint Peter	1660	Oil on canvas	154 x 169	Rijksmuseum Amsterdam
	The Conspiracy of Claudius Civilis	c. 1661–1662	Oil on canvas	196 x 309	Nationalmuseum, Stockholm
	The Return of the Prodigal Son	c. 1660/1665	Oil on canvas	262 x 206	Hermitage Museum, Saint Petersburg
	The Jewish Bride	c. 1665	Oil on canvas	121.5 x 166.5	Rijksmuseum Amsterdam
	Haman Recognizes his Fate	1648–1665	Oil paint		Hermitage Museum, Saint Petersburg
	Simeon in the Temple	1669	Oil on canvas	98.5 x 79.5	Nationalmuseum, Stockholm
	Saint Matthew and the Angel	1661	Oil on canvas	96 x 81	Musée du Louvre, Paris
	The Risen Christ	c. 1658	Oil on canvas	81 x 64	Alte Pinakothek, Munich
	St. James the Greater praying	1661	Oil on canvas	92.1 x 74.9	Whereabouts unknown
	Apostle Simon	1661	Oil on canvas	98.5 x 79	Kunsthaus Zürich
	The Man with the Red Cap	1660–1665	Oil paint		Museum Boijmans Van Beuningen, Rotterdam
	Evangelist Writing	1660–1665	Oil paint		Museum of Fine Arts, Boston
	An Elderly Man in Prayer	1660-5	Oil paint		Cleveland Museum of Art
	St. Bartholomew	1661	Oil on canvas	87.5 x 75	J. Paul Getty Museum, Los Angeles
	Elderly woman with a rosary	1661	Oil on canvas	107 x 81	Musée départemental d'Art ancien et contemporain, Epinal
	Christ with Arms Folded	1657–61	Oil paint		The Hyde Collection
	Christ with a Staff	1661	Oil on canvas	94.5 x 81.5	Metropolitan Museum of Art, New York
	The Knight with the Falcon	c. 1661	Oil on canvas	98.5 x 79	Gothenburg Museum of Art
	Homer Dictating his Verses	1663	Oil on canvas	108 x 82.4	Mauritshuis, The Hague
	Lucretia	1666	Oil on canvas	111 x 95	Minneapolis Institute of Arts
	Lucretia	1664	Oil paint		National Gallery of Art, Washington
	Juno	c. 1657–1665	Oil on canvas	127 x 106	Hammer Museum, Los Angeles
	Portrait of Titus van Rijn	1668	Oil on canvas	72 x 56	Musée du Louvre, Paris
	Self Portrait with Beret and Turned-Up Collar	1659	Oil on canvas	84.4 x 66	National Gallery of Art, Washington
	Titus as a Monk	c. 1660	Oil on canvas	79.5 x 67.5	Rijksmuseum Amsterdam
	Head of Christ	c. 1648–55	Oil paint		Brigham Young University Museum of Art
	Study of an Old Man with a Beard	1659	Oil on panel	38.1 x 26.8	Daniel and Linda Bader Collection, Milwaukee
	Self Portrait with Two Circles	c. 1665/1669	Oil on canvas	114.3 x 94	Kenwood House, London
	Rembrandt: Self Portrait	1660	Oil on canvas	81 x 67.6	Metropolitan Museum of Art, New York
	Hendrickje Stoffels (1626–1663)	c. 1660	Oil on canvas	78.4 x 68.9	Metropolitan Museum of Art, New York
	Portrait of Jacob Trip	c. 1661	Oil on canvas	130.5 x 97	National Gallery, London
	Portrait of Margaretha de Geer	c. 1661	Oil on canvas	130.5 x 97	National Gallery, London
	The Small Margaretha de Geer	1661	Oil on canvas	73.5 x 60.7	National Gallery, London
	Monk Reading	1661	Oil paint		Finnish National Gallery
	Head of a Bearded Old Man	c. 1657	Oil paint		Daniel and Linda Bader Collection, Milwaukee
	Portrait of a Seated Old Woman with Clasped Hands	1661	Oil paint		private collection
	Self-portrait at the easel 1660	1660	Oil on canvas	110.9 x 90.6	Musée du Louvre, Paris
	Two moors	1661	Oil on canvas	77.8 x 64.5	Mauritshuis, The Hague
	Old Man in an Armchair, possibly a portrait of Jan Amos Comenius	c. 1665	Oil on canvas	104 x 86	Uffizi, Florence
	Portrait of a Young Man in an Armchair	c. 1660–65	Oil paint		Memorial Art Gallery, George Eastman Collection of the University of Rochester, N.Y.
	Portrait of Jan Boursse, Sitting by a Stove	c. 1666	Oil on panel	47 x 40.5	Museum Oskar Reinhart ‘Am Römerholz’, Winterthur
	Portrait of a Young Man with Beard and Skullcap	1663	Oil on canvas	65.8 x 57.5	Kimbell Art Museum, Fort Worth
	Head of a Man in a Turban	c. 1661	Oil on panel	24.8 x 19.1	Agnes Etherington Art Centre, Kingston
	Hendrickje with Fur Wrap	c. 1652	Oil on canvas	103.3 x 86.5	National Gallery, London
	Portrait of a man	1661	Oil paint		Saint Louis Art Museum
	Portrait of a Woman with a Lapdog	c. 1665	Oil on canvas	81 x 64	Art Gallery of Ontario, Toronto
	Self-portrait	1669	Oil on canvas	71 x 54	Uffizi, Florence
	Portrait of Dirck van Os	c. 1658	Oil on canvas	113.5 x 88.7	Joslyn Art Museum, Omaha
	Portrait of a Man in a Tall Hat	1663	Oil paint		National Gallery of Art, Washington
	Half-length figure of a man with beard and beret	1661	Oil paint		Hermitage Museum, Saint Petersburg
	Self-portrait as the Apostle Paul	1661	Oil on canvas	93.2 x 79.1	Rijksmuseum Amsterdam
	Syndics of the Drapers' Guild	1662	Oil on canvas	191.5 x 279	Rijksmuseum Amsterdam
	A Young Man Seated at a Table (possibly Govaert Flinck)	c. 1656	Oil on canvas	109.9 x 89.5	National Gallery of Art, Washington
	Portrait of a Young Man, possibly Titus	1663	Oil paint		Dulwich Picture Gallery
	Portrait of Gerard de Lairesse	1665	Oil on canvas	112 x 87	Metropolitan Museum of Art, New York
	Youth with a Black Cap	c. 1662	Oil on canvas	80 x 64.7	Nelson-Atkins Museum of Art, Kansas City
	Portrait of an Elderly Man	1667	Oil on canvas	81.9 x 67.7	Mauritshuis, The Hague
	Frederick Rihel on Horseback	1663	Oil on canvas	294.5 x 241	National Gallery, London
	Portrait of a Gentleman with a Tall Hat and Gloves	c. 1656	Oil on canvas	99.5 x 82.5	National Gallery of Art, Washington
	Portrait of a Lady with an Ostrich-Feather Fan	c. 1656	Oil on canvas	99.5 x 83	National Gallery of Art, Washington
	Portrait of Jeremias de Decker	1656	Oil on panel	71 x 56	Hermitage Museum, Saint Petersburg
	Portrait of a white-haired man	1667	Oil on canvas	108.9 x 92.7	National Gallery of Victoria, Melbourne
	Self-Portrait at the Age of 63	1669	Oil on canvas	86 x 70.5	National Gallery, London
	Portrait of a family	c. 1665	Oil on canvas	126 x 167	Herzog Anton Ulrich Museum, Braunschweig
	Man with a Magnifying Glass	1665	Oil on canvas	91.4 x 74.3	Metropolitan Museum of Art, New York
	Woman with a Pink Carnation	1665	Oil on canvas	92.1 x 74.6	Metropolitan Museum of Art, New York
	Self-portrait as Zeuxis Laughing	1663	Oil on canvas	82.5 x 65	Wallraf-Richartz Museum, Cologne
	Self-portrait 1669	1669	Oil on canvas	63.5 x 57.8	Mauritshuis, The Hague

== See also ==
- List of paintings by Rembrandt

== Sources ==
- Rembrandt Paintings, by Horst Gerson, Meulenhoff International, 1968, OCLC 716640208
