= Rembrandt catalogue raisonné =

Rembrandt catalogue raisonné may refer to the following lists of paintings:

- Rembrandt catalogue raisonné, 1908, by Adolf Rosenberg and Wilhelm Reinhold Valentiner
- Rembrandt catalogue raisonné, 1935, by Abraham Bredius
- Rembrandt catalogue raisonné, 1968, by Horst Gerson
- Rembrandt catalogue raisonné, 1986, by Christian Tümpel
