= Rembrandt Research Project =

Project to research Rembrandt works

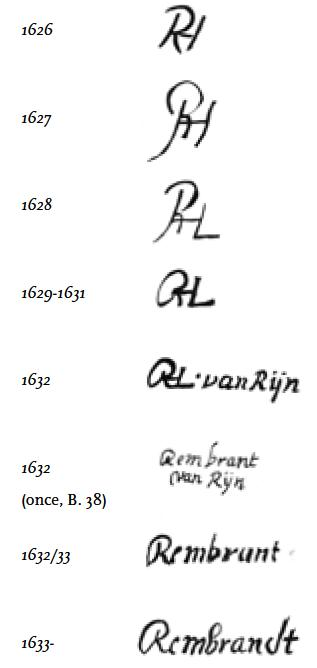
Signatures by Rembrandt published by the Rembrandt Research Project

The Rembrandt Research Project (RRP) was an initiative of the Dutch Research Council (NWO). Its purpose was to organize and categorize research on Rembrandt van Rijn, with the aim of discovering new facts about this Dutch Golden Age painter and his studio. The project started in 1968 and consisted of the following team of art historians: Josua Bruyn, Bob Haak, Simon H. Levie, Pieter J. J. van Thiel, and Ernst van de Wetering. The older members of the team resigned in 1993 and the project was sponsored by NWO until 1998, but research continued until 2014 under the sole direction of Ernst van de Wetering. The RRP was considered the authority on Rembrandt's paintings and its opinion weighed heavily on whether a painting was to be considered genuine or not. The documentation generated by the project was transferred to the Netherlands Institute for Art History and renamed the Rembrandt Database.

== Results ==
As a result of the project, which analyzed documentation, techniques, and forensic research on Rembrandt paintings from his early years in Leiden until his death, the number of signed Rembrandt self-portraits around the world has been reduced by half. Also, more paintings have been attributed to students working in the Rembrandt studio, and more has been discovered about the ways in which the students worked. Toward the end of the project period copies of Rembrandt paintings were being studied for clues as to whether certain copies were factory-style pieces for visiting functionaries. Rembrandt's work was in high demand for decades, and he managed to keep productivity up while also keeping his prices high by enforcing strict quality control on the work done in his studio.

The project's six-volume publication, A Corpus of Rembrandt Paintings, is considered the definitive reference by all auction houses and dealers who work with works by Rembrandt and his studio. The research project has proved invaluable to art historians, but it has also initiated debate about the feasibility of conclusive attribution, particularly for painters who were associated with one or more workshops.

=== Publications ===
- A Corpus of Rembrandt Paintings in six volumes:

Volume I, 1629–1631, 1982, J. Bruyn, B. Haak, S. H. Levie, P. J. J. van Thiel, and E. van de Wetering
Volume II, 1621–1634, 1986,J. Bruyn, B. Haak, S. H. Levie, P. J. J. van Thiel, and E. van de Wetering
Volume III, 1635–1642, 1989, J. Bruyn, B. Haak, S. H. Levie, P. J. J. van Thiel, and E. van de Wetering
Volume IV, Self-Portraits, E. van de Wetering (ed.), 2005
Volume V, The Small-Scale History Paintings, E. van de Wetering (ed.), 2010
Volume VI, Rembrandt’s Paintings Revisited, A Complete Survey, E. van de Wetering (ed.), 2014

== Concordance with other Rembrandt catalogs ==
The research project is also the single point of reference regarding concordance with other catalogs of the master's works, though most of these reference each other, as well. Below is a partial list of some commonly quoted catalogs:

- Catalogue extracted from the Register L R. fol. 29 to 39 inclusive, of the Inventory of the Effects of Rembrandt Van Rhyn, deposited in the Office of the Administration of Insolvent Estates at Amsterdam, 1656 (published in English by Smith, 1836)
- Beredeneerde catalogus der werken van Rembrandt van Rhyn, en van zyne leerlingen en navolgers, herkomende uit het kabinet van wylen den heer C. Ploos van Amstel, J.Cz., welke in het openbaar zullen verkogt worden (Sale catalog of works sold from the collection of Cornelis Ploos van Amstel on Tuesday 31 July 1810), C. Josi, Amsterdam 1810
- A catalogue raisonné of the works of the most eminent Dutch, Flemish, and French painters : in which is included a short biographical notice of the artists, with a copious description of their principal pictures; a statement of the prices at which such pictures have been sold at public sales on the continent and in England; a reference to the galleries and private collections, in which a large portion are at present; and the names of the artists by whom they have been engraved; to which is added, a brief notice of the scholars & imitators of the great masters of the above schools, Volume 7 on "Rembrandt van Rhyn", by Smith, John, dealer in pictures, 1836
- Rembrandt, 8 volumes, by Wilhelm von Bode with Cornelis Hofstede de Groot, 1897–1905
- Rembrandt : des Meisters Gemälde in 643 Abbildungen, by Wilhelm Reinhold Valentiner and Adolf Rosenberg, 1908
- Beschreibendes kritisches Verzeichnis der Werke der hervorragendsten Holländischen Mahler des XVII. Jahrhunderts (1907–1928), Volume 6 Rembrandt, by Hofstede de Groot, 1914
- Rembrandt Paintings, by Abraham Bredius, 1935
- Rembrandt : Gemälde, by Kurt Bauch, 1966
- Rembrandt, by Bob Haak, 1968
- Rembrandt, by Horst Gerson, 1968
- Rembrandt : the complete edition of the paintings, a reworking of the Bredius 1935 list by Gerson with explicitly rejected attributions and re-attributions, 1969
- L' opera pittorica completa di Rembrandt, by Paolo Lecaldano, 1969
- Rembrandt, by Christian Tümpel, 1986
- Rembrandt : catalogo completo dei dipinti, by Leonard J. Slatkes, 1992
- The Rembrandt Book, by Gary Schwarz, 2006

== End ==
In early 2011, the RRP board voted to terminate the project by the end of 2011 even though approximately one-quarter of Rembrandt's oeuvre has not yet been investigated. A major reason for this decision was the lack of scholars available to assume responsibilities from the RRP's chair, Ernst van de Wetering, who has been involved with the project since 1968. Other reasons cited included lack of funding, as the Netherlands Organisation for Scientific Research ceased funding the project in 1998. Funding from the Mellon Foundation, the Netherlands Institute for Art History and the Mauritshuis launched a pilot initiative called the Rembrandt Database to supplement research from the RRP.

A sixth and final volume of the project's Corpus, in which van de Wetering sums up his forty years of research, was published in 2014.

== See also ==
- Ernst van de Wetering, chair of the Rembrandt Research Project
- Bob Haak, founder of the Rembrandt Research Project
- John Smith, wrote the first catalog raisonné of Rembrandt paintings in 1836
- Hofstede de Groot, wrote a comprehensive update of Smith's catalog in 1914
- Abraham Bredius, wrote his first catalog of Rembrandt paintings in 1935
- Horst Gerson, first wrote his own catalog in 1968, followed by the first revision of Bredius's catalog in 1969
- Christian Tümpel, wrote a comprehensive update of Gerson's catalog in 1986
- List of paintings by Rembrandt, based on the 2014 (final?) list of the RRP published in A Corpus of Rembrandt Paintings, Volume VI
- List of Rembrandt pupils
