= Christ with a Staff =

Painting by a follower of Rembrandt

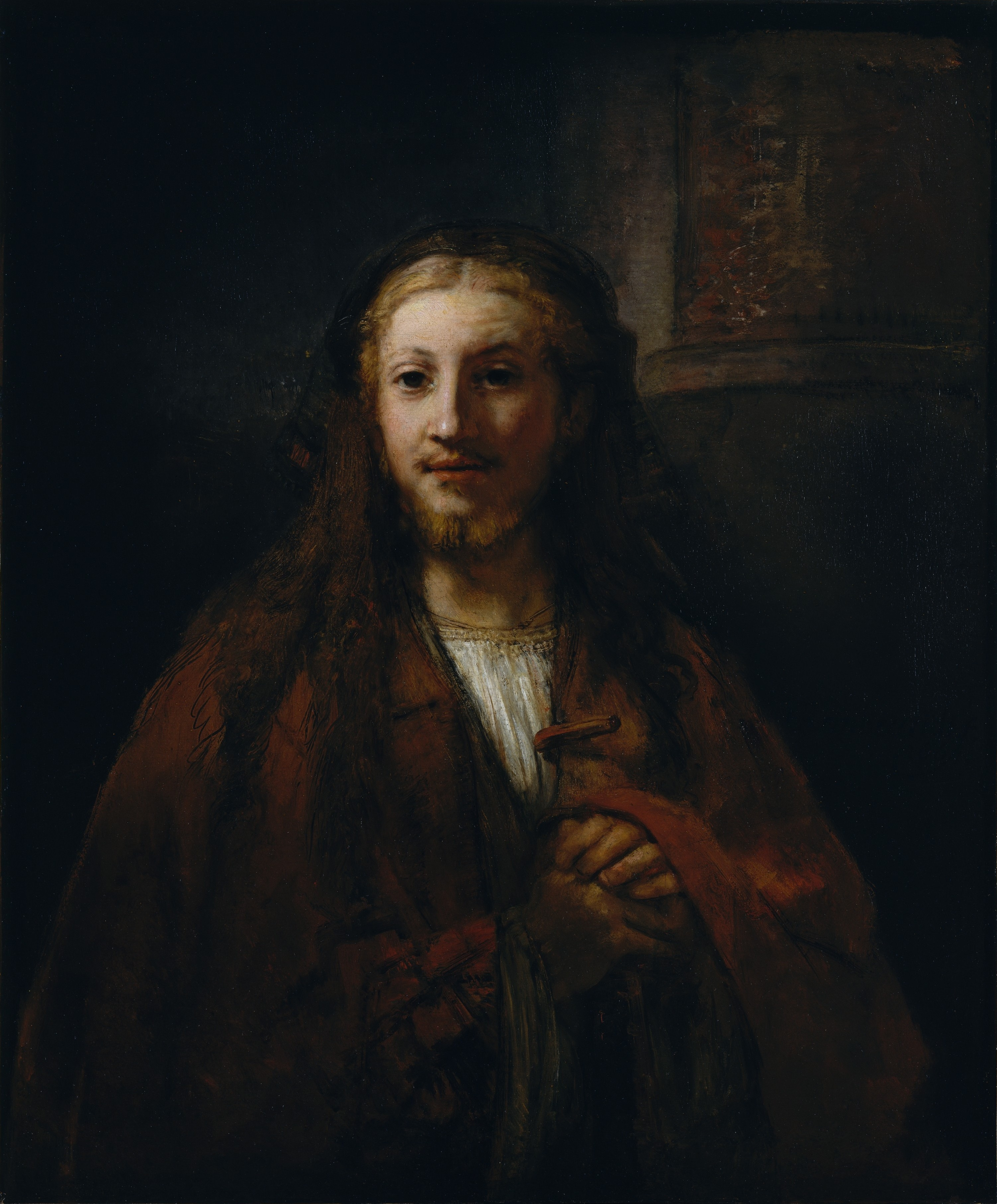
Christ with a Staff (1660s)

Christ with a Staff or St James the Less is a painting by a follower of Rembrandt, now in the Metropolitan Museum of Art. It was also known as Christ in 1854 and exhibited in 1933 as The Pilgrim.

The picture is in Rembrandt's style of the 1660s and may have been painted in his workshop. Whilst the brushwork certainly imitates his unique style, some scholars have suggested that its manner of execution is similar to that of Arent de Gelder (1645–1727), one of his latter pupils.

In 1661 Rembrandt made a series of paintings of the apostles, including Self-Portrait as the Apostle Paul; these may have influenced this work. In an image by the copper-plate engraver Schelte a Bolswert, after a drawing by Gerard Seghers, St James the Less is shown with a book.

== Provenance ==
The work is first mentioned in 1836, when it was in the collection of Christopher Bethell-Codrington. When his estate was auctioned on 12 May 1843 it was sold for £252 to the art dealer Christianus Johannes Nieuwenhuys. On 11 December 1854 it was sold at auction for 13,000 francs to count Raczyński from the collection of Baron de Mecklembourg in Paris. In 1898 it was owned by Edward Aleksander Raczyński in Poznań. A year after his death it was sold for $150,000 to Duveen Brothers, an art dealer, who resold it later that year to Jules Bache in New York for $300,000. Bache left it to its present owner.

== See also ==
- List of paintings by Rembrandt
