= Horst Gerson =

German-Dutch art historian (1907–1978)

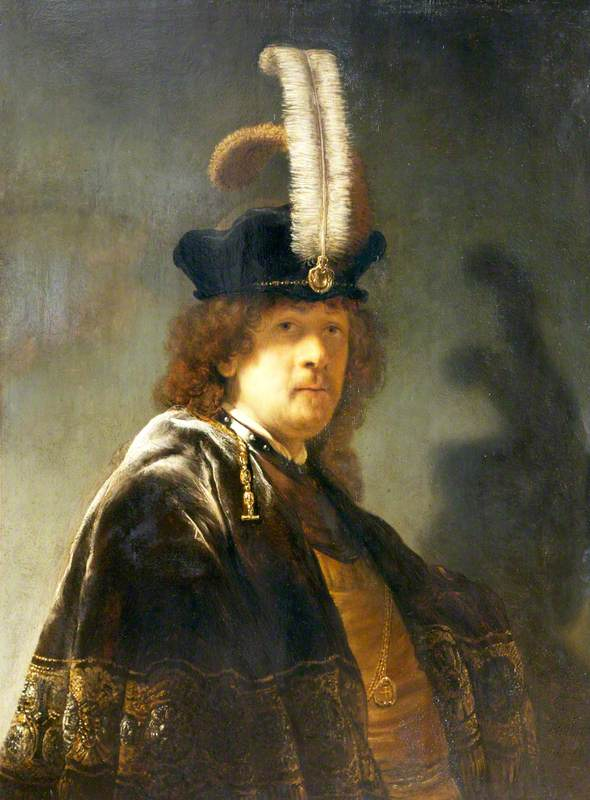
Rembrandt self-portrait in Buckland Abbey

Horst Gerson (2 March 1907 – 10 June 1978) was a German-Dutch art historian.

== Biography ==
Gerson was born in Berlin on 2 March 1907, and after studying art history in Vienna, he became a pupil and assistant of Cornelis Hofstede de Groot and worked for de Groot's RKD (Netherlands Institute for Art History) during the years 1934–1966, becoming a Dutch citizen in 1940 and becoming director of the RKD on 1 January 1954. He was the nephew of Karl Lilienfeld, who had assisted de Groot before him. In 1966 he became professor of art history at the Rijksuniversiteit Groningen, and during the years 1966–1975 he was head of the Kunsthistorisch Instituut Groningen. He is known for his publications, starting with his 'Ausbreitung und Nachwirkung der holländischen Malerei des 17. Jahrhunderts' published in 1942.

He assisted Abraham Bredius with his Rembrandt catalogue raisonné, and later wrote his own version in 1968 which reduced the number of attributed Rembrandt works from 639 to 420, and the next year published a revision of Bredius's catalogue that reduced the number even further. The Rembrandt Research Project (RRP) under the direction of Ernst van de Wetering systematically went through the Gerson papers and re-attributed paintings to Rembrandt, most notably the self-portrait wearing a white feathered bonnet in Buckland Abbey. The last installment of the RRP's 'Corpus of Rembrandt paintings' published in 2014 included 348 paintings, of which 295 were included in Gerson's 1968 catalog.

Other books include, with E.H. ter Kuile covering architecture and sculpture, the chapters on painting in Art and Architecture in Belgium, 1600-1800 in the Pelican History of Art (1960, Penguin Books).

Gerson was elected a member of the Royal Netherlands Academy of Arts and Sciences in 1969.

He died in Groningen on 10 June 1978.
