= Self-Portrait as the Apostle Paul =

1661 painting by Rembrandt

Self-portrait as the Apostle Paul
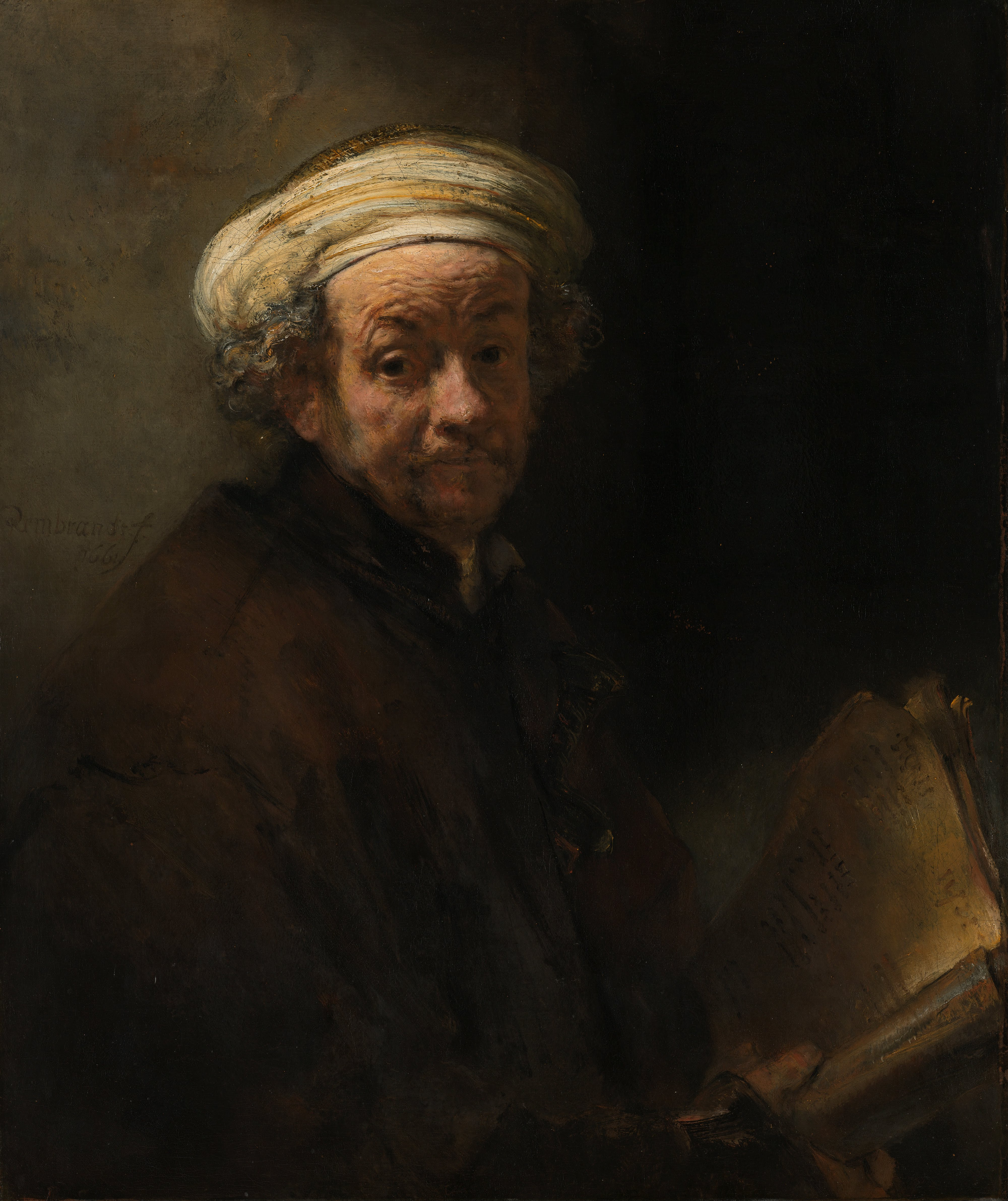
- Artist: Rembrandt
- Year: 1661
- Medium: Oil on canvas
- Dimensions: 93.2 cm × 79.1 cm (36.7 in × 31.1 in)
- Location: Rijksmuseum, Amsterdam

Self-portrait as the Apostle Paul (Dutch: Zelfportret als de apostel Paulus, also known as Self-portrait as St. Paul), is a 1661 oil on canvas painting by the Dutch artist Rembrandt, one of his over 40 known self-portraits.

The painting is signed and dated "Rembrandt.f./1661" near the sitters left-hand shoulder. Art historians believe that Rembrandt used the wet-on-wet painting technique in creating the painting's visual affects. The portrait is held in the Rijksmuseum in Amsterdam.

This painting is part of the BBC's 100 Great Paintings.

== Stylistic elements ==
According to Ernst Van de Wetering, the painting may have been made with the wet-on-wet technique. Rembrandt demonstrates further refinement with the distribution of light and dark elements within the figure and the background image. He shows great control over the variation of brushstrokes. The rapid paint strokes within the turban stand in contrast with the impasto method seen on the lit forehead of the figure. This method accentuates the light present on Apostle Paul’s face, creating the appearance of wrinkles set on his forehead. Van de Wetering notes that these elements all further the impression of space within the portrait. Rembrandt plays with different stylistic choices, such as movement, to enhance the viewers’ perception of light. The pages, for example, are slightly curled at the top which is further emphasized by the light. This portion of the book contrasts the rolled leather that remains in the shadows of the painting, highlighting Rembrandt’s use of space and light. The rolled leather of the book also differs from the rest of the painting's coloristic elements, as the blueish-gray strokes stand out from the otherwise cohesive brown and beige palette.

Van de Wetering speculates that Rembrandt may have based his likeness in this work on earlier self-portraits instead of looking at a mirror. The pose and facial features in this work resemble those found in earlier works, suggesting that they may have served as references.

== Self-portrait historié ==
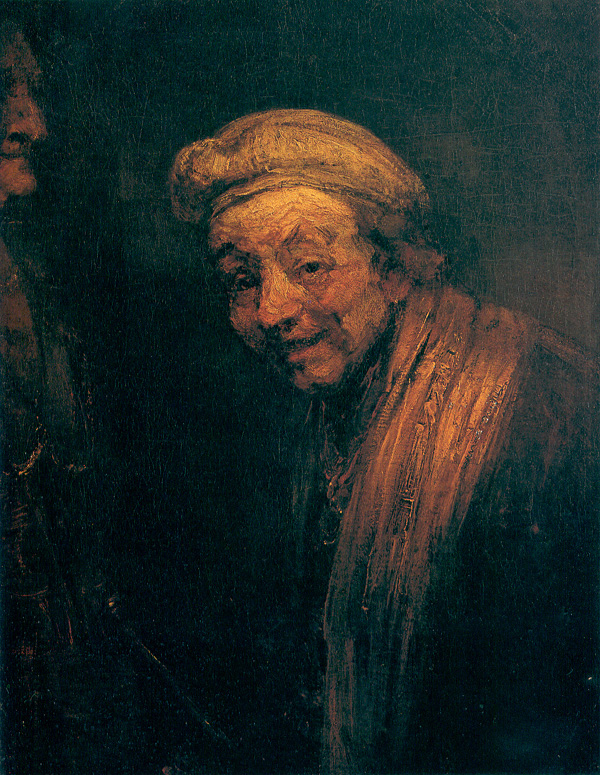
Self-portrait historié: Self-portrait as Zeuxis

Saint Paul is identifiable through the sword under his arm and a manuscript in his hand, which were traditional attributes of the apostle. Rembrandt's depiction of himself as St. Paul is an approach referred to as self-portrait historié, where artists disguise themselves as renowned historical or religious figures. These types of works were especially popular during the 1660s. Rembrandt has one other self-portrait historié, the Self-portrait as Zeuxis.

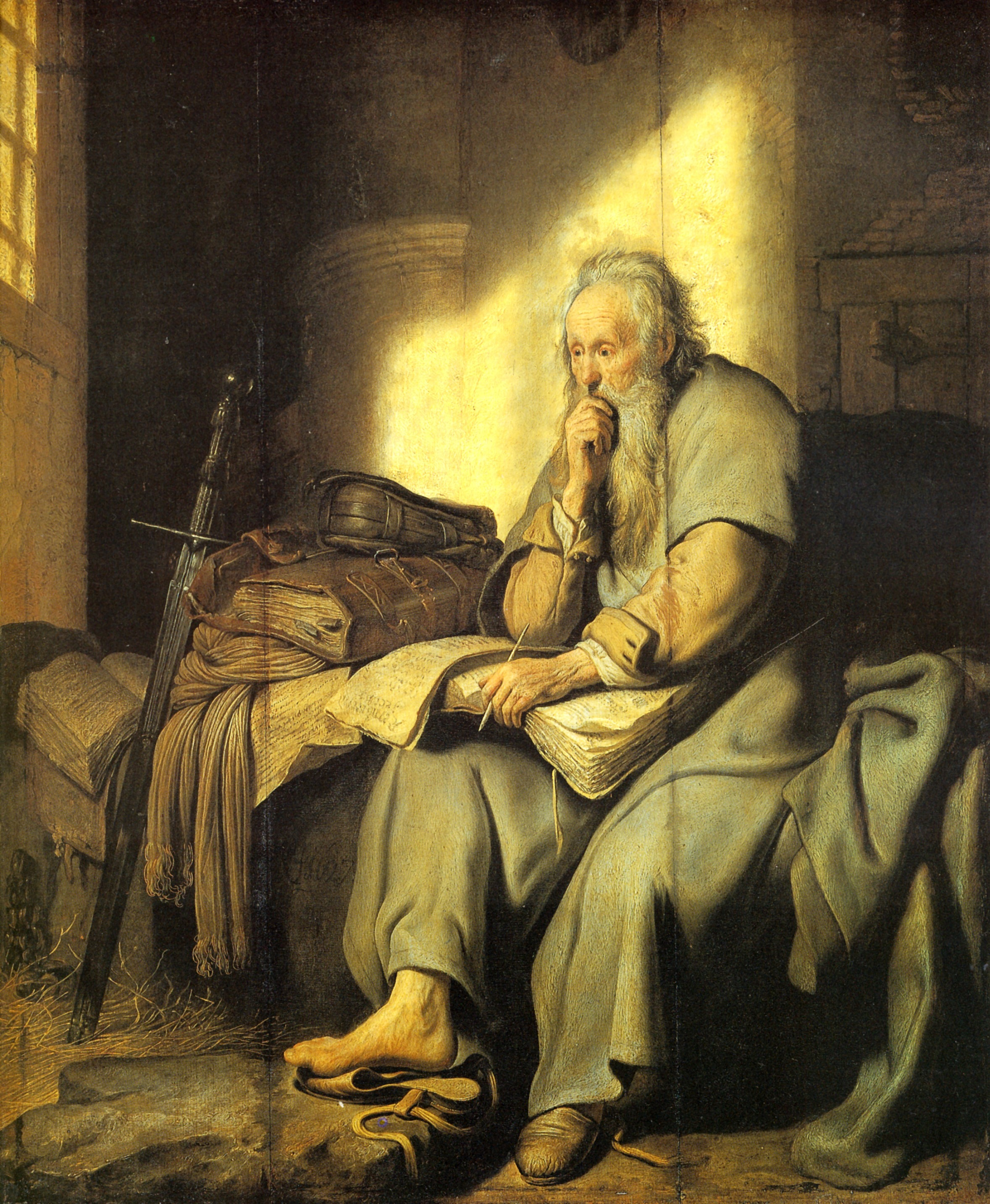
Rembrandt, Saint Paul in Prison, 1627

Self-portrait as the Apostle Paul is not Rembrandt's only painting of St. Paul. He first depicted St. Paul as early as 1627, 34 years before the completion of Self-portrait as the Apostle Paul. While Rembrandt has various paintings with St. Paul as the subject, Self-portrait as the Apostle Paul is unique in how St. Paul is depicted. In previous paintings, such as the 1627 Saint Paul in Prison, Rembrandt painted the apostle with a long beard and receding hairline. The Self-portrait as the Apostle Paul more closely resembles Rembrandt's other self-portraits.

== Rembrandt's affinity for St. Paul ==
Art historians believe that Rembrandt’s choice to depict himself as the Apostle Paul rather than using a model was likely deliberate, not simply a matter of convenience. Models were in no short supply, and finding a model with the physical features that Rembrandt desired would not have been challenging. Rembrandt's decision to use himself as the model may have been due to his feelings of kinship with the apostle. This kinship was partly rooted in his religious affiliation. During the 17th century, the Apostle Paul was prominent in the Protestant religion. Rembrandt's identification with Paul may have also stemmed from the apostle's role as a religious teacher, which Rembrandt may have seen as paralleling his own use of art as a means of explicating scripture.

== Bibliography ==
- Christian Tümpel: Rembrandt. Rowohlt Taschenbuch Verlag, Reinbek 2006. ISBN 3-499-50691-2.
- Michael Kitson: Rembrandt. Phaidon Press Inc., New York City 2007. ISBN 9780714827438.
- Ernst Van de Wetering: A corpus of Rembrandt Paintings: Self-portraits (IV), The Rembrandt Database (pp. 541–550). Springer, Netherlands 2005.
- Christopher White & Quentin Buvelot: Rembrandt by himself. National Gallery Publications; Royal Cabinet of Paintings Mauritshuis. Yale University Press 1999.
