= Musée départemental d'Art ancien et contemporain =

Museum in Épinal, Vosges, France

Coordinates: 48.1728°N 6.4464°E

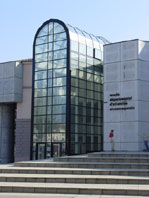

The Musée départemental d'Art ancien et contemporain is a museum in Épinal, Vosges, France.

== Collection ==
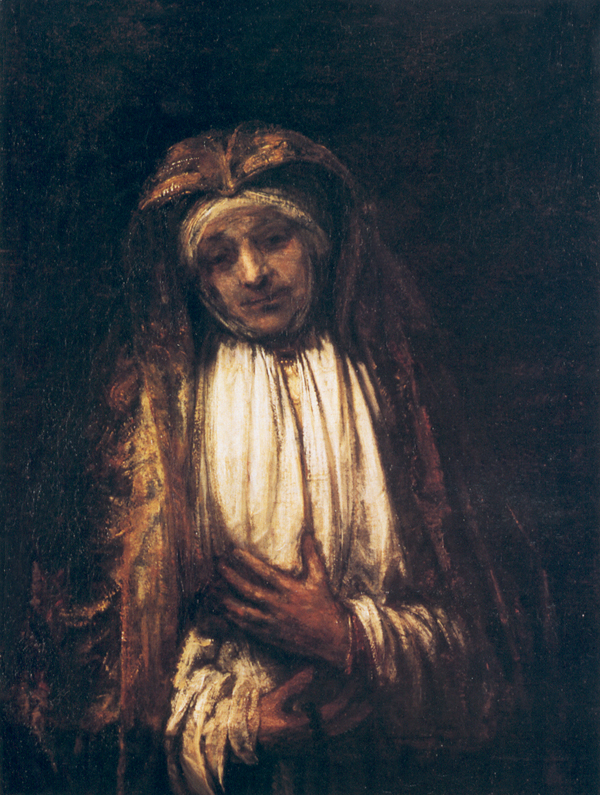
Mater Dolorosa by Rembrandt

The museum has a collection of paintings that includes works by Rembrandt (Mater Dolorosa), Georges de La Tour, Le Lorrain, Simon Vouet, Pierre Mignard, Jan Brueghel the Elder, Jacob van Ruysdael, Jan van Goyen, Salvator Rosa, Sebastiano Ricci, Nicolas de Largillière, Giovanni Paolo Pannini and Hubert Robert.
