= Titus as a Monk =

1660 painting by Rembrandt van Rijn

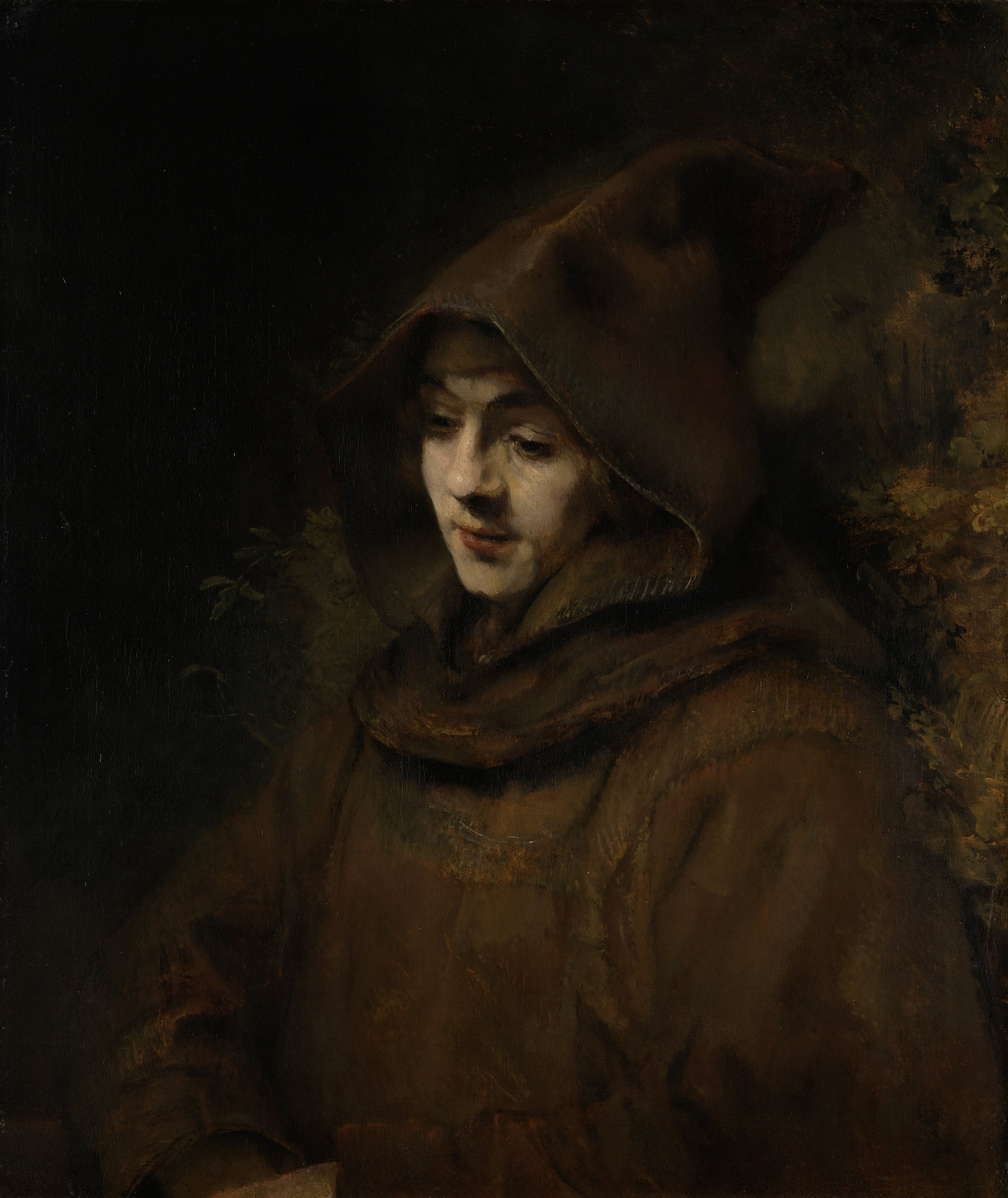
- Artist: Rembrandt
- Year: 1660
- Medium: Oil on canvas
- Dimensions: 79.5 cm × 67.5 cm (31.3 in × 26.6 in)
- Location: Rijksmuseum, Amsterdam

Titus as a Monk (Dutch: Titus als monnik) or Rembrandt's Son Titus in a Monk's Habit is a 1660 oil-on-canvas painting by the Dutch artist Rembrandt, showing his son Titus in the habit of a Franciscan. It is now in the collection of the Rijksmuseum in Amsterdam.

== See also ==
- List of paintings by Rembrandt
