= History Painting (Rembrandt) =

Painting by Rembrandt

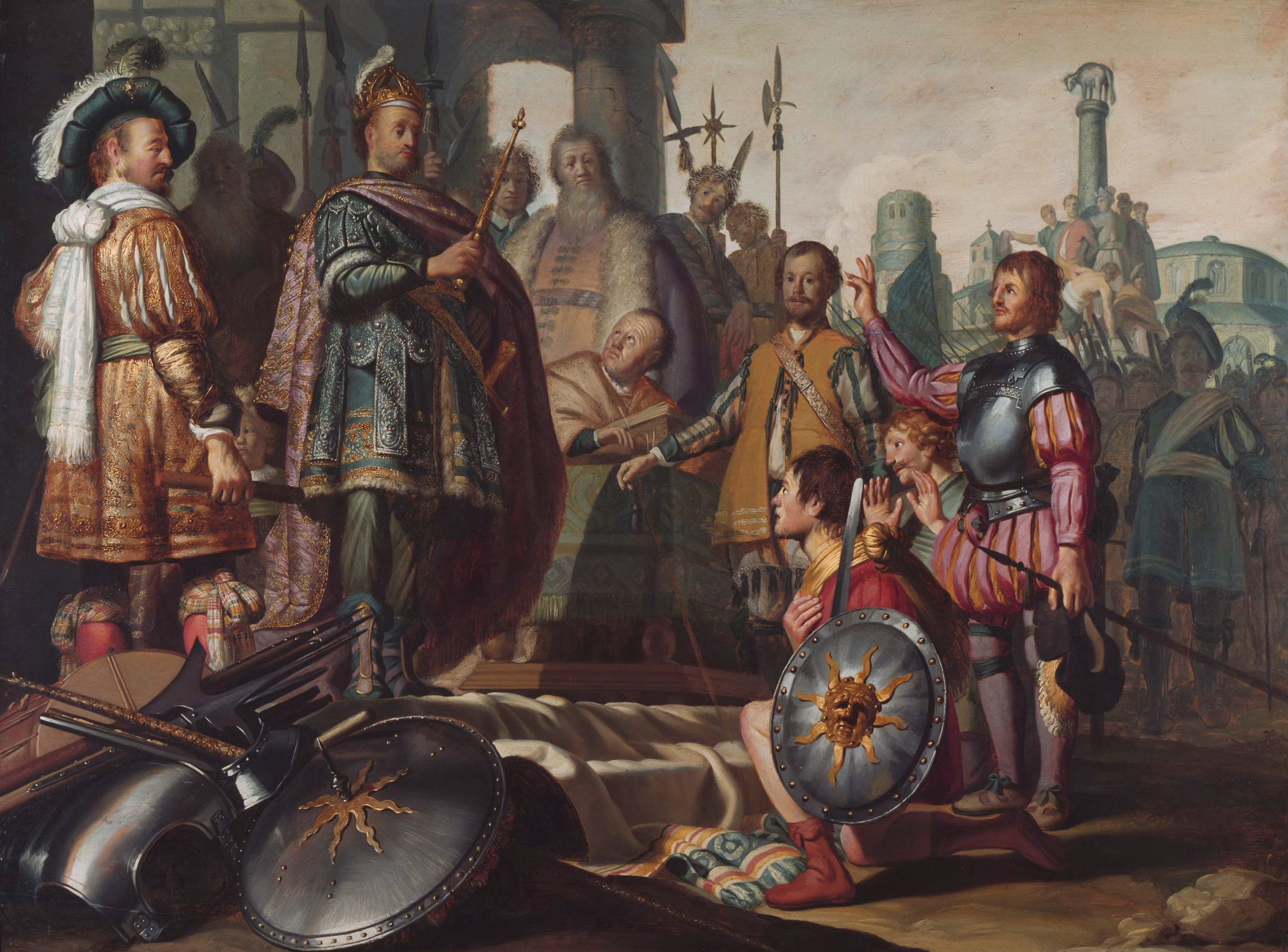
- Artist: Rembrandt
- Year: 1626
- Medium: oil on panel
- Dimensions: 90 cm × 122 cm (35 in × 48 in)
- Location: Stedelijk Museum De Lakenhal (permanent loan); Leiden

History Painting is an early painting by Rembrandt dating to 1626. The title is a generic reference to history painting, as there is no consensus about the painting's subject matter. More than a dozen subjects have been proposed, ranging from Biblical themes to classical and modern history. Art historian Gary Schwartz says "the most tempting solution offered so far is Palamedes before Agamemnon", an episode from the Trojan War in which Agamemnon orders Palamedes stoned to death on the basis of planted evidence.

Owned by the Instituut Collectie Nederland, it is on permanent loan to the Stedelijk Museum De Lakenhal in Leiden.

== See also ==
- List of paintings by Rembrandt
