= Abraham Serving the Three Angels =

1646 painting by Rembrandt

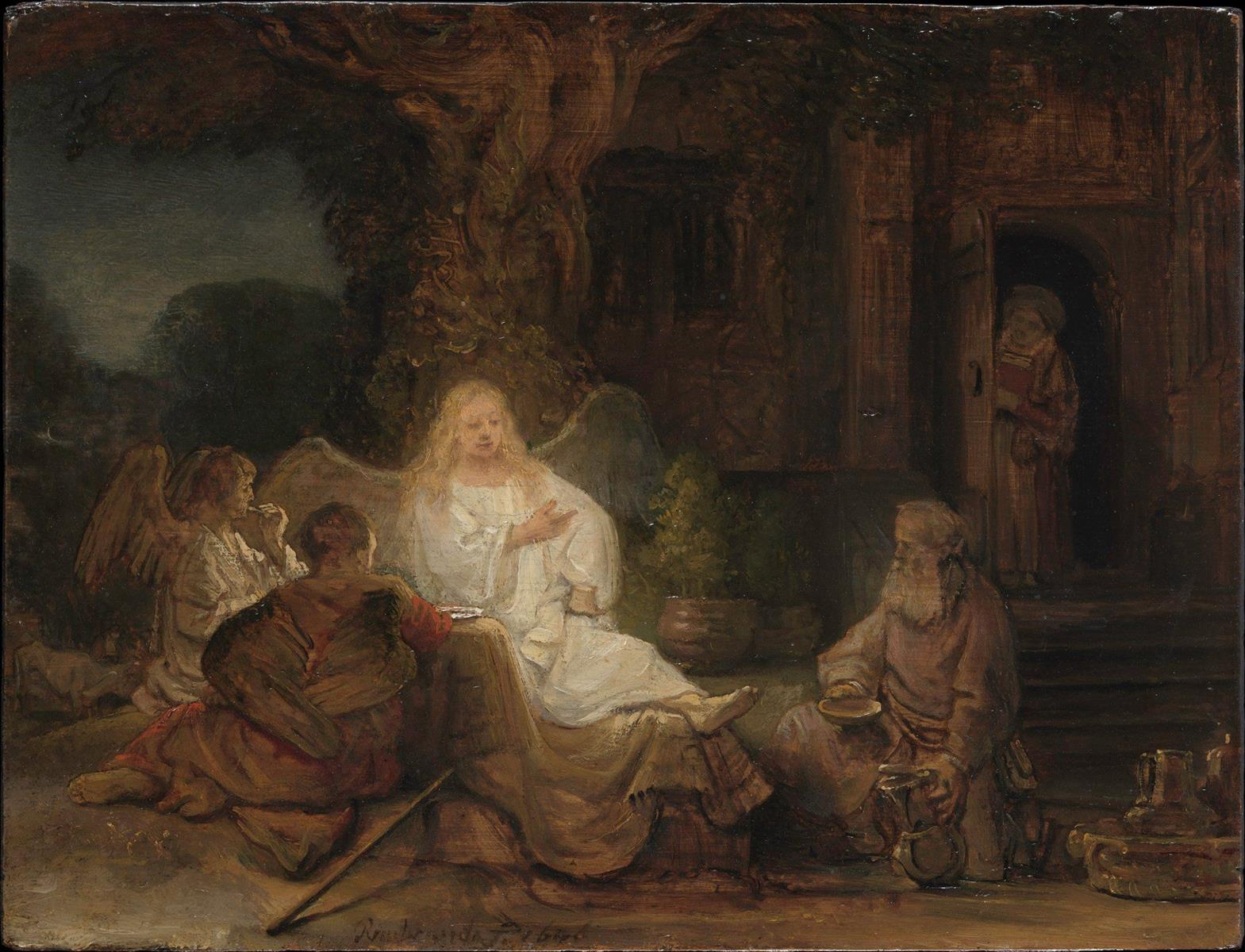
- Artist: Rembrandt
- Year: 1646
- Dimensions: 16 cm × 21 cm (6.3 in × 8.3 in)
- Location: Private collection

Abraham Serving the Three Angels is a 1646 oil-on-panel painting by Rembrandt. The scene depicts Abraham, it is based on an episode from the Book of Genesis (18:1–12) and it has Mughal influence. Today it is in a private collection since it was bought in an auction in 1848 for £64 (equivalent to $8,000 in 2023). Before that its owners were Ferdinand Bol, a student of Rembrandt, the Dutch art collector and Mayor of Amsterdam, Jan Six as well as Benjamin West, an American artist.

In 2021, the painting was put up for sale by its current owner, Mark Fisch (the Metropolitan Museum trustee).

== See also ==
- List of paintings by Rembrandt
