= Christian Tümpel =

German art historian

- Born: 31 March 1937; Bielefeld, Germany
- Died: 9 September 2009 (aged 72); Bad Kissingen, Germany

Christian Tümpel (1937–2009) was a German art historian active in the Netherlands.

Tümpel was born in Bielefeld. He first studied theology and philosophy before continuing his education at Heidelberg in art history and archeology, receiving his doctorate from Hamburg with a dissertation on Rembrandt. From 1970 when their catalog for a Rembrandt bible exhibition was well-received, he collaborated with his wife Astrid Tümpel, who was also an art historian. They are known for their publications on art, but most notably their catalog raisonné on Rembrandt while Christian was professor at the Katholieke Universiteit Nijmegen. Tümpel died in Bad Kissingen.

Tümpel's son Daniel became an art trader who co-founded Fine Art Partners with Loretta Würtenberger in Berlin.
