= Self-Portrait as Zeuxis Laughing =

Painting by Rembrandt, 1663

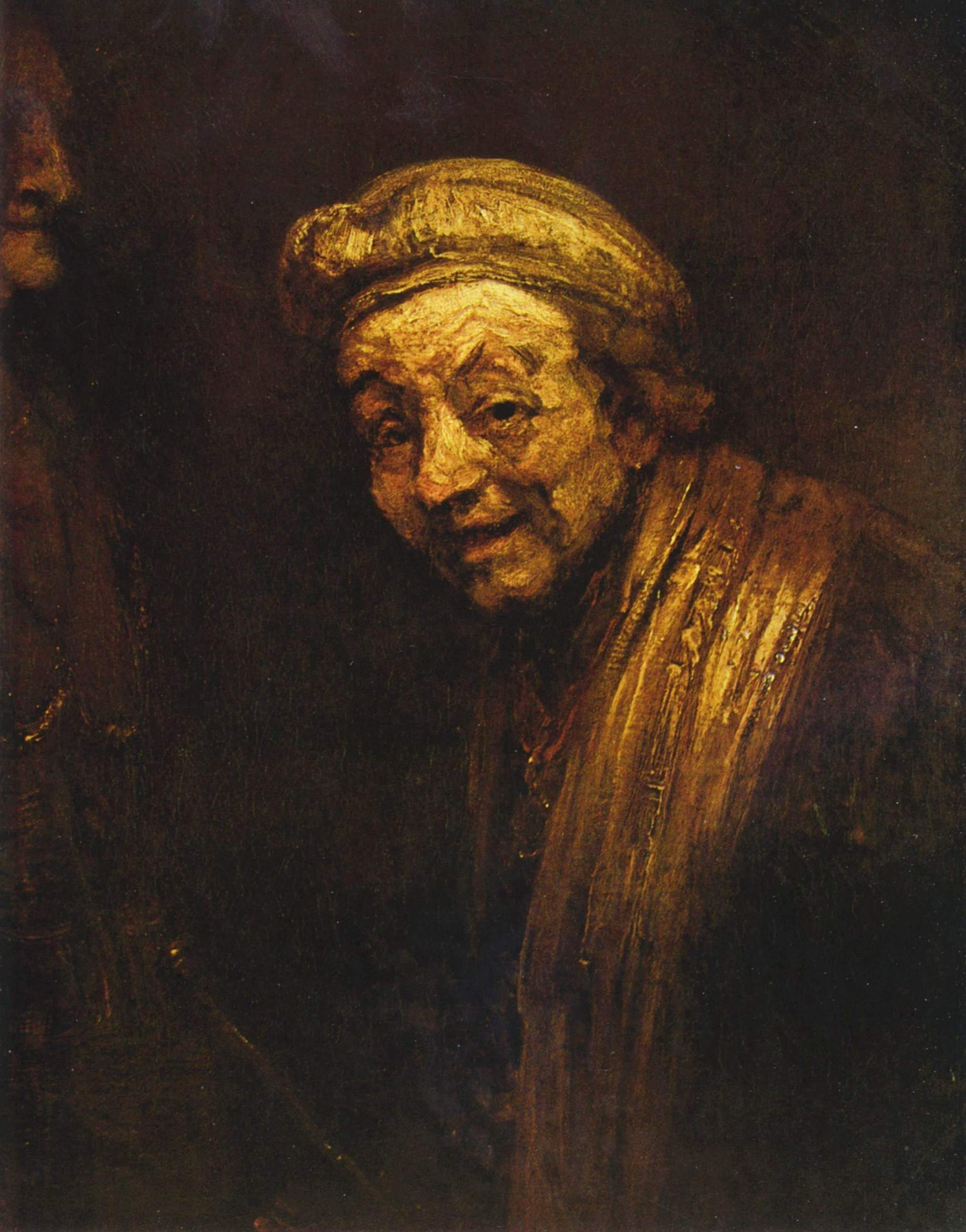
- Artist: Rembrandt van Rijn
- Year: c. 1662
- Dimensions: 82.5 cm × 65 cm (32.5 in × 26 in)
- Location: Wallraf-Richartz-Museum

Self-Portrait as Zeuxis Laughing (Dutch: Zelfportret als Zeuxis) is a self-portrait by the 17th-century Dutch painter Rembrandt Harmenszoon van Rijn. The self-portrait, completed circa 1662, was one of the last of over 40 self-portraits Rembrandt created before his death in 1668. The work is on a lined canvas measuring 82.5 x 65 cm, residing in the Wallraf-Richartz Museum in Cologne, Germany.

Rembrandt depicts himself as the Greek painter Zeuxis who famously laughed himself to death while painting an old woman, an anecdote originally told in Marcus Verrius Flaccus's dictionary De verborum significatione. Rembrandt was known for his ability to depict emotion in his artwork. More than just a humorous or theatrical image, the work reflects Rembrandt’s mastery of emotional expression, his evolving painting techniques, and his engagement with symbolic and classical themes.

== Description ==
Rembrandt's Self-Portrait as Zeuxis Laughing displays his distinctive approach to light and expression. Rembrandt achieves a deep contrast of light and dark with chiaroscuro, a technique that is a pillar of his artistic style. Here, Rembrandt depicts himself as the central focal point, turned toward the viewer, in the act of laughing. A singular light source highlights the joyful expression on his face, while the background of the composition is kept dark, creating a dramatic effect. The drastic contrast of light to dark further accentuates the illuminated areas. As seen on his face, the wrinkles and texture of the skin are clearly defined. His eyes sparkle with amusement, while his eyebrows are raised and mouth half-open, showing his contentment. Rembrandt paints his eyebrows raised high and asymmetrically so that the folds of his eyes are stretched tight. This asymmetrical feature is present in many of Rembrandt's portraits, providing realism and depth to his expressions. The portrait's warm color palette with earthy tones also contributes to the lifelike quality of the portrait.

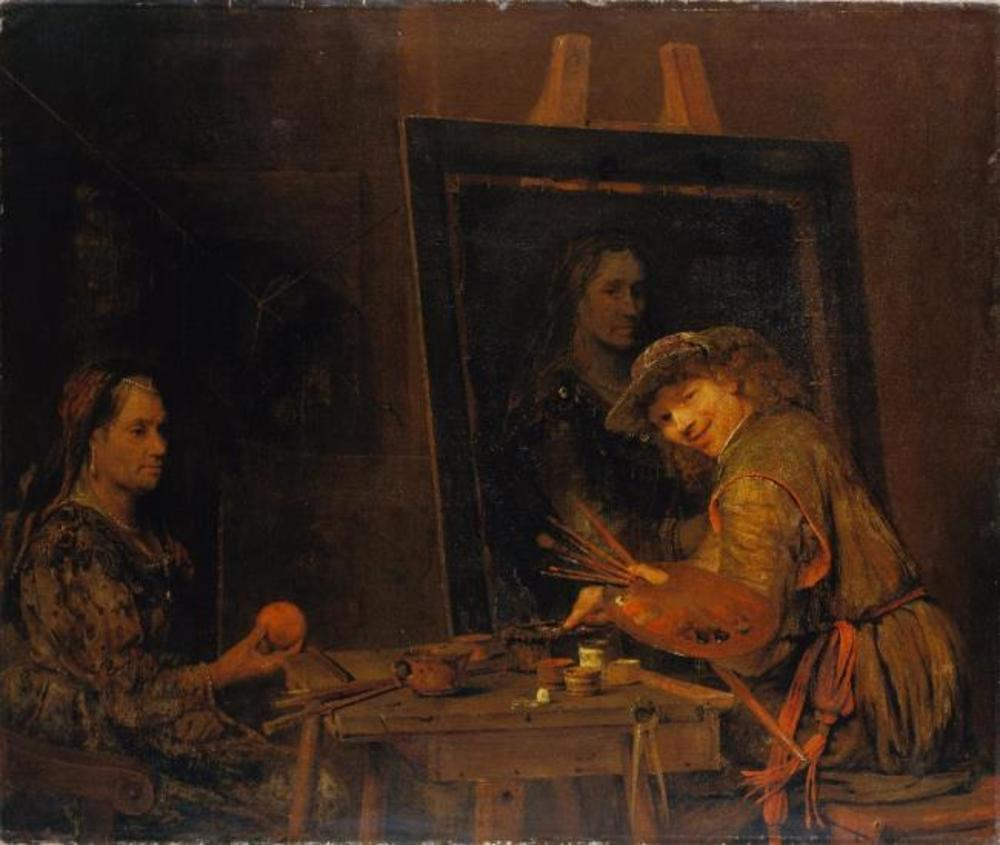
Arent de Gelder, Self-Portrait as Zeuxis Portraying an Ugly Old Woman, 1685, oil on canvas, 141.5 x 167.3 cm, Städel Museum

A hidden figure protruding on the left side of the composition also reveals a key detail. The figure's large nose, sharp chin, and receding upper lip are barely distinguishable. Around her neck are two dark ribbons, the lower of which supports a dangling gold link chain. While the figure has sometimes been interpreted as representing a philosopher, a comparison with the painting Self-Portrait as Zeuxis Portraying an Ugly Old Woman by Rembrandt's pupil Arent de Gelder indicates that she is the old woman from the story of Zeuxis.

Rembrandt may have found the story in Karel van Mander's Schielder-Boeck, which describes how Zeuxis died by suffocating with laughter while making a portrait of a wrinkled old woman posing as the goddess of love. In de Gelder's piece, the main figure is seated at his easel and glances over his shoulder with a wide grin, much as the artist does in Rembrandt's Self-Portrait as Zeuxis Laughing. Next to the artist in de Gelder's painting, a woman is seated posing while holding an apple or orange in her hand. The fruit is possibly an ironic allusion to the golden apple presented to Venus as fairest of the goddesses. De Gelder's piece also shows the figure physically in the act of painting the woman. While Rembrandt is not shown doing this, an X-radiograph of the painting revealed that Rembrandt initially depicted himself at work with his right hand holding a brush raised to a canvas.

The low, square-cut neckline of his top was very typical of an earlier 16th-century fashion. Rembrandt also wears a white cap and holds a maulstick, items associated with the profession of painting. At the time of his death, an inventory of his belongings indicated that he owned 10 caps made of linen. Compared to other 17th-century inventories, these linen caps were very common and were worn around the house.

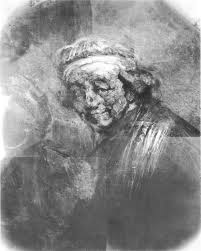
X-ray imaging reveals alterations to the work.

== Painting techniques ==
Rembrandt incorporated multiple artistic styles in the self-portrait in order to accomplish a variety of effects. Rembrandt used a palette knife, or similar flat tool, to create elongated, vertical highlights on the scarf collar. These strokes have straight edges, which contrast the soft lines of his brushstrokes. He also employed finger painting for part of the left eyebrow, resulting in a blurred appearance. This self-portrait, in particular, is described as unusually rough and freely painted compared to his other works. It has a mix of heavily loaded brush strokes and light dabbing movements. This indicates that Rembrandt was experimenting with texture and trying to express himself more than accomplish perfect precision. There is a dab of paint over the nostril, showing that the directions of the brushstrokes don’t always follow the form.

Rembrandt employed a technique known as impasto, applying thick layers of oil paint to create a pronounced sense of texture. This creates a sense of depth and dimensionality in the Self-portrait as Zeuxis Laughing, enhancing its visual impact. The surface of the piece was flattened during lining, and the buildup of varnish makes the surface appear smoother than initially intended. Despite the flattening, impasto remains in areas of lighter coloration, such as the face, cap, and gown collar.

== Symbolism ==
For years, Rembrandt's Self-Portrait as Zeuxis Laughing was an iconographical mystery. Scholars widely debated why Rembrandt chose to depict himself in this emotional state and what historical figure he stylized himself after.

=== A reflection on death ===
One popular interpretation was presented by Jan Bialostacki who proposed that Rembrandt depicts himself before a bust of Terminus, a symbol of death. According to this view, the painting not only captures a moment of exuberant laughter but also embeds a meditation on mortality.

The interpretation was initially met with a positive reaction and spurred further commentary in this vein by art historians Colin Eisler and Kenneth M. Chapman. It is no longer widely accepted both because Bialostacki's dating of the painting to the late 1660s has faced criticism, and because Blankert's reading of the painting as a depiction of Zeuxis offers a better account of the various elements in the painting.

=== A repudiation of classicism ===
Albert Blankert, who was the first to correctly identify the painting to be a reference to Zeuxis, believed that Rembrandt intended to mount a subtle yet pointed repudiation of the rising classicist tendencies of his time, particularly the ideas put forward in the French Academy. Rembrandt’s depiction of himself abstains from such polish in favor of raw verisimilitude. His choice to present an unidealized, emotive image, complete with the visible textures of aging skin, the rough impasto of his brushstrokes, and a self-effacing, open-mouthed laugh, stands in sharp contrast to the restrained approaches championed in the French Academy. By presenting himself as Zeuxis painting an ugly woman, Rembrandt subverts the classical pursuit of perfection. The classical paradigm typically involved idealizing subjects to elevate the spirit and evoke moral contemplation, yet this work embraces imperfection and human frailty. Rembrandt’s deliberately rough application of paint, employing a palette knife to create bold, elongated highlights and even using his fingers to blur features, further undermines the meticulous techniques celebrated by classical proponents.

This repudiation of classicism can also be read as a critique of the shifting tastes in 17th-century Dutch society. Rembrandt himself was criticized for a preference of "picturesque" subjects, such as wrinkled old women. Blankert supported the position that the painting is an intentional subversion of Zeuxis's idealism by referencing a conversation, which may not have taken place, between Rembrandt and the old master Gerard De Lairesse. Rembrandt is said to have rejected De Lairesse's arguments in favor of the classicist approach around the same time the painting was completed. This interpretation is not widely held because most criticism of Rembrandt's realistic approach occurred after his death.

=== A display of emotion ===
Another interpretation of why Rembrandt chose to portray himself as Zeuxis has little to do with the tales of the Ancient Greek painter. Zeuxis was mentioned twice by Rembrandt's pupil Samuel van Hoogstraten in his book Introduction to the Academy of Painting, or the Visible World. In both instances, Hoogstraten affirms Zeuxis's ability to depict facial expressions and emotion. Zeuxis's reputation for conveying emotion is also mentioned by Van Mander, who stated that no other painter of antiquity could rival Zeuxis in this regard. Rembrandt received similar praise from an early age, and expressed the importance of the realistic depiction of emotion, along with his satisfaction with his capacity to do so, in letters to contemporaries. Van Hoogstraten later listed the specialties of various painters, and for Rembrandt he concluded his was the ability to depict "states of emotion" ("de lijdingen des gemoeds").

Due to Rembrandt's pride in this ability and Zeuxis's reputation for the same, some propose that Rembrandt simply wished to portray himself as a classical painter whom he saw as a model. This view is further supported by van Hoogstraten's assertion that Zeuxis's reputation for emotion was most striking in the episode of his life where he laughed himself to death. Thus Rembrandt's choice of topic may simply reflect a wish to be appreciated similarly to Zeuxis. The intended audience for Rembrandt's self-portraits were art lovers and collectors who would likely be able to appreciate such a reference.

== See also ==
- List of paintings by Rembrandt
