= Lucretia (Rembrandt, 1664) =

1664 painting by Rembrandt

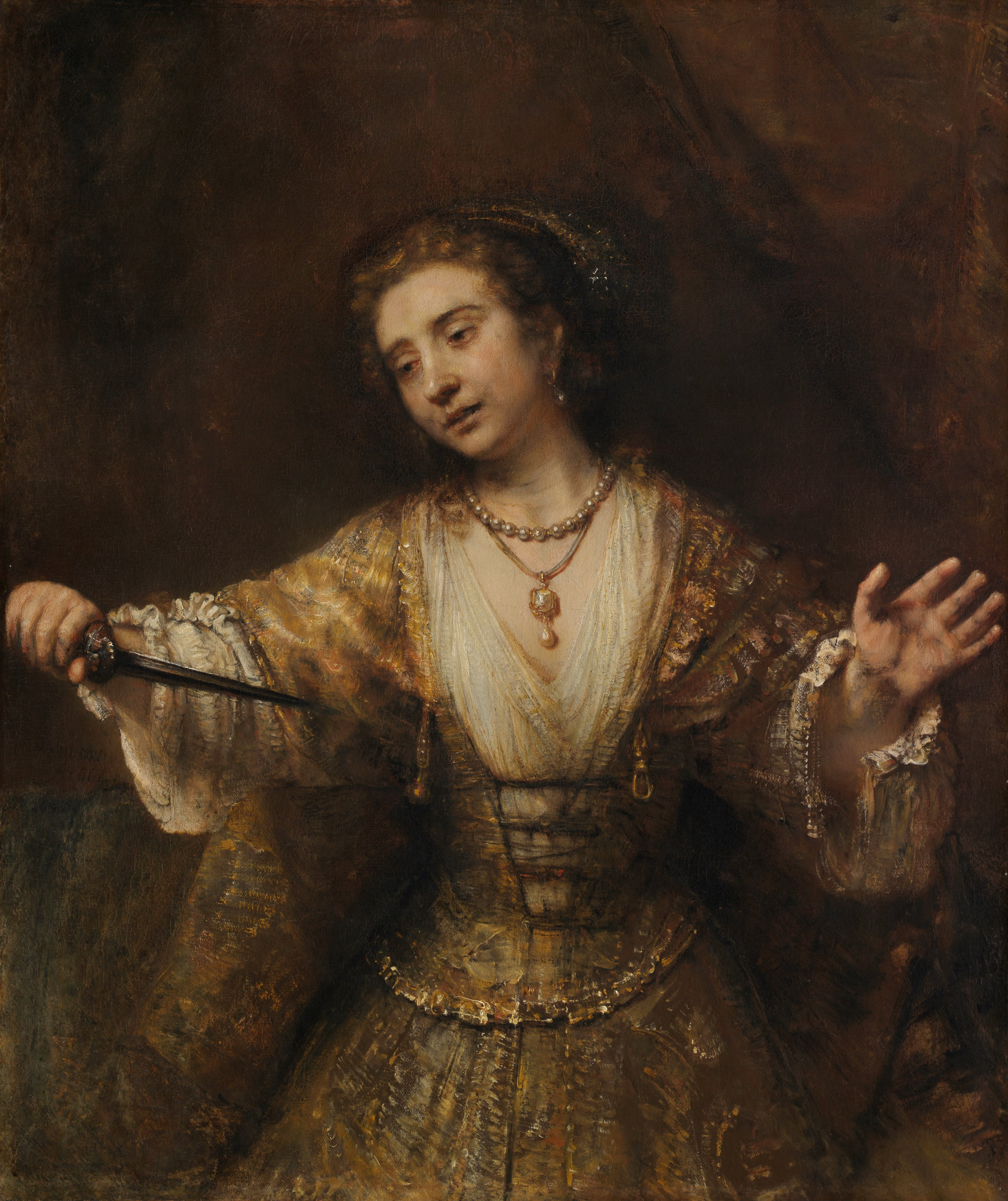
Lucretia (1664). Historically attributed to Rembrandt, but not by the Rembrandt Research Project (2015). 120 cm (47 in) × 101 cm (40 in). National Gallery of Art, Washington D.C.

Lucretia is a 1664 history painting of Roman noblewoman Lucretia, historically attributed to the Dutch Golden Age painter Rembrandt in the collection of the National Gallery of Art. In 2015, Ernst van de Wetering of the Rembrandt Research Project said that "the formal properties and execution of [this] painting, I am convinced, exclude the possibility that it could be an autograph work by Rembrandt", and that the painting recalls Aert de Gelder. The painting is not included in the project's 2015 Rembrandt corpus (while the 1666 Lucretia is).

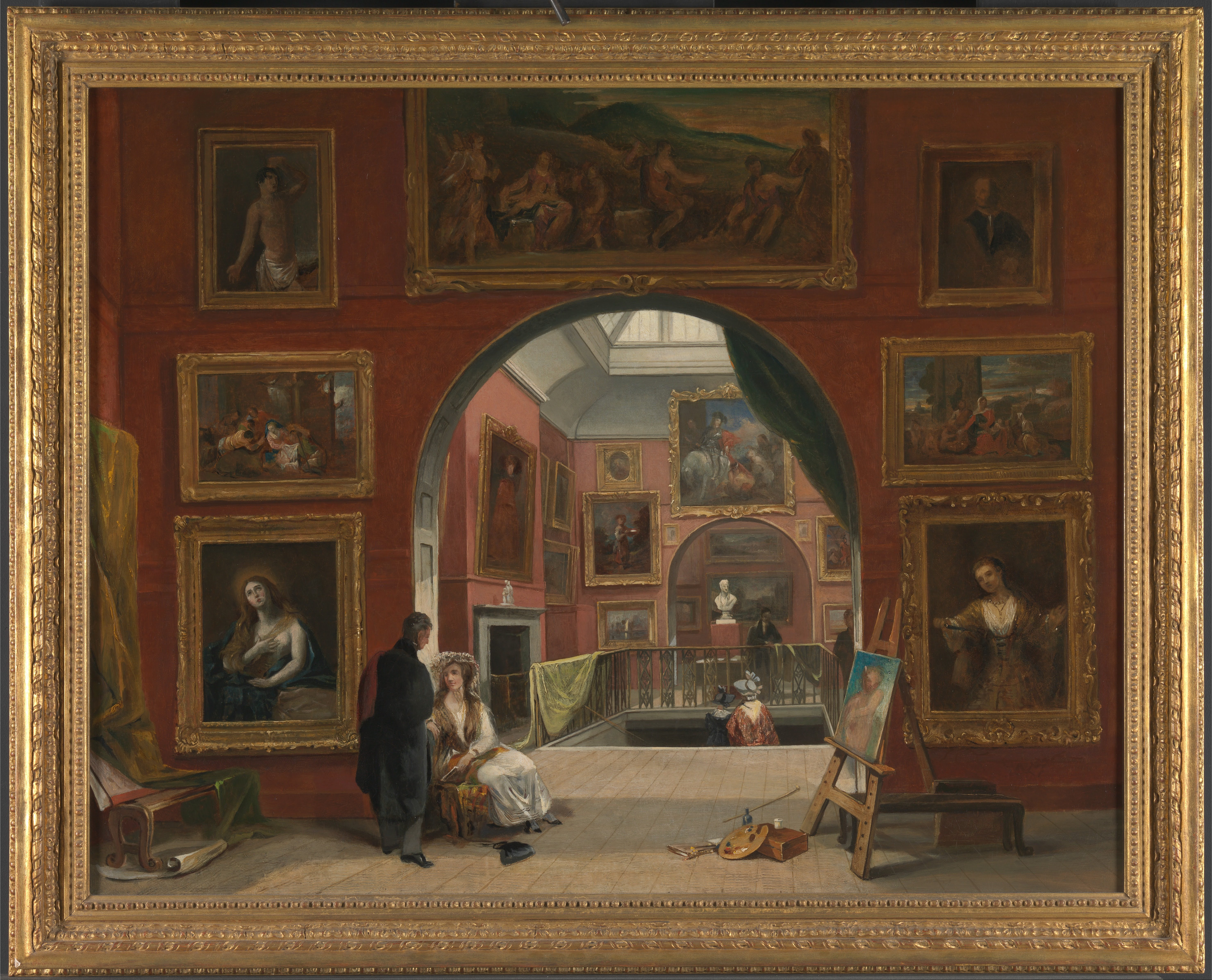
Interior of the British Institution in London in 1832, with this painting shown lower right, by Alfred Joseph Woolmer

== Painting ==
This painting was documented by Hofstede de Groot in 1915, who wrote:

218. LUCRETIA. Sm. 192; Bode 375; Dut. 114; Wb. 357; B-HdG. 595. Seen in full face with the lips parted. She inclines her head slightly to the left, in which direction she is looking. With her right hand she points a dagger at her breast; her uplifted left hand is stretched out. She wears a rich dress of greenish gold with wide sleeves and a laced bodice. Round her throat are a pearl necklace and a string with a pendant; in her ear is a pearl. Life size, more than half-length. Signed on the left, "Rembrandt f. 1664"; canvas, 46 inches by 39 inches. Exhibited at the British Institution, London, 1832, No. 44; at the Hudson-Fulton Celebration, Metropolitan Museum, New York, 1909, No. 105 [lent by M. C. D. Borden]; [in London, June 1913, by M. Knoedler and Co.]; at Amsterdam, 1913. Etched by W. Koepping in L' Art, and in the Demidoff sale-catalogue. Mentioned by Vosmaer, pp. 367, 564; by Bode, pp. 524, 608; by Dutuit, p. 58; by Michel, pp. 489, 563 [380-82, 435].

Sales. Lapeyriere, Paris, April 19, 1825 (1300 francs). London, 1826 (£199 : 10s., bought in). Michael Zachary, London, 1828 (£115 : 10s., Sir T. Lawrence for Munro). H. A. J. Munro of Novar, London, March 26, 1859. Prince Paul Demidoff, San Donato, near Florence, March 15, 1880, No. 1146 (14,700 francs). In the possession of the Paris dealer S. Bourgeois.

Sale. M. C. D. Borden, New York, February 13, 1913 (26,000, M. Knoedler and Co.). In the possession of Fred. Muller and Co., Amsterdam. In the collection of August Janssen, Amsterdam."

Before him, Smith wrote:

192. The Death of Lucretia, The Roman heroine is represented in a loose and neglected attire, standing in a front view, her countenance, indicating the firm resolve of her injured honour, is slightly raised, while her right hand plunges the dagger in her bosom. Colour, effect, and dexterous execution, are the chief qualities of this production, which, according to the date, 1664, must have been one of his last works.

3ft. 6 in. by 3ft.— C. Collection of M. Lapeyriere, Paris, 1825. . 1300 fs. 52l. In a sale at Mr. H. Phillips, . . 1826. . (bt. in.) 190 gs. Collection of Michael Zachary, Esq., . . 1828 110 gs.

Exhibited in the British Gallery in 1832. Now in the collection of J. H. Munro, Esq.

Two years later Rembrandt made another painting of Lucretia, depicting the moment after she stabs herself:

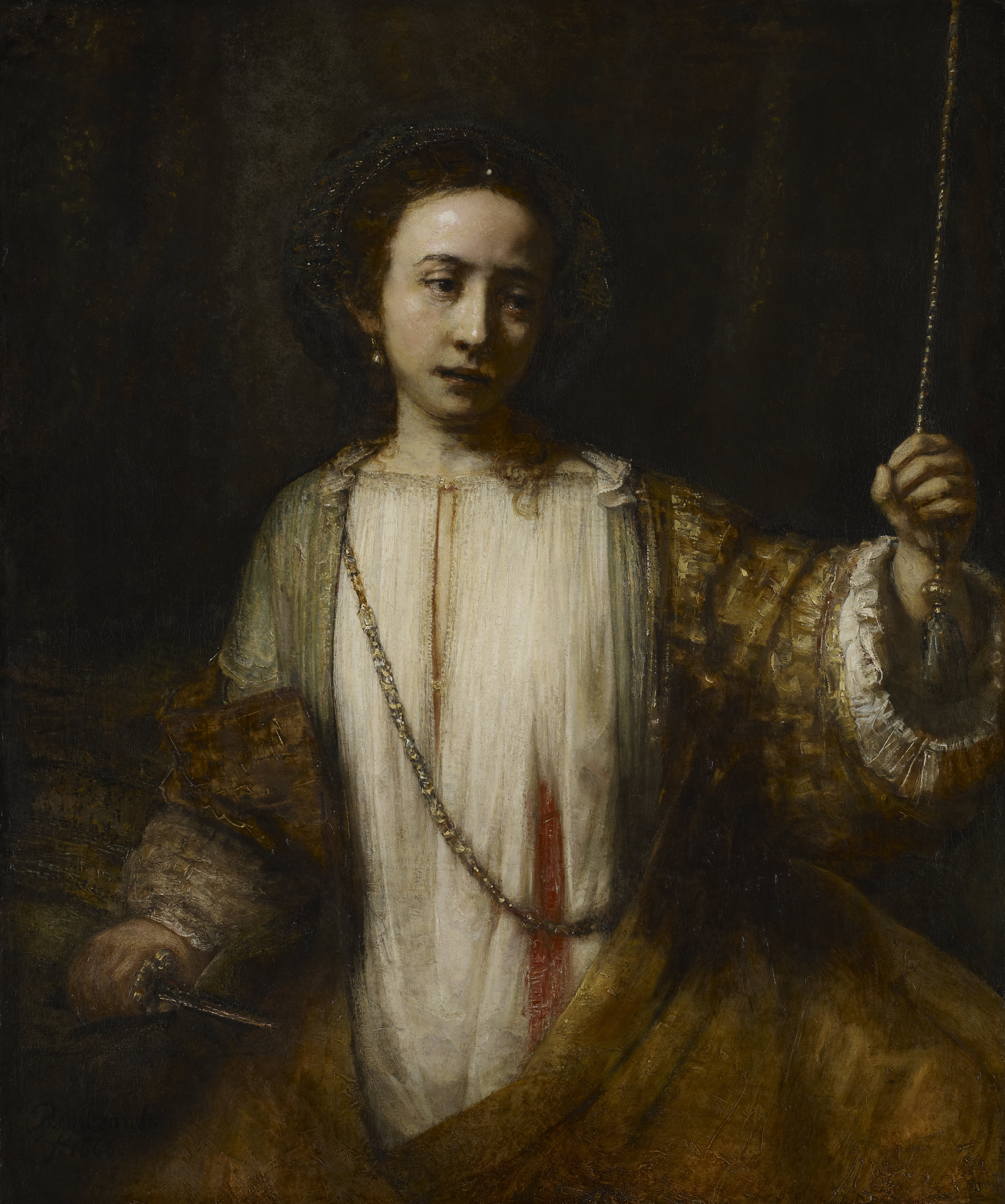
Lucretia after stabbing herself

== See also ==
- List of paintings by Rembrandt
