= Holy Family with Angels (Rembrandt) =

1645 painting by Rembrandt

The Holy Family with Angels
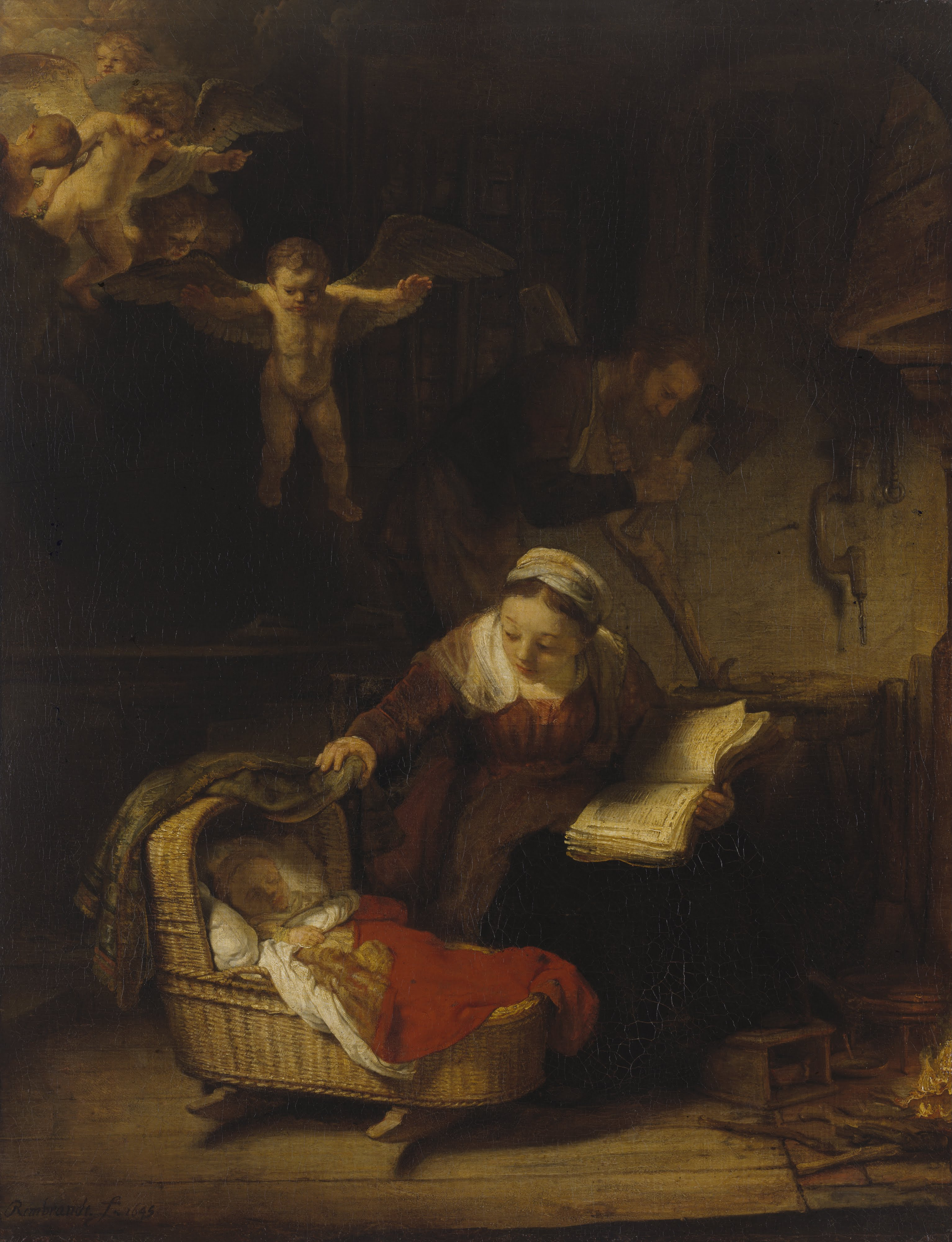
- Artist: Rembrandt
- Year: 1645
- Medium: oil paint
- Dimensions: 117 cm (46 in) × 91 cm (36 in)
- Location: Hermitage Museum

The Holy Family with Angels (1645) is an oil painting on canvas by the Dutch painter Rembrandt. It is an example of Dutch Golden Age painting and is now in the collection of the Hermitage Museum.

== Description ==
This painting was documented by Hofstede de Groot in 1915, who wrote:

94. THE HOLY FAMILY WITH THE ANGELS. Sm. 72.; Bode 321; Dutuit 59; Wb. 391; B.-HdG. 251. In the foreground of Joseph's carpenter's workshop, the Virgin Mary sits on a low chair, holding a large open book on her left arm. She rests her left foot on a foot-warmer and leans over to the left to draw the green curtain of the cradle in which the Child lies asleep under a red fur-lined coverlet. Mary wears a deep red gown and dark blue skirt, and a white kerchief and cap. Behind her in half-shadow, Joseph, in a brown working-dress, is shaping a yoke with his axe. From above to the left child-angels flutter down, throwing a bright light on the Virgin and the cradle. Full-length figures, almost half life-size. Signed on the left at foot, "Rembrandt f. 1645"; canvas, 46 1/2 inches by 36 inches. An old copy without the angels was in the possession of an English dealer in 1899, and afterwards in the possession of a New York dealer. Another copy without the angels was in the sale: –London, June 7, 1912, No. 23 (£15 : 15s.). A pen-drawing for the picture is in the collection of Leon Bonnat, Paris; reproduced by Lippmann-Hofstede de Groot, No. 20. A study in chalk for the Child in the cradle was in the collection of J. P. Heseltine, London, and is now in the collection of H. Oppenheim, London; reproduced by Lippmann, No. i883. Engraved by J. Vendramini, 1836; by J. Sanders in outline in F. Labenski, Description de I'Ermitage, i. 28. Etched by N. Mossoloff in Les Rembrandts de l' Ermitage. Lithographed by H. Robillard in Gohier Desfontaines and P. Petit, Galerie de l' Ermitage, i. 4. Mentioned by Vosmaer, pp. 262, 537; by Bode, pp. 474, 599; by Dutuit, p. 38; by Michel, pp. 299, 566 [228-9, 441]; by Waagen, The Picture Gallery of the Hermitage, p. 177. Sale. Adriaen Bout, The Hague, August 11, 1733 (Hoet, i. 390), No. 81 (150 florins); said to measure 43 1/2 inches by 55 inches. In the Crozat collection, Paris; bought for the Hermitage by the Empress Catherine ii. In the Hermitage Palace, Petrograd, 1901 catalogue, No. 796 [said by Sm. in 1836 to be well worth £2100].

== Unusual portrayal in home setting ==
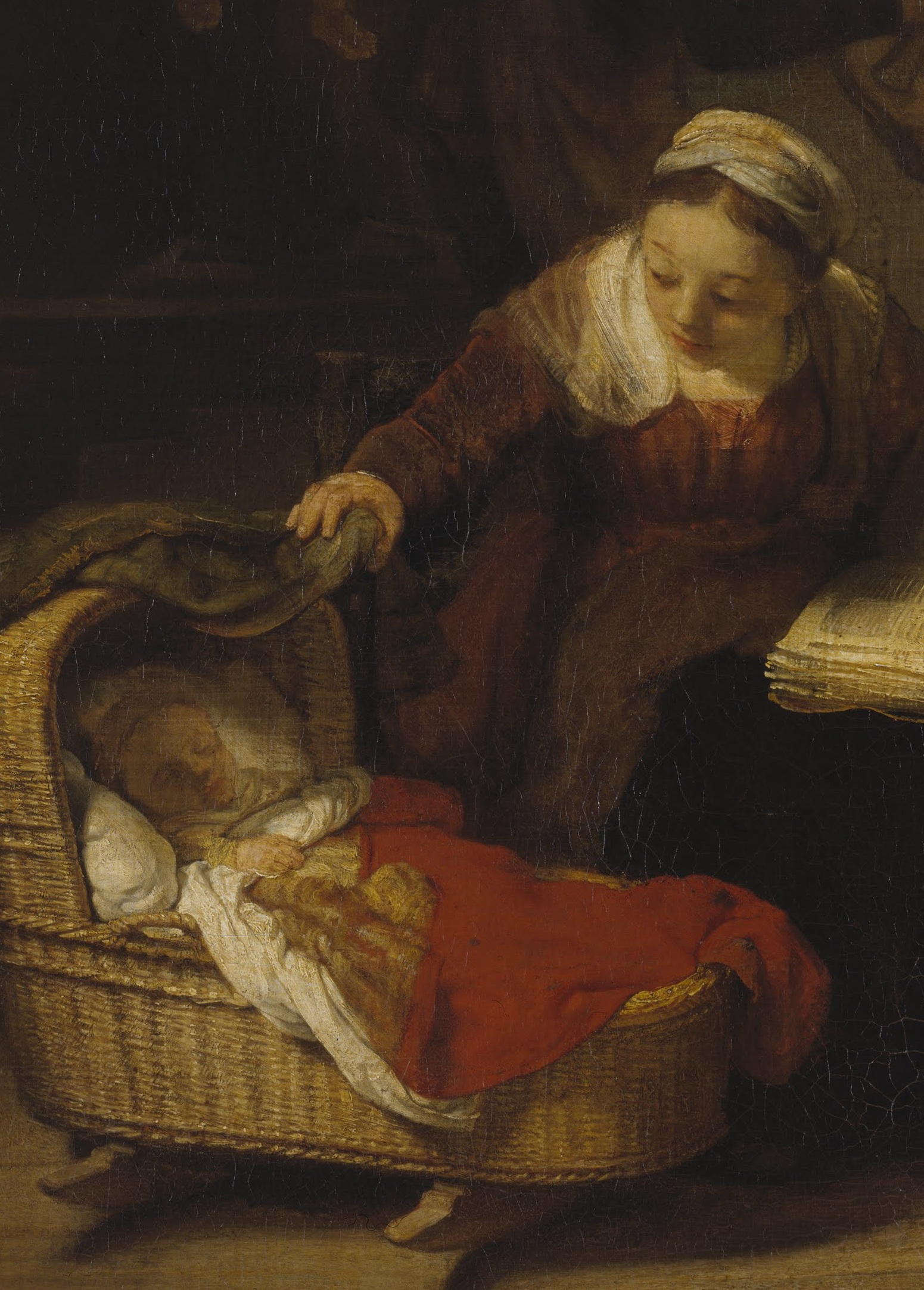
The baby Jesus is wearing a skull-cap with band known as a valhoed and he is propped up with cushions into a sitting position as was customary at that time.

Rembrandt portrays the Holy Family as a typical family of Amsterdam in his day. In the foreground Jesus is asleep in the same style of wicker crib that can be seen in period paintings of mothers with babies by Pieter de Hooch. Mary looks up from her book to take a peek at the sleeping child under the crib curtain (Dutch: klamboe). In the background Joseph is working on making a yoke.The yoke refers both to the coming of the Lord according to Isaiah ("For the yoke of their burden, and the bar across their shoulders, the rod of their oppressor, you have broken as on the day of Midian"), as well as the words of Jesus according to Matthew the Apostle ("Come to me, all you who are weary and burdened, and I will give you rest. Take my yoke upon you and learn from me, for I am gentle and humble in heart, and you will find rest for your souls, for my yoke is easy and my burden is light").

Other "Holy Family" paintings by Rembrandt or his school are:

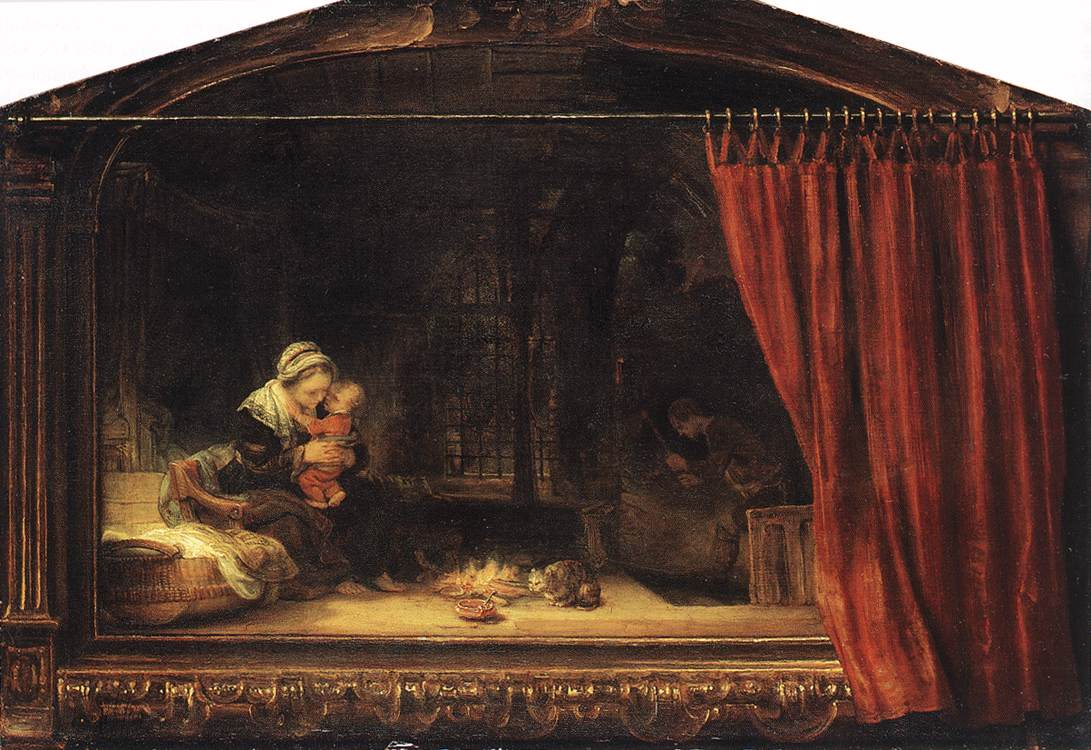
Gemäldegalerie Alte Meister (Kassel)

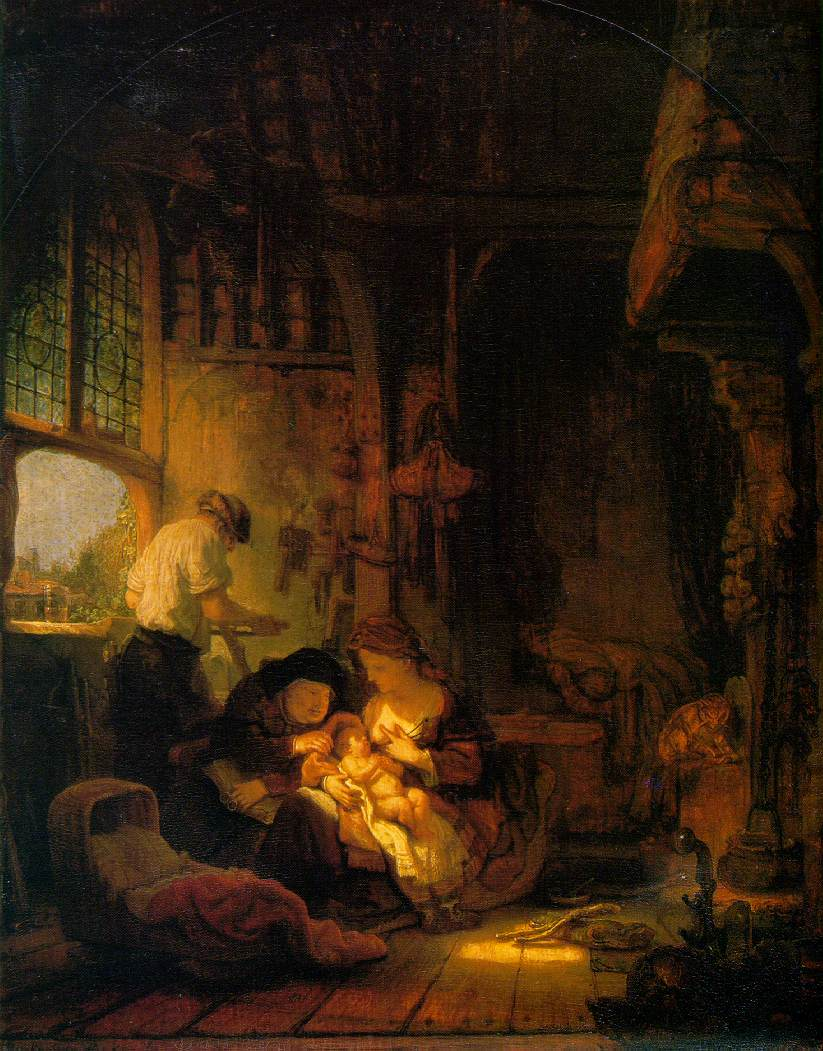
Louvre

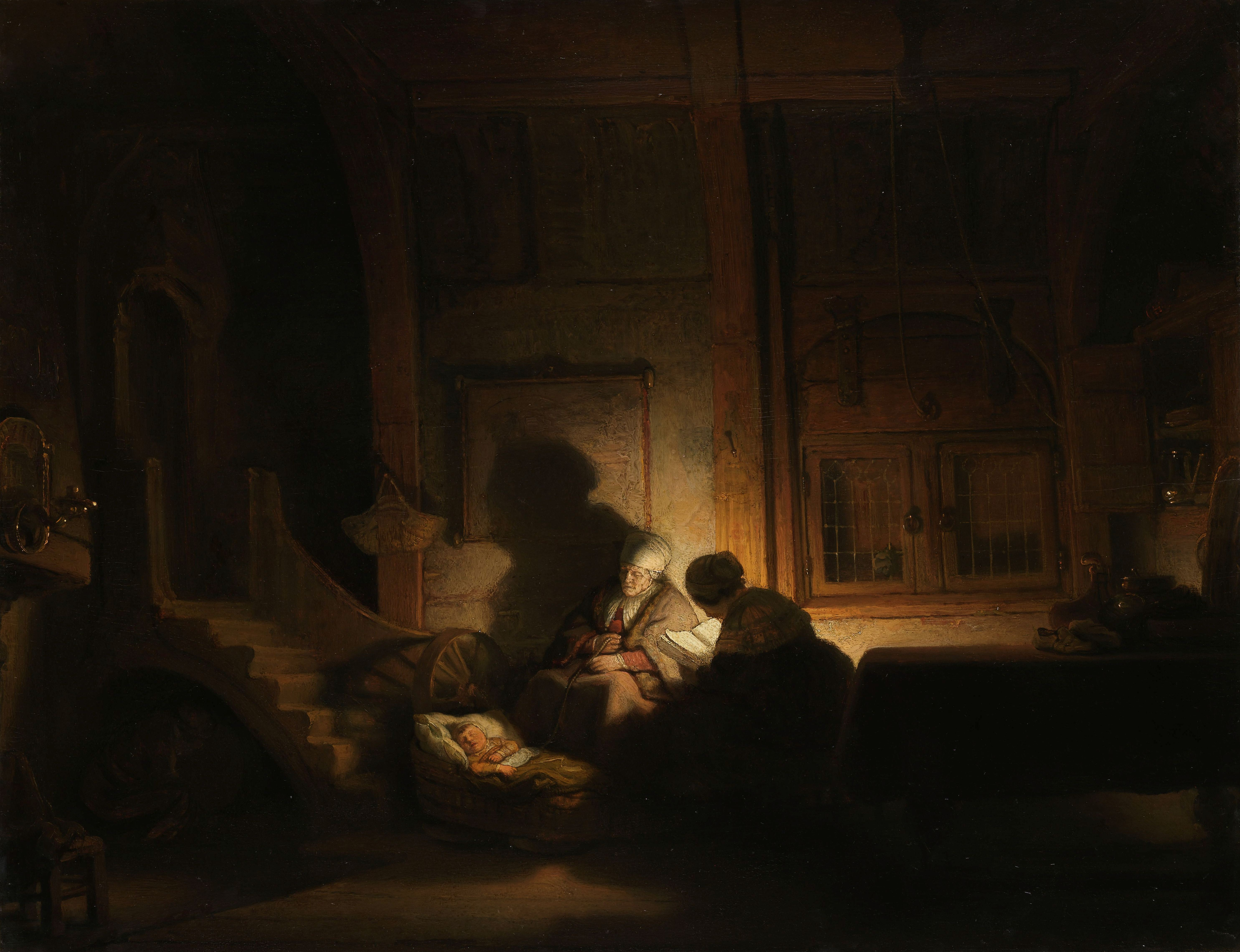
Rijksmuseum

== See also ==
- List of paintings by Rembrandt
