= Saint Matthew and the Angel (Rembrandt) =

Painting by Rembrandt

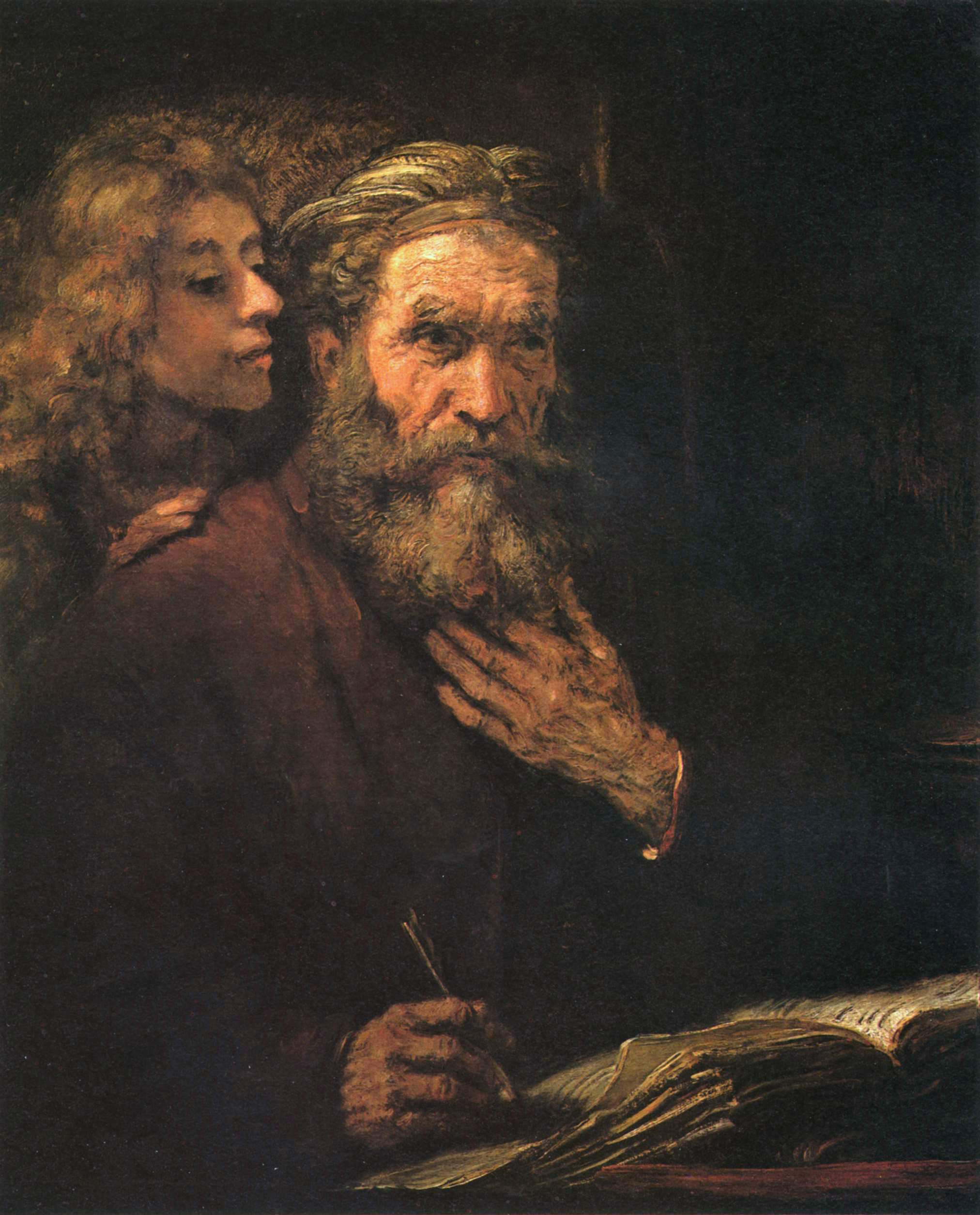
- Artist: Rembrandt
- Year: c. 1661
- Medium: Oil on canvas
- Dimensions: 96 cm × 81 cm (38 in × 32 in)
- Location: Louvre, Paris

Saint Matthew and the Angel (c. 1661) is an oil painting on canvas by the Dutch master Rembrandt. It is an example of Dutch Golden Age painting and is now in the collection of the Louvre.

This painting was documented by Hofstede de Groot in 1914, who wrote:

173. ST. MATTHEW THE EVANGELIST. Sm. 136; Bode 270; Dut. 102; Wb. 276; B.-HdG. 521. He sits behind a table with a book open before him, and gazes thoughtfully into the distance.

He is turned three-quarters right, and wears a coloured cap. His left hand is at his untrimmed and tangled beard; his right hand, holding a pen, rests on the book. He wears a loose chestnut-brown robe. An angel with rich fair curls at the back to the left lays his right hand on the evangelist's right shoulder and speaks to him. Half-length, life size. Cf. 172 and 174–5. Signed in the right centre, "Rembrandt f. 1661"; canvas, 38 inches by 32 inches. Mentioned by Vosmaer, pp. 361, 562; by Bode, pp. 523, 594; by Dutuit, p. 35; by Michel, pp. 463, 562 [361–2, 434]. Etched by Claessens in the Musée Francais; by Oortman in the Musée Napoléon, in Filhol, viii. 509, and Landon, ii. 57.

In the Louvre, Paris, 1907 catalogue, No. 2538.

Rembrandt was influenced in his arrangement with the angel acting as an assistant by an earlier work by Frans Hals:

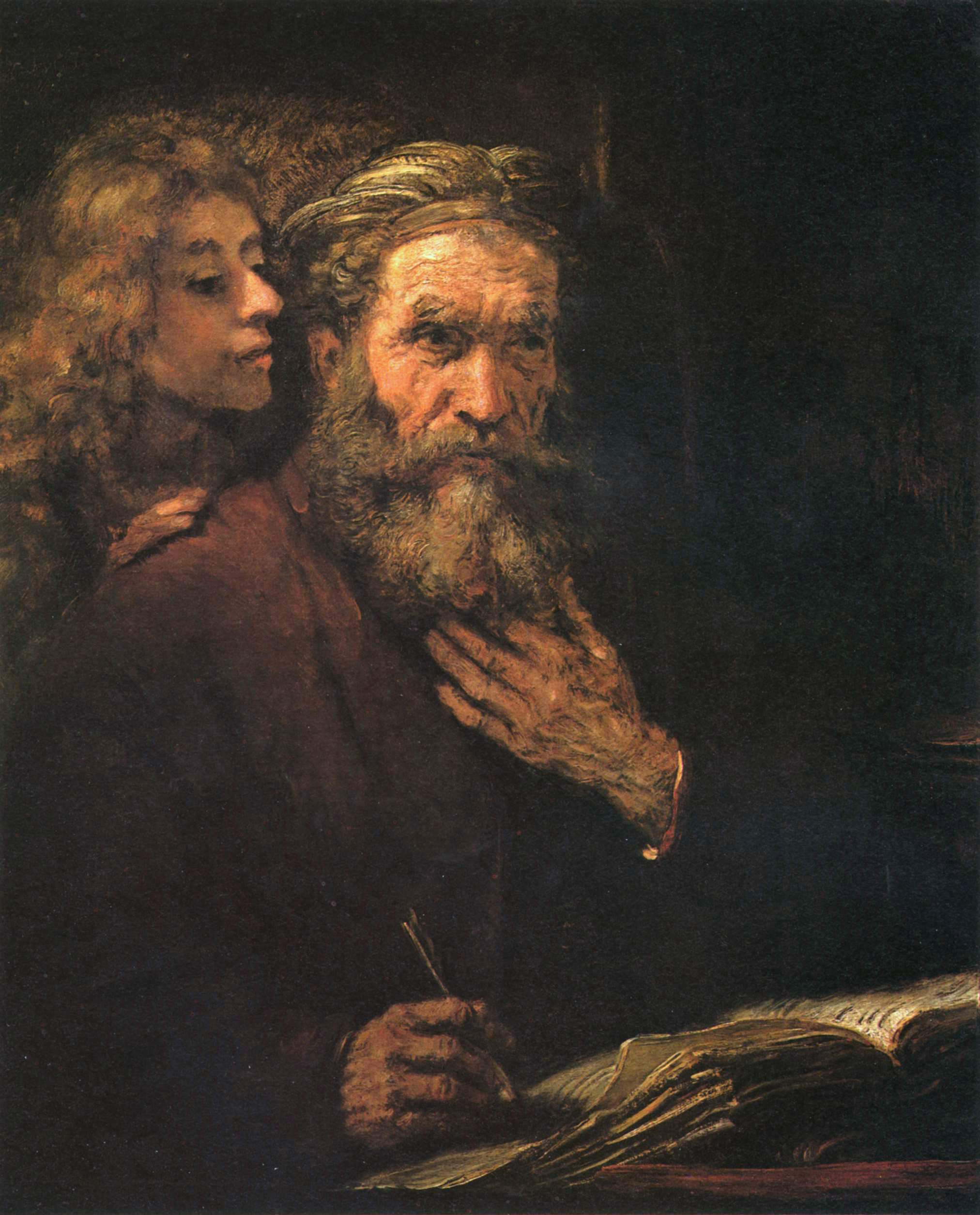
Saint Matthew, 1661

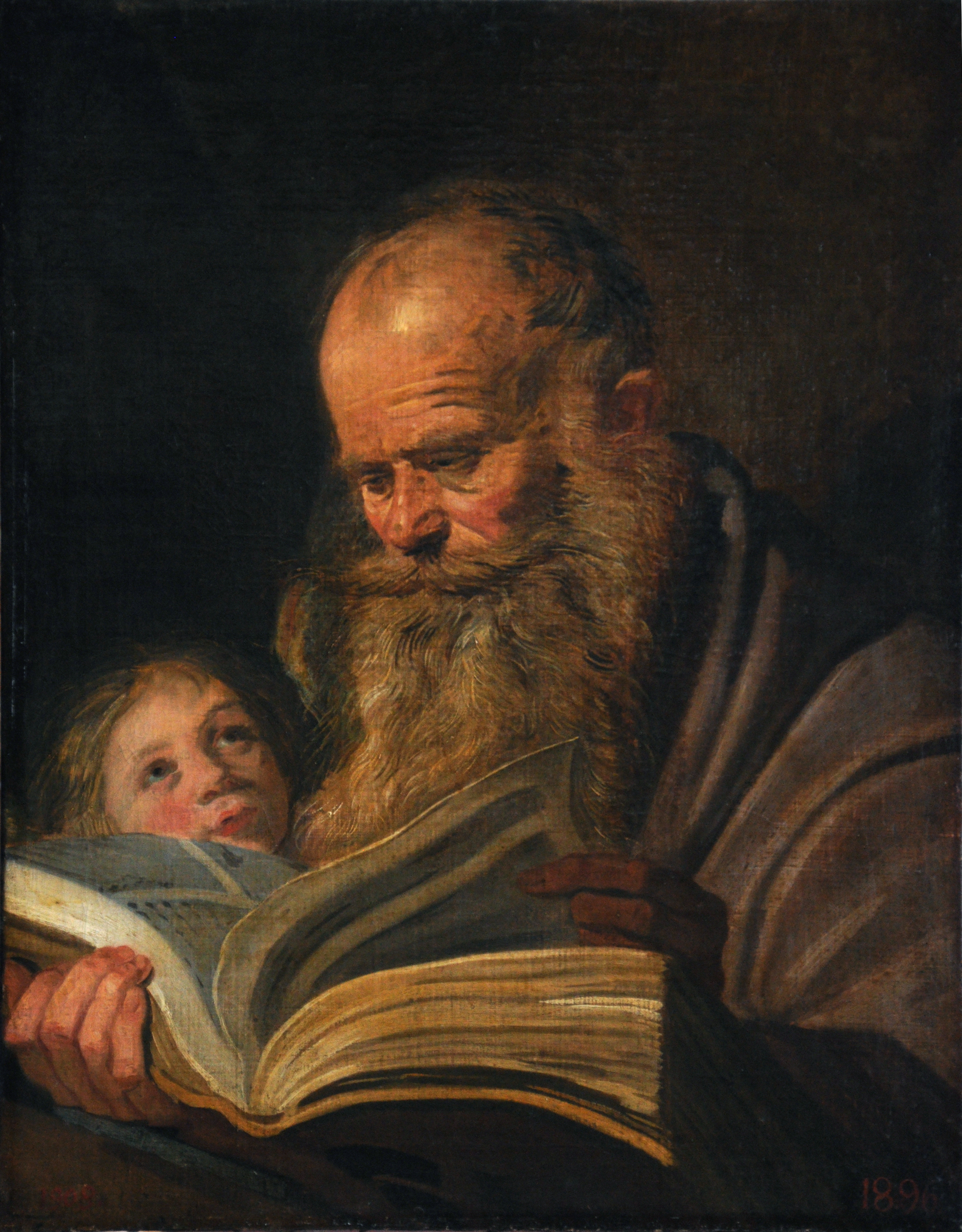
Saint Matthew by Frans Hals, 1625

== See also ==
- List of paintings by Rembrandt
