= Portrait of a Man, probably a Member of the Van Beresteyn Family =

1632 painting by Rembrandt

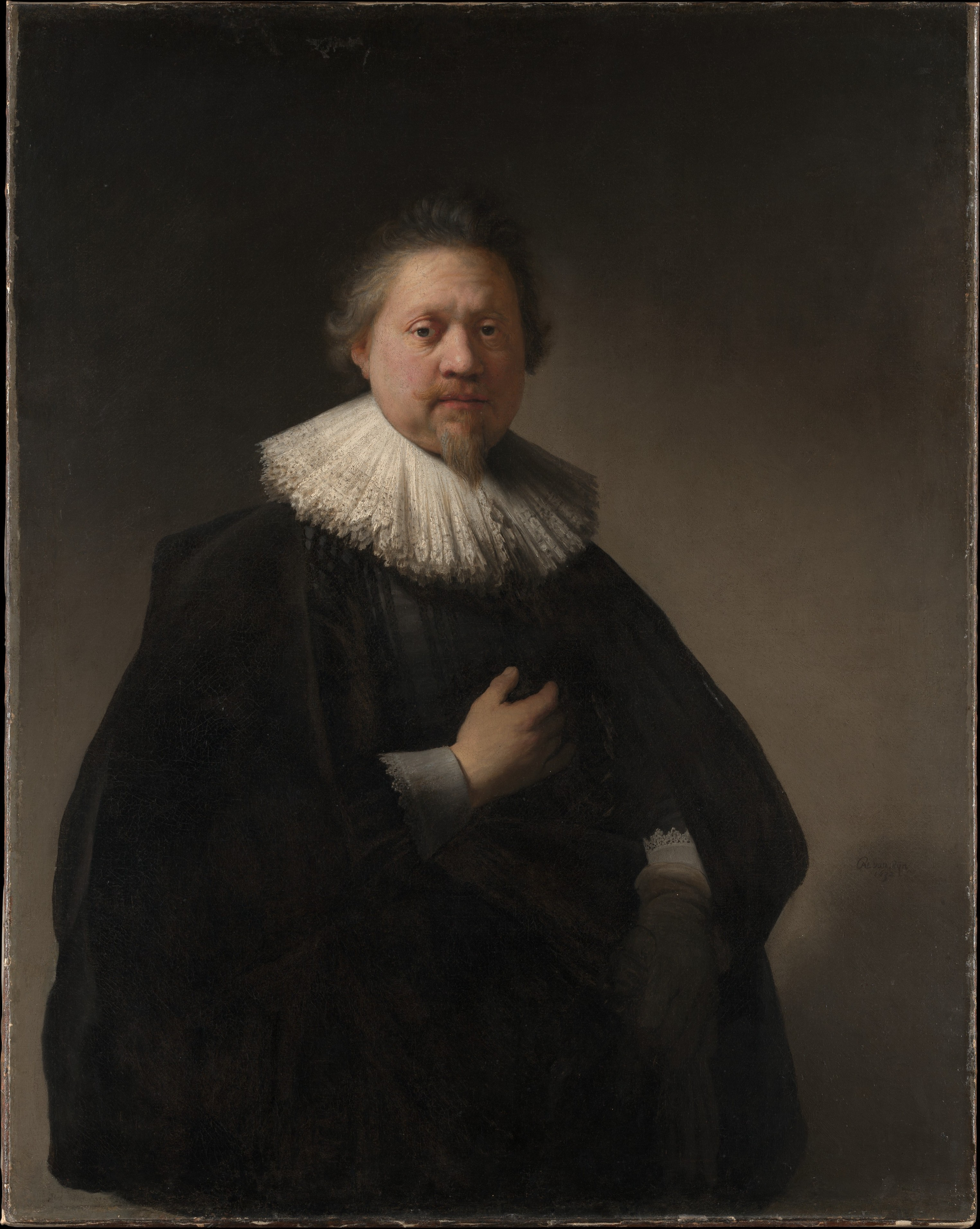
- Year: 1632
- Medium: oil paint, canvas
- Dimensions: 111.8 cm (44.0 in) × 88.9 cm (35.0 in)
- Location: Metropolitan Museum of Art
- Owner: Louisine Havemeyer
- Accession: 29.100.3

Portrait of a Man, probably a Member of the Van Beresteyn Family is an oil-on-canvas 1632 portrait painting by Rembrandt. It shows a man with a lace collar, which was a new fashion in the 1630s replacing older-styled millstone collars. It is pendant to Portrait of a Woman, probably a Member of the Van Beresteyn Family, and both are in the collection of the Metropolitan Museum of Art.

== Description ==
Rembrandt created this painting as a pendant to the MET's portrait of a woman, probably as a wedding pendant. Only a few pairs of pendant portraits by Rembrandt have survived. This pair came into the collection via the Mrs. H. O. Havemeyer bequest in 1929.

This painting was documented by Hofstede de Groot in 1914, who wrote:

624. A MAN OF THE VAN BERESTEYN -VUCHT FAMILY. Dut. 248; Wb. 344; B.-HdG. 82. Three-quarter length; life size. About fifty. He stands, inclined a little to the right, and looks straight before him. He is bare-headed; he has grey hair, combed up high, and a pointed beard. He lays his right hand on his breast; his gloved left hand, grasping the other glove, peeps out of the cloak. He wears a silk coat, striped grey and black, under a black cloak, a close-fitting pleated collar trimmed with lace, and narrow cuffs. Bright light falls from the left at top. Dark grey background, illumined to the right. The picture has suffered from heavy pressure in its transference to a new canvas. Nothing is known as to the identity of the sitter. He may just as well have belonged to some family related through a female line as to the Beresteyn family proper. [Pendant to 625.] Signed on the right in a line with the elbow, "RH L van Ryn 1632"; canvas, 44 1/2 inches by 35 1/2 inches.

Mentioned by Dutuit, p. 53; Michel, p. 119 [91, 443]; Moes, 512. In the collection of the Beresteyn family, Chateau Maurik, Vucht, 1884.

In the collection of the late H. O. Havemeyer, New York.

The painting was included in most Rembrandt catalogs of the 20th century along with its pendant, Portrait of a Woman, probably a Member of the Van Beresteyn Family, which has recently been disputed as autograph. The pendant is, however, still connected with Rembrandt's workshop and time period and is still considered a pendant to this painting. Despite numerous attempts, the provenance does not reach further back than the Havemeyer purchase from Maurick Castle (Chateau Maurik), and as Hofstede de Groot states, the pendants could just as easily have descended in the female line as the male line, and therefore the portrayed couple might not be related to the Beresteyn family at all.

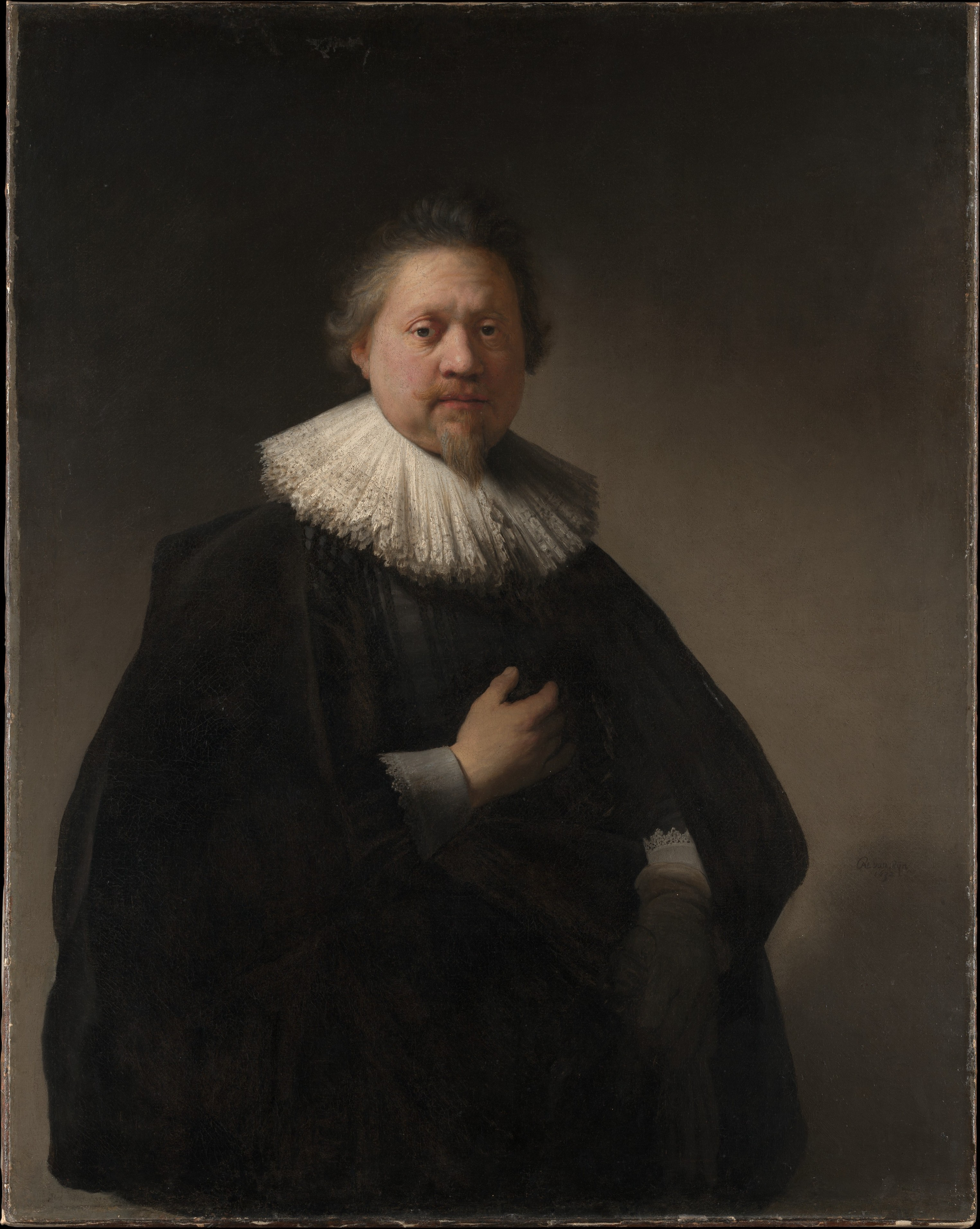
The man's portrait hangs on the left.

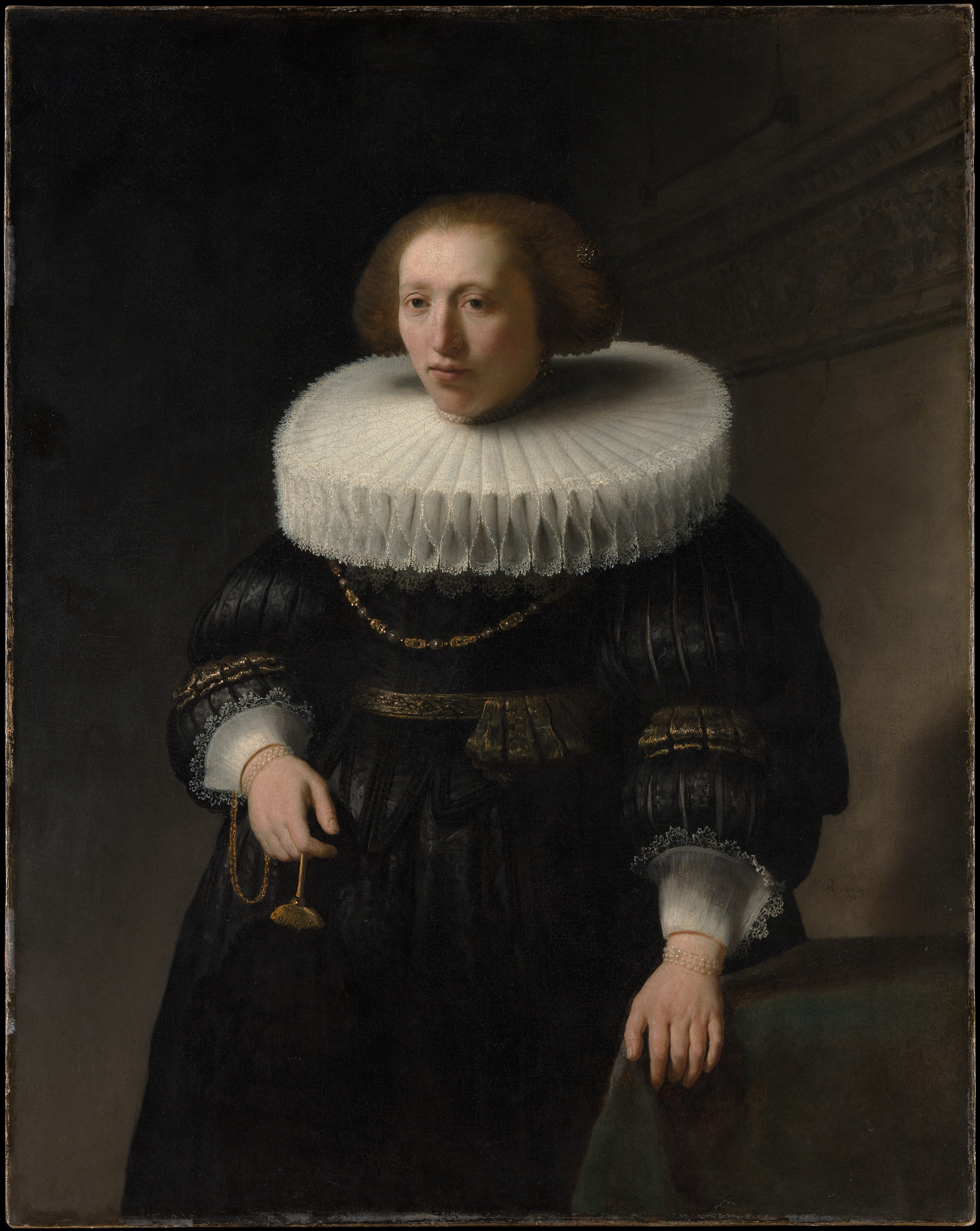
The woman's portrait hangs on the right.

== See also ==
- List of paintings by Rembrandt
