= Portrait of a Woman, probably a Member of the Van Beresteyn Family =

1632 painting by Rembrandt

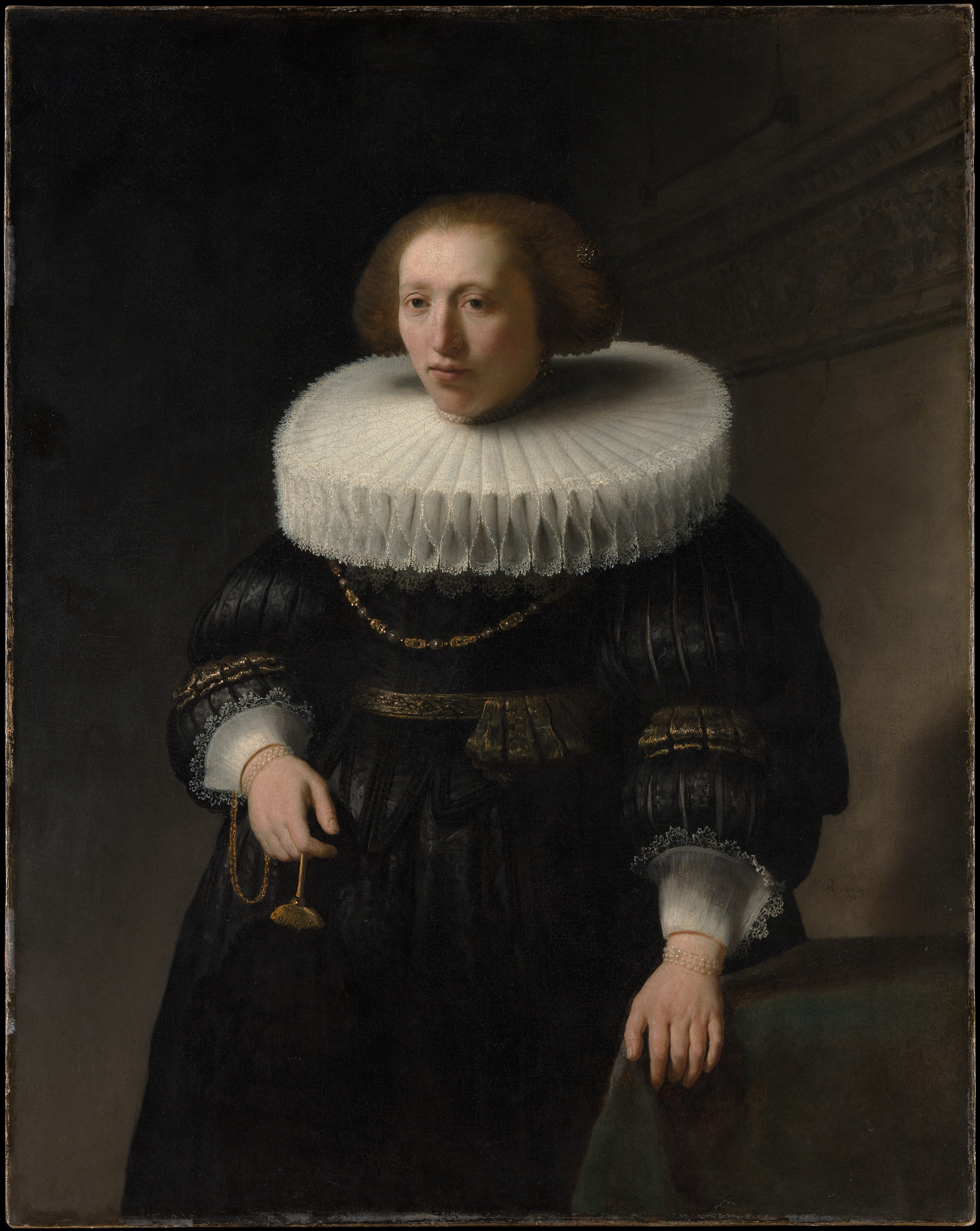
- Artist: Rembrandt
- Year: 1632
- Medium: oil paint, canvas
- Dimensions: 111.8 cm (44.0 in) × 88.9 cm (35.0 in)
- Location: Metropolitan Museum of Art
- Owner: Louisine Havemeyer
- Accession: 29.100.4

Portrait of a Woman, probably a Member of the Van Beresteyn Family is a 1632 oil-on-canvas portrait painting by Rembrandt. A depiction of a woman with an unusually large millstone collar, it is a pendant to Portrait of a Man, probably a Member of the Van Beresteyn Family. Both portraits are in the collection of the Metropolitan Museum of Art.

== Description ==
Rembrandt created this painting as a pendant to the MET's portrait of a man, probably as a wedding pendant. Only a few pairs of pendant portraits by Rembrandt have survived. This pair came into the collection via the Mrs. H. O. Havemeyer bequest in 1929.

This painting was documented by Hofstede de Groot in 1914, who wrote:

625. A LADY OF THE VAN BERESTEYN -VUCHT FAMILY. Dut. 248; Wb. 344; B.-HdG. 83. Three-quarter length; life size. She stands to the left, seen almost in full face, at a table with a greenish-blue cover, on which she rests her left hand. She is of middle age. Her fair but greyish hair, combed well back from the face, is covered at the back with a small cap and fastened with a rosette-headed pin. She wears a flowered black silk gown with slashed and puffed sleeves; she has a greenish-gold girdle, several strings of pearls at her throat and her wrists, a gold chain on her bosom, a broad lace-trimmed ruff over a soft lace collar fitting closely round her neck, and lace-trimmed cuffs. In her right hand she holds a black ostrich-feather fan by a gold chain. Cool light comes from the left. See notes to 624, to which this is a pendant. Signed on the right above the table, "RHL van Ryn 1632"; canvas, 44 1/2 inches by 35 1/2 inches.

Mentioned by Dutuit, p. 53; Michel, p. 119 [91, 443]. In the collection of the Beresteyn family, Chateau Maurik, Vucht, 1884.

In the collection of the late H. O. Havemeyer, New York.

The painting was included in most Rembrandt catalogs of the 20th century, only recently being disputed as autograph by Walter Liedtke, though this is not reflected in the latest RRP catalog. It is, however, still connected with Rembrandt's workshop and time period and is still considered a pendant to its pair. Despite numerous attempts, the provenance does not reach further back than the Havemeyer purchase from Chateau Maurik, and as Hofstede de Groot states in his entry for the male portrait, the pendants could just as easily have descended in the female line as the male line, and therefore the portrayed couple might not be related to the Beresteyn family at all. Considering the shadows on the wall and assuming the portraits were painted at around the same time in the same place, it is possible the woman is quite a bit shorter than the man, but painted to fill the space. This would explain why her collar appears so large, since presumably the standard bleaching and starching molds were used for it as was common for collars of the nobility in 17th-century Amsterdam.

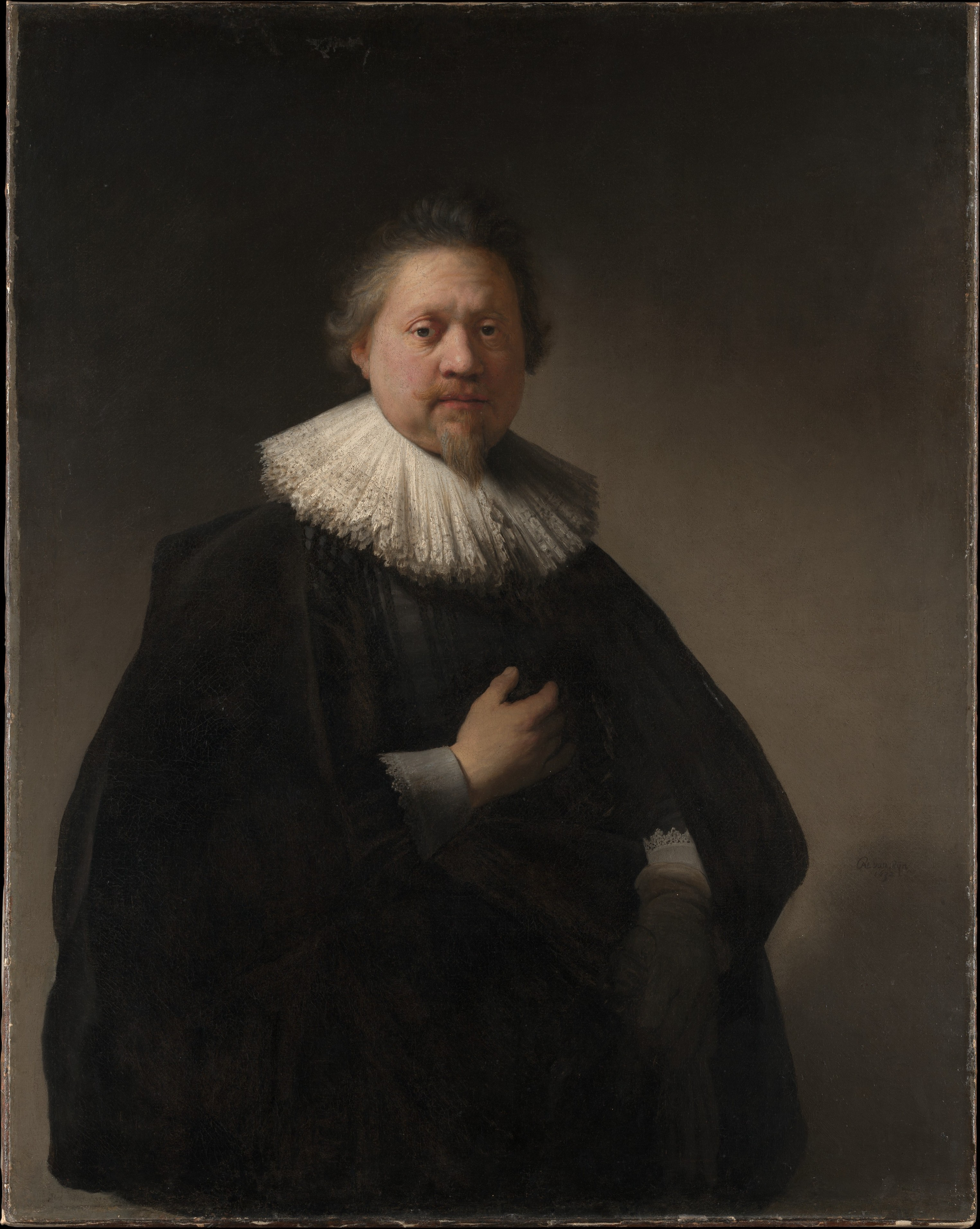
The man's portrait hangs on the left.

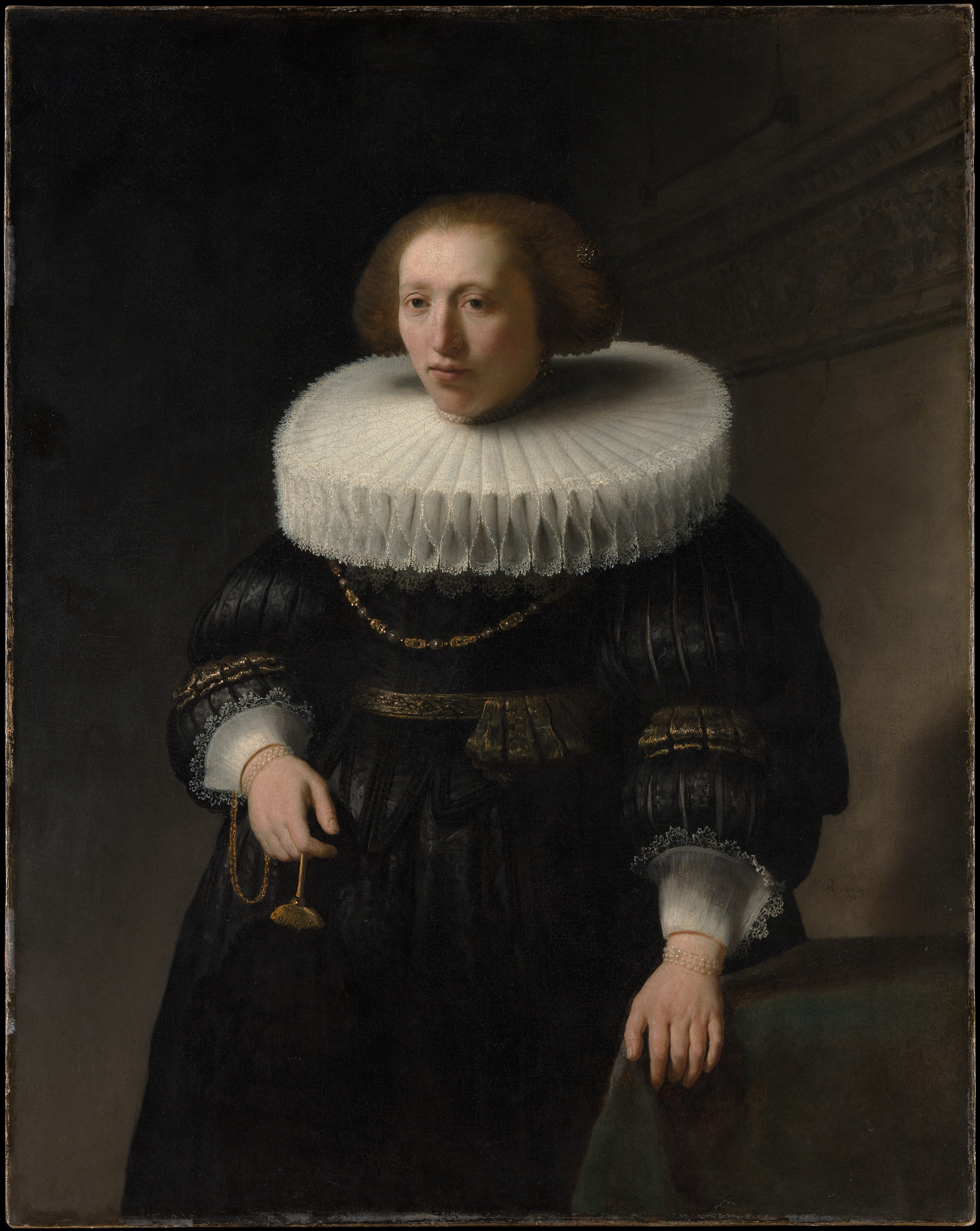
The woman's portrait hangs on the right.

== See also ==
- List of paintings by Rembrandt
