= Old Man with a Gold Chain =

C. 1631 painting by Rembrandt

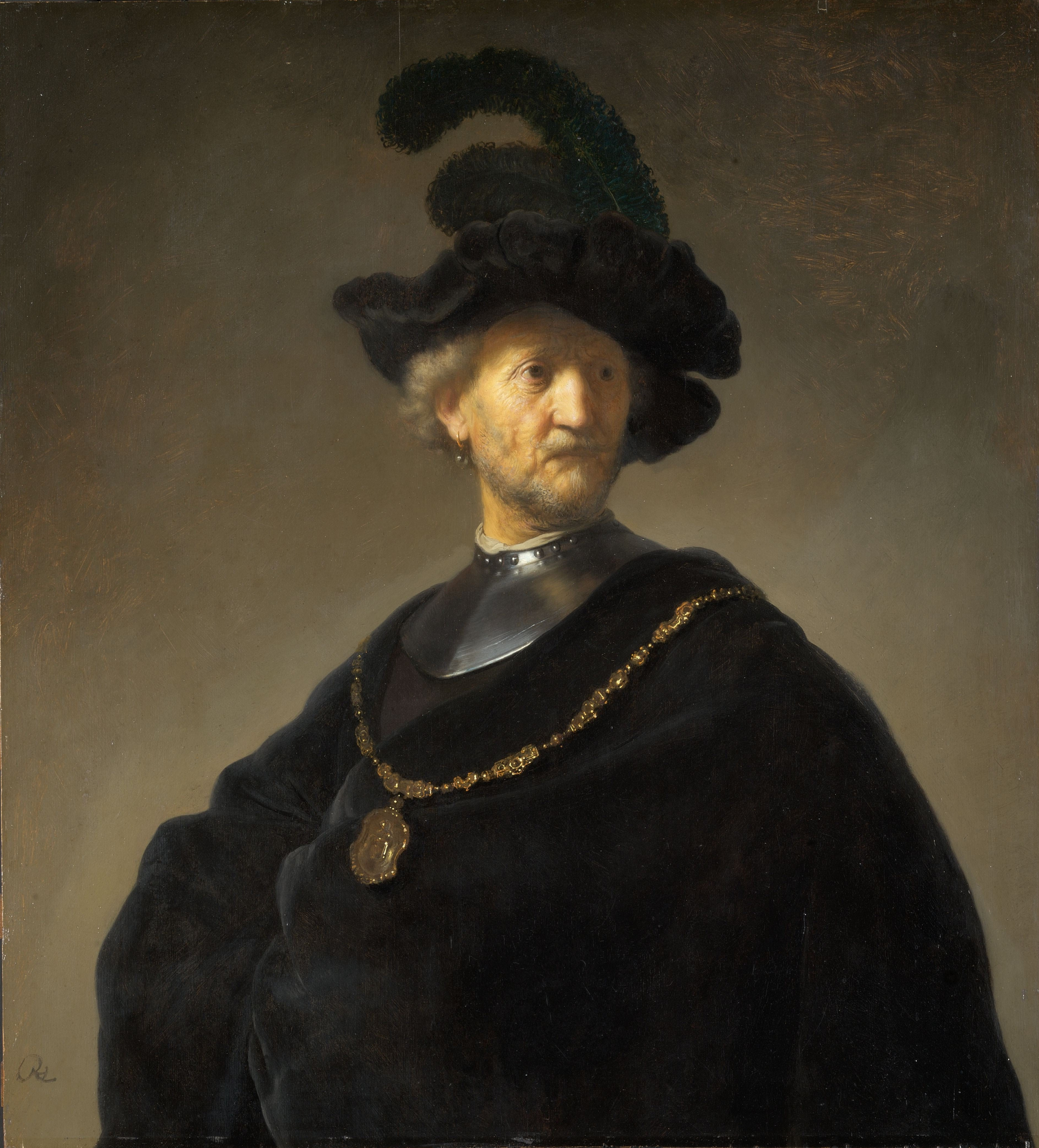
- Artist: Rembrandt
- Year: c. 1631
- Medium: oil on panel
- Dimensions: 83.1 cm × 75.7 cm (32.7 in × 29.8 in)
- Location: Art Institute of Chicago, Chicago

Old Man with a Gold Chain is a portrait by Rembrandt, painted in oil on wooden panel around 1631. It is now in the Art Institute of Chicago.

There are copies including a second version, oil on canvas, which is now considered according to Scholar Gary Schwartz as an Autograph Replica By Rembrandt Van Rijn.

This painting was documented by Hofstede de Groot as a portrait of Rembrandt's father in 1915, who wrote:

675. HARMEN GERRITSZ VAN RIJN. Half-length, without hands; almost life size. He is inclined to the left, but his head and eyes are turned to the right. He wears a dark purple cloak, over which hangs a gold chain with a medallion. Round his neck is a small close-fitting steel gorget. In his right ear is a pearl. He has a short greyish beard, and curly hair covered by a broad-brimmed black hat with two dark ostrich feathers. Painted about 1631. Signed on the left at foot with the monogram "R H L"; canvas, 32 inches by 30 inches.

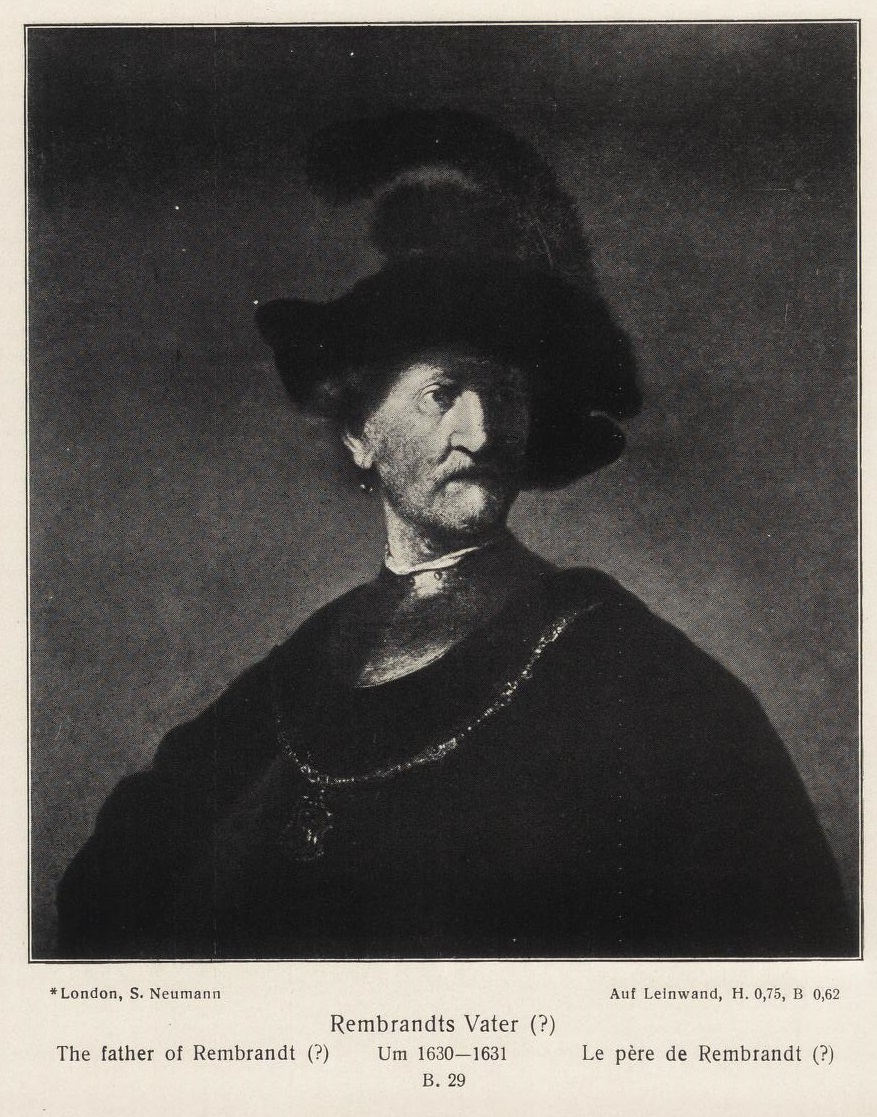
The copy sold by Sedelmeyer was considered the original until 1914.

1. Bode 217; Wb. 156; B.-HdG. 29. Mentioned by Moes, No. 6687, ii; Bode, p. 413; Dutuit, p. 43; Michel, pp. 44, 557, 561 [35, 432, 443]. Sale. Beresford Hope, London, May 1886. In the possession of C. Sedelmeyer, Paris, "Catalogue of 300 Paintings," 1898, No. 111. In the collection of W. H. Beers, New York. In the collection of S. Neumann, London.
2. Sale. Martineau and others, London, March 10, 1902.
3. Panel, 23 1/2 inches by 19 inches. Sale. Causid-Brück of Cassel, Frankfort-on-Main, February 10, 1914, No. 25.

Exhibited at Düsseldorf, 1912, No. 43. Sale. M. P. W. Boulton, London, December 9, 1911, No. 14. In the possession of P. and D. Colnaghi and Obach, London. In the possession of Julius Böhler, Munich. Sale. Marczell von Nemes of Budapest, Paris, June 17, 1913, No. 60 (516,000 francs, S. de Ricci). In the possession of Julius Böhler, Munich. In the possession of Reinhardt, New York. In a private collection, Chicago.

== See also ==
- List of paintings by Rembrandt
