= Portrait of a Man (Rembrandt, New York) =

c. 1657 painting by Rembrandt

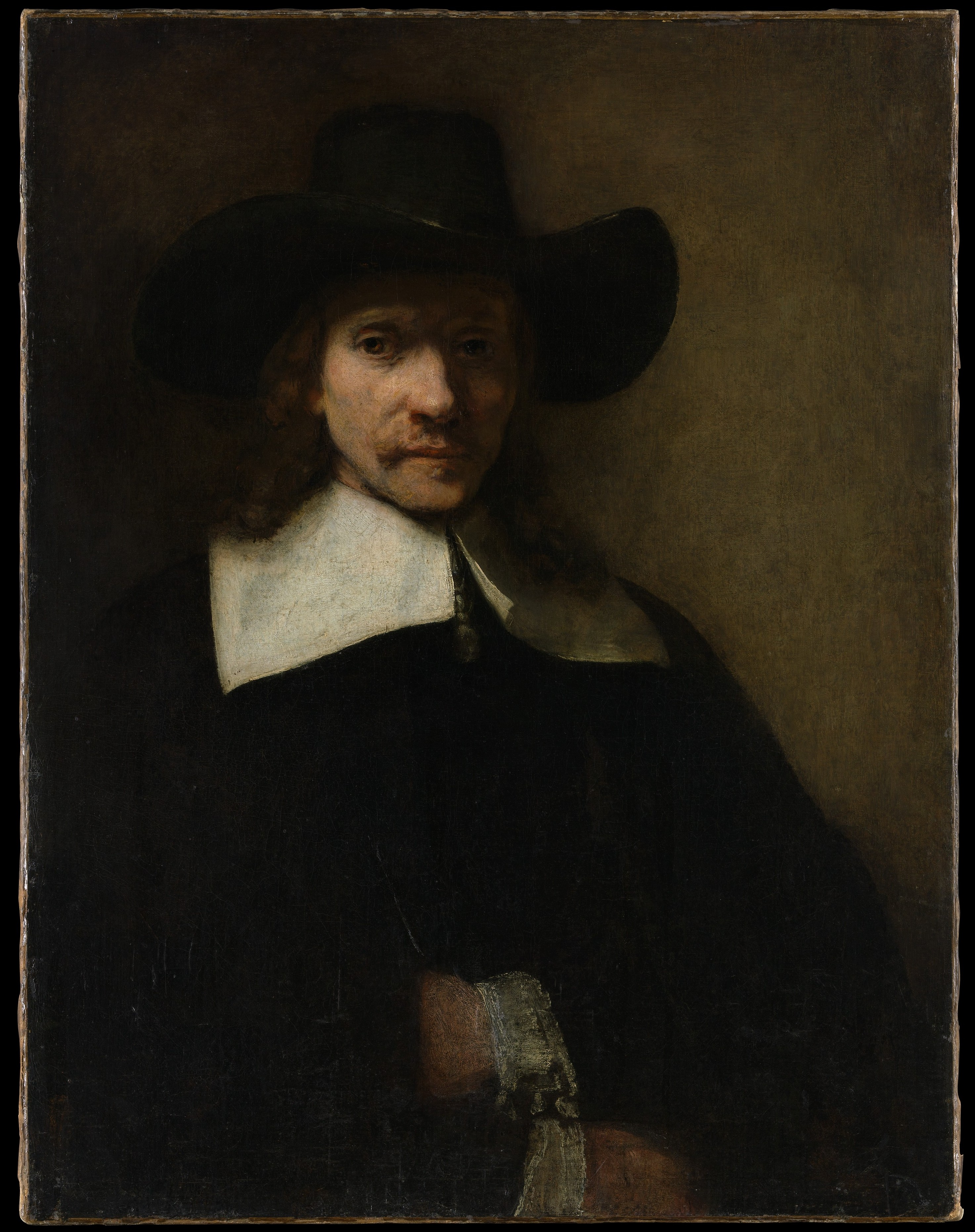
- Artist: Rembrandt
- Year: c. 1655–1660
- Dimensions: 83.5 cm × 64.5 cm (32.9 in × 25.4 in)
- Location: Metropolitan Museum of Art, New York City
- Accession: 91.26.7
- Website: Metropolitan Museum of Art

Portrait of a Man is a c. 1657 portrait painting painted by Rembrandt. It is an oil on canvas and is in the collection of the Metropolitan Museum of Art.

== Description ==
This painting came into the collection via the Henry G. Marquand bequest.

This painting was documented by Hofstede de Groot in 1914, who wrote:

753. A PALE MAN WITH LONG DARK HAIR. Bode 222; Dut. 339; Wb. 209; B.-HdG. 495. About forty. Half-length with one hand; life size. He stands, seen almost in full face, looking straight before him. His left hand is in his black cloak, which envelopes the figure. He wears a large, smooth, close-fitting collar with tassels and a high broad-brimmed black hat. He has a slight moustache, is partly shaven, and has dark eyes. The light falls from the left on the right side of the face and the collar. The background is illumined to the left. Signed in full, and dated 1664; canvas, 31 1/2 inches by 25 inches. Mentioned by Bode, pp. 531, 588; Dutuit, p. 46; Michel, p. 442]. Exhibited at the Hudson-Fulton Celebration, Metropolitan Museum, New York, 1909, No. 107. In the collection of the Marquess of Lansdowne, London, 1883. In the collection of H. G. Marquand, New York; given by him in 1890 to the Museum.

Despite extensive research, the sitter and earlier owners of this painting are unknown. Surface examination has shown that the date Hofstede de Groot saw had disappeared by the 1950s, and the overall condition of the painting is rather abraded. The shading of the eyes under the hat is characteristic of Rembrandt's work in the 1650s.

== See also ==
- List of paintings by Rembrandt
