= The Stone Bridge =

1637 painting by Rembrandt

- Landscape with a Stone Bridge
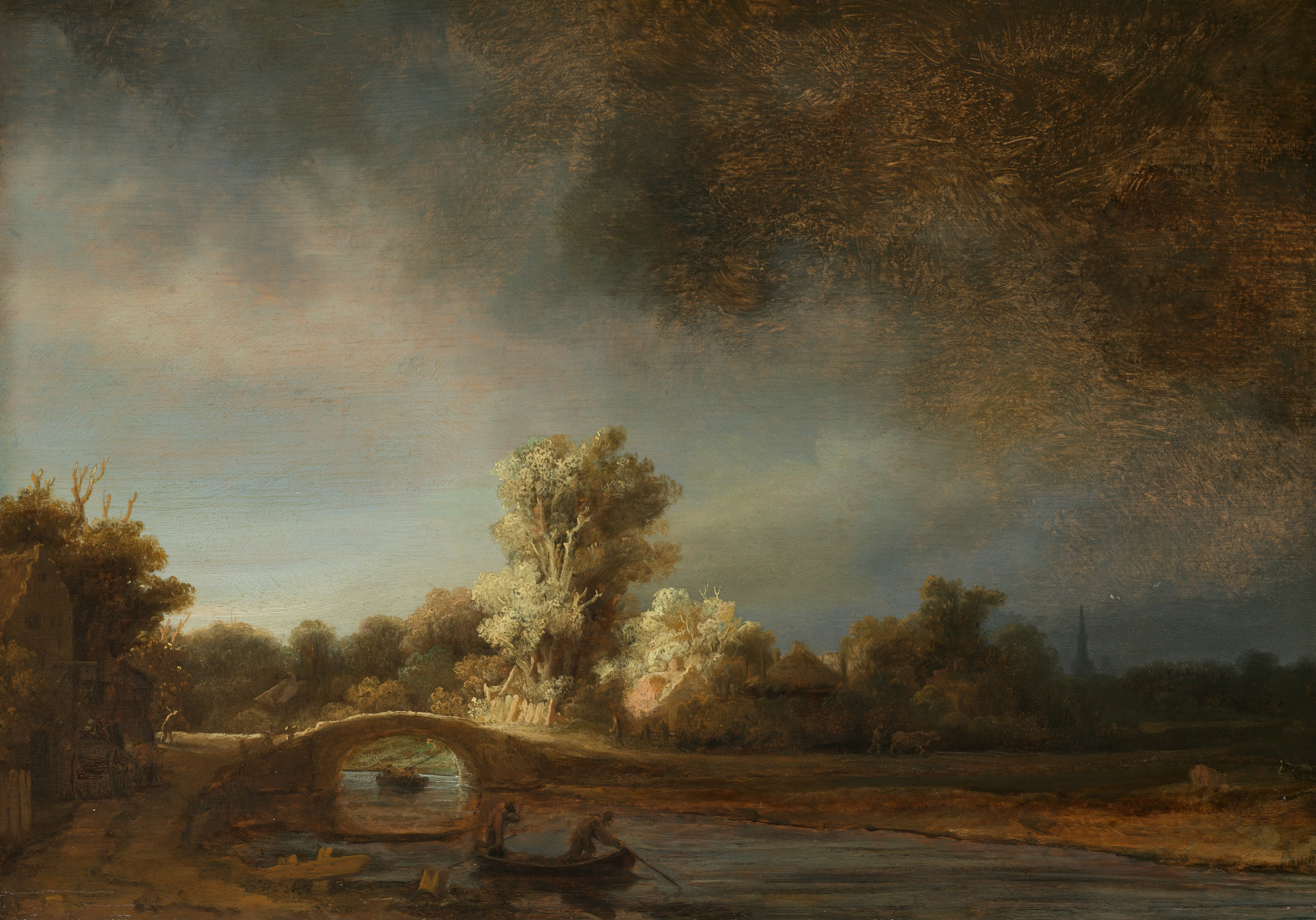
- Artist: Rembrandt
- Year: c. 1638
- Catalogue: Rembrandt Research Project, A Corpus of Rembrandt Paintings VI: #175
- Medium: oil paint, panel
- Dimensions: 29.5 cm (11.6 in) × 42.5 cm (16.7 in)
- Location: Rijksmuseum, Netherlands
- Owner: Abraham Bredius, Henry Petty-Fitzmaurice, 5th Marquess of Lansdowne, Henry Petty-Fitzmaurice, 4th Marquess of Lansdowne, Henry Petty-Fitzmaurice, 3rd Marquess of Lansdowne

The Stone Bridge is a 1637 landscape painting by the Dutch Golden Age painter Rembrandt in the collection of the Rijksmuseum.

== Painting ==
This painting was documented by Hofstede de Groot in 1915, who wrote:

939. A HIGH STONE BRIDGE. Sm. 612; Bode 143; Dut. 447; Wb. 212; B-HdG. 232. Near an inn with a red gable, a high stone bridge leads in a wide curve across a canal, which runs from the left towards the front. On the far side is a farm with a hay-rick amid trees; farther away is a church-tower. In front of the inn is a rustic waggon, seen from the back, with persons in it. On the road is a peasant driving a cow from left to right; in the immediate foreground to the right is another cow. Several other figures are near the bridge. Under the bridge is a boat; another is in front of it, with two men, one of whom poles the boat forward. Dark sky; a bright ray of sunshine illumines the clump of trees and the buildings among them. Painted almost entirely in brown and grey. Painted about 1637–38.
Oak panel, 11 1/2 inches by 16 inches. Mentioned by Bode, pp. 492, 579; Dutuit, p. 46; Michel, p. 314 [239]; Waagen, iii. 164.
Exhibited at the Royal Academy Winter Exhibition, London, 1899, No. 35 [by J. Reiss].
Sale. Lapeyrière, Paris, April 14, 1817, No. 3 (E. Gray); see Buchanan, ii. 298.
In the collection of James Gray, Versailles, 1863.
In the collection of the Marquess of Lansdowne, Bowood, 1883.
Sale. James Reiss, London, May 12, 1900, No. 63 (2205, Rijksmuseum).
In the Rijksmuseum, Amsterdam, 1911 catalogue, No. 2020."

The picture is currently documented as being in the collection of Augustin Lapeyrière, based presumably on the Hofstede de Groot catalog. Before him, Smith wrote:

612. A View in Holland, exhibiting a landscape diversified with meadows, clusters of trees, and cottages, and traversed by a canal crossed by a bridge. Several boats containing passengers are on the water, and a waggon and horses are seen passing along a road on the left.

11 in. by 1 foot 4 in.— P.

Collection of M. Perrier, ... 1817. . 1507 fs. 60l.

Probably M. Perrier refers to Augustin Lapeyrière, because it was sold on 14 April 1817, lot nr. 46, in Paris. The auction catalogue of May 12, 1900, stated that it was in the collection of James Gray of Versailles in 1863, which Hofstede de Groot repeated. Since Waagen had seen the painting in the collection of the Marquess of Landsdowne in 1850, this was however impossible.

== See also ==
- List of paintings by Rembrandt
- Landscape with Arched Bridge, a similar painting in the collection of the Gemäldegalerie, Berlin

== Sources ==
- Landscape with a stone bridge in the Rembrandt database
