= Landscape with Arched Bridge =

Painting by Rembrandt

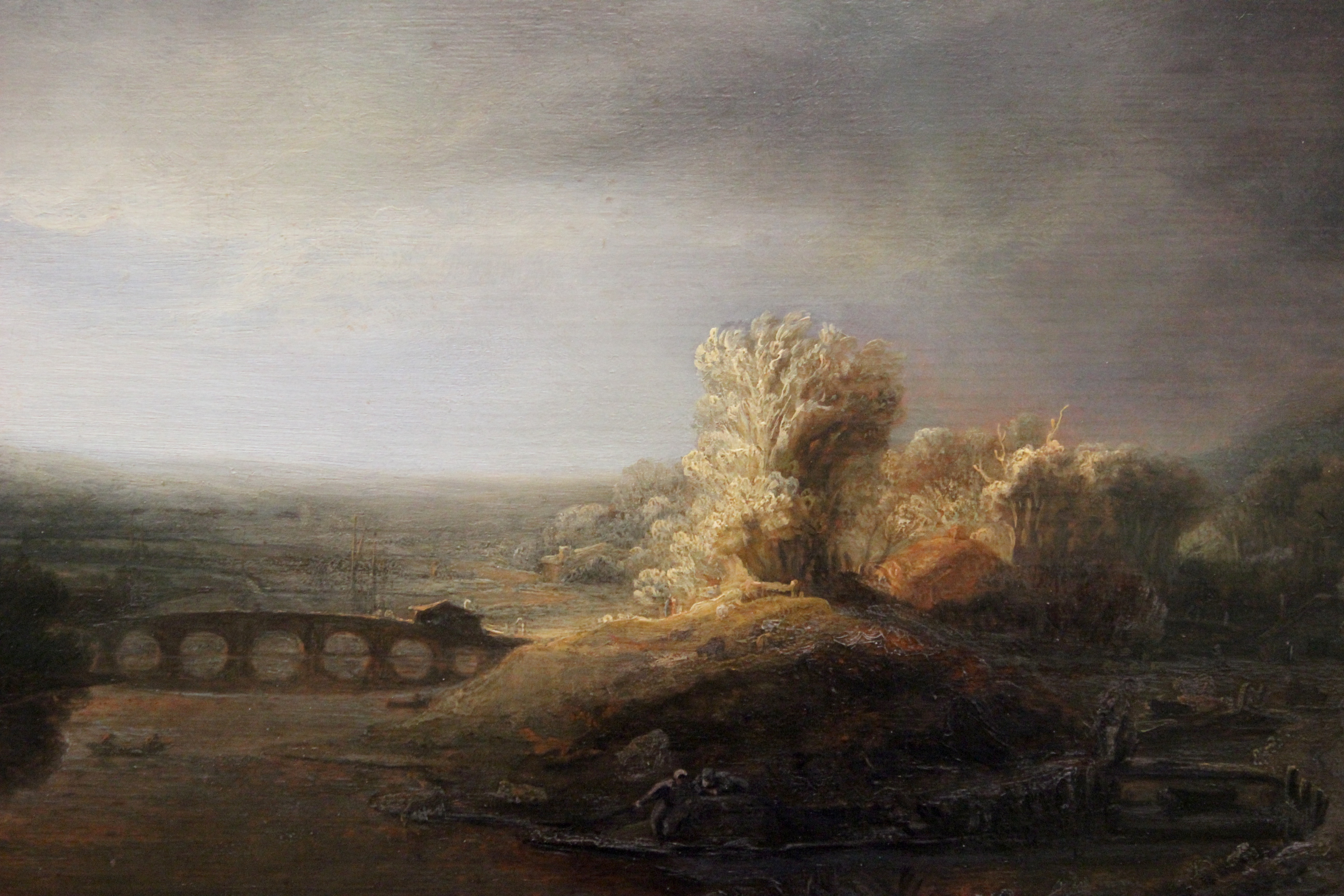
- Landscape with Arched Bridge
- Artist: Rembrandt
- Year: c. 1637–1638
- Medium: Oil on panel
- Dimensions: 30.1 cm × 42.3 cm (11.9 in × 16.7 in)
- Location: Gemäldegalerie, Berlin

Landscape with Arched Bridge is a circa 1637–1638 landscape painting by the Dutch Golden Age painter Rembrandt in the collection of the Gemäldegalerie, Berlin.

== Painting ==
This painting was documented by Hofstede de Groot in 1915, who wrote:

951. A STORM OVER A RIVER LANDSCAPE. Bode 117; Dut. 448; Wb. 113; B-HdG. 234. A river, coming from wooded hills on the right, turns in front to the left and loses itself in the level distance. In the right foreground is a rustic wooden bridge; in the left middle distance is a stone bridge of seven arches with a bridge-house. Beyond the bridge lie seven boats with tall masts; in front of it are some rowing-boats. In the foreground stands an angler. On the farther bank, on a projecting tongue of land in the centre, is a dense clump of trees in full sunlight. A group of houses to the right lies in the shadow of a storm-cloud coming up from the right. Painted about 1640.
Oak panel, 11 1/2 inches by 16 inches. Mentioned by Vosmaer, pp. 310, 534; Bode, pp. 492, 574; Dutuit, p. 51; Michel, p. 314, 554 [239, 439]; Bode, Oldenburg Gallery, p. 34; Bredius and Schmidt Degener, Oldenburg Gallery, p. 13.
In the Oldenburg Gallery, 1890 catalogue, No. 197; bought in 1801"

The picture was purchased a decade later for the museum by Bode himself as curator in 1924 when the former Grand Duke of Oldenburg's Gallery was sold. It is the same size and manner of The Stone Bridge of the Rijksmuseum and was long considered a later copy by Rembrandt pupil Govert Flinck but a recent dendrochronological study has shown that the Berlin panel predates the Amsterdam panel, dismissing the idea it could be a copy.

== See also ==
- List of paintings by Rembrandt

== Sources ==
- Landscape with a seven arched bridge, c. 1638 in the RKD
