= Lucretia (Rembrandt, 1666) =

1666 painting by Rembrandt

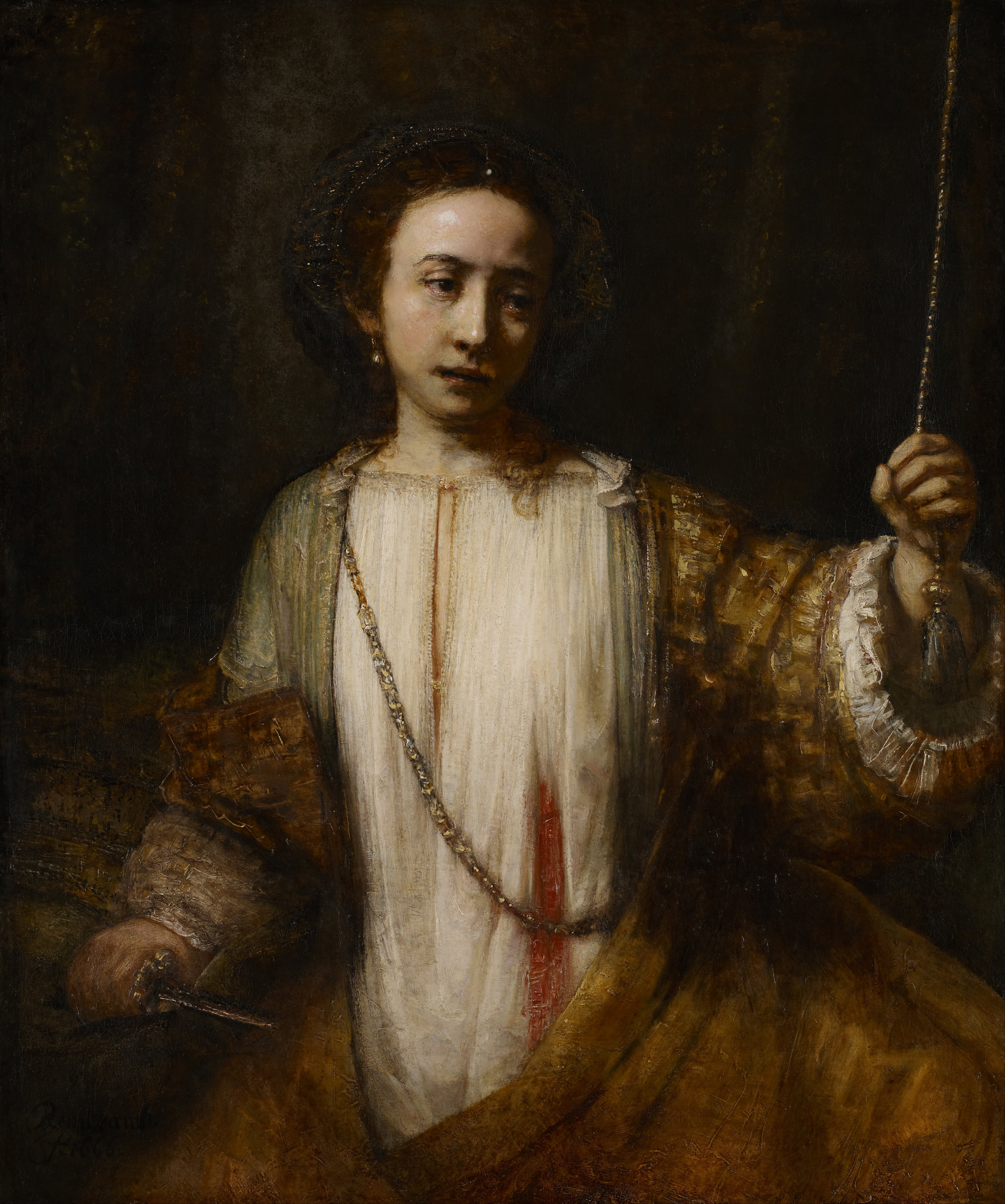
- Lucretia
- Artist: Rembrandt
- Year: 1666
- Catalogue: 314 (Rembrandt Research Project, A Corpus of Rembrandt Paintings VI)
- Medium: Oil on canvas
- Dimensions: 110.2 cm × 92.3 cm (43.4 in × 36.3 in)
- Location: Minneapolis Institute of Art; Minneapolis

Lucretia is a 1666 history painting by the Dutch Golden Age painter Rembrandt Harmenszoon van Rijn. It is an oil painting on canvas that depicts a myth about a woman named Lucretia who lived during the ancient Roman eras. She committed suicide to defend her honor after being raped by an Etruscan king's son. For her self-sacrifice she is known as a heroine to the Romans, who celebrated the ideals of virtue and chastity.

The painting is in the collection of the Minneapolis Institute of Art.

== History ==
Lucretia was a popular subject for artists during the Baroque period. Rembrandt was one of the many Dutch artists who carried the story throughout Northern Europe. It has been suggested by Svetlana Alpers that there is a significant link to the painting and his mistress Hendrickje Stoffels. In 1663, when he portrayed her as Bathsheba, Hendrickje had been chastised for "living like a whore", by the Dutch Reformed Church when she gave birth to their illegitimate daughter, Cornelia van Rijn. She shared the guilt of the reified and sexually compromised woman which limited their position within patriarchy.

Rembrandt never married Hendrickje because a provision in the will of his first wife, Saskia van Uylenburgh, threatened his income. He was not allowed to remarry if he wanted to inherit her fortune or see their son, Titus. Titus was the sole survivor out of three children, two of whom died shortly after birth. After the death of his wife in 1642, he hired a wet-nurse, Geertje Dircx to care for Titus. Rembrandt and Dircx soon became lovers and their relationship lasted several years. When they split, a court case for "breach of promise" arose. She had expected to marry him, after he had given her a ring belonging to his deceased wife. Rembrandt promised to pay a settlement to Dircx, on the condition that she would not change her will, which named Titus as her heir. After years of blackmailing Rembrandt, in 1650, Geertje was sent to a woman's house of correction.

During the trial, Rembrandt hired Hendrickje as a housekeeper, and she became his new mistress. Even though Hendrickje and Rembrandt never married, she became his longtime partner and remained together up till Hendrickje's death. Alpers noted the patriarchal motives underlying the 1666 painting may be Rembrandt's guilt for not marrying Hendrickje, and the displacement of his domestic life. He knew of Hendrickje's experience and pain and used her as "Lucretia" to explore the full humanity of a woman – a tragic object of desire.

== Description ==
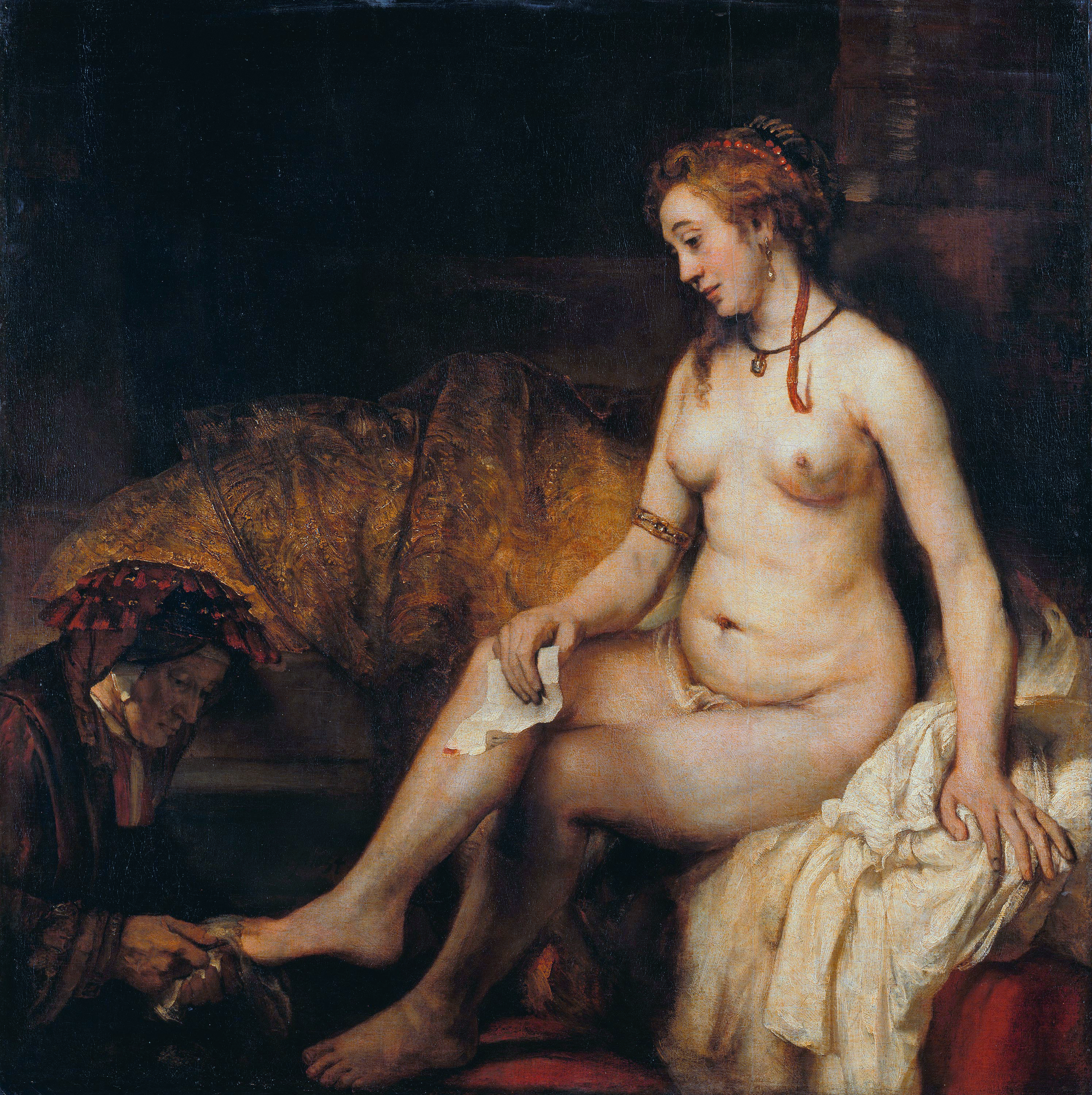
Rembrandt's Bathsheba at Her Bath, 1654

In this depiction of Lucretia, she is wearing an ornate gold dress and pearl earrings, indicating her status as a woman of wealth. Her dress is somewhat disarrayed, exposing her under garment. The fabric of her undergarment is stained with blood, signifying her own acceptance of impending death. In her right hand, she grips the dagger which has caused the wound to her heart, while the left hand is gripping what appears to be a bed tassel. This depiction of Lucretia is not supposed to represent idealised beauty, rather, it accentuates the anguish she is experiencing after losing her honour. Her face embodies her despair and hopelessness, her skin is pale, and her lips are small and express her grief.

== Subject ==
This painting depicts an ancient Roman legend written by Roman historian Livy, who covered the period from early Rome through to the reign of Augustus. During the ancient Roman and Greek era, legends of women committing suicide to keep their virtue pure were popular. It was a way to promote feminine ideals to women. As the legend goes, Lucretia was a noblewoman who was married to Lucius. While her husband was out doing his duty, her husband's friend Sextus and few of his men went to visit her. They wanted to see which man had the most virtuous wife. Lucretia graciously hosted her husband's guests, and as nightfall came all the men left, except Sextus. He was determined to have Lucretia for himself. After a couple of days had passed, he went back and told her she either sleep with him, or be killed with her servant, to be framed as an affair gone wrong.

The next day, she sent a letter to her father, Lucretius, and her husband. When they arrived, she explained what had happened to her. She considered death as the only suitable punishment for her losing her chastity and value as a wife, by being raped. She stabbed herself.

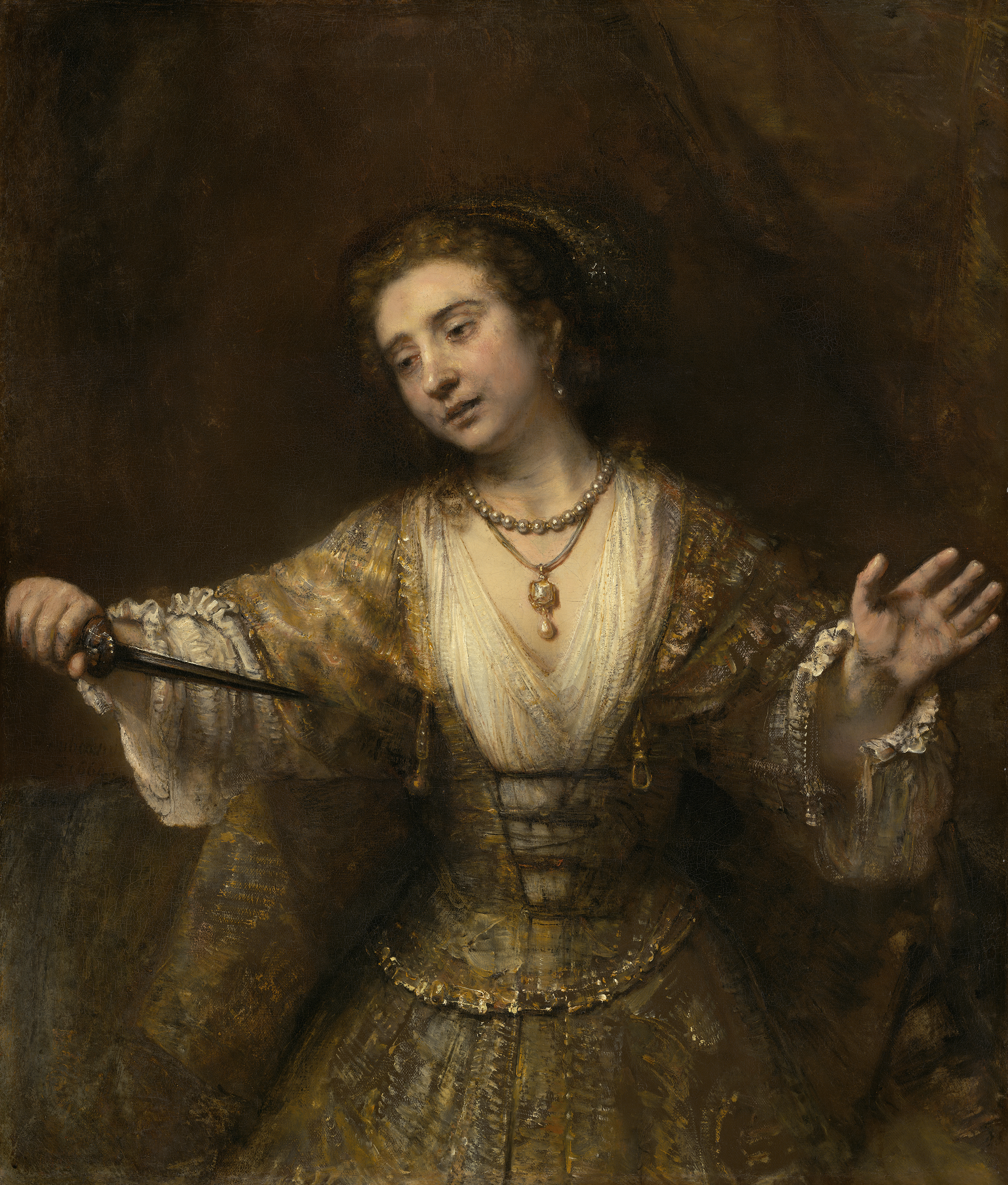
Rembrandt's Lucretia, 1664

== Similar work ==
Rembrandt painted another depiction of Lucretia in 1664, now in the National Gallery of Art. It follows the iconographic tradition which shows Lucretia clutching the dagger before she stabbed herself. Rembrandt was known to have used family and friends as models for his paintings; the 1664 Lucretia is in the likeness of his daughter-in-law Magdalena Van Loo.

There has been speculation by Sir Lawrence Gowing that the 1666 figure is not Lucretia, but in fact another Roman heroine, Arria, who stabbed herself to encourage her husband, Paetus, who was sentenced to death by suicide.

== Influence ==
Caravaggio's influence spread to the Netherlands and provided adaptation of figural postures, structural principle and dark shadows. Caravaggio's style often included illuminated figures, spot-lit, emerging from surrounding shadow – a technique called tenebrism. Rembrandt borrowed influence from this style of artwork, evident in Lucretia; she is illuminated as the focus of the painting. The dark shadowing on her face and the dark background pull her towards the viewer. There is evidence that Rembrandt pulled inspiration from Caravaggio's compositions, especially Caravaggio's David, in the case of Rembrandt's Lucretia. The head and body's composition are similar: both have their head slightly tiled to an angle, both forms end below the waist, horizontal marks on Lucretia dress may mirror David's bone structure, and Lucretia's chain across her dress is similar to the line of David's shirt. While David is holding the head of Goliath, the Rembrandt shows Lucretia holding her bed tassel. Recent scholarship and exhibitions have unearthed striking connections between Rembrandt and Caravaggio. Art historian Jeremy Caniglia published a study in 2020 that uses x-rays, palette comparisons and overlay analysis technology to show how Rembrandt created Lucretia as a feminized copy of Caravaggio's David.

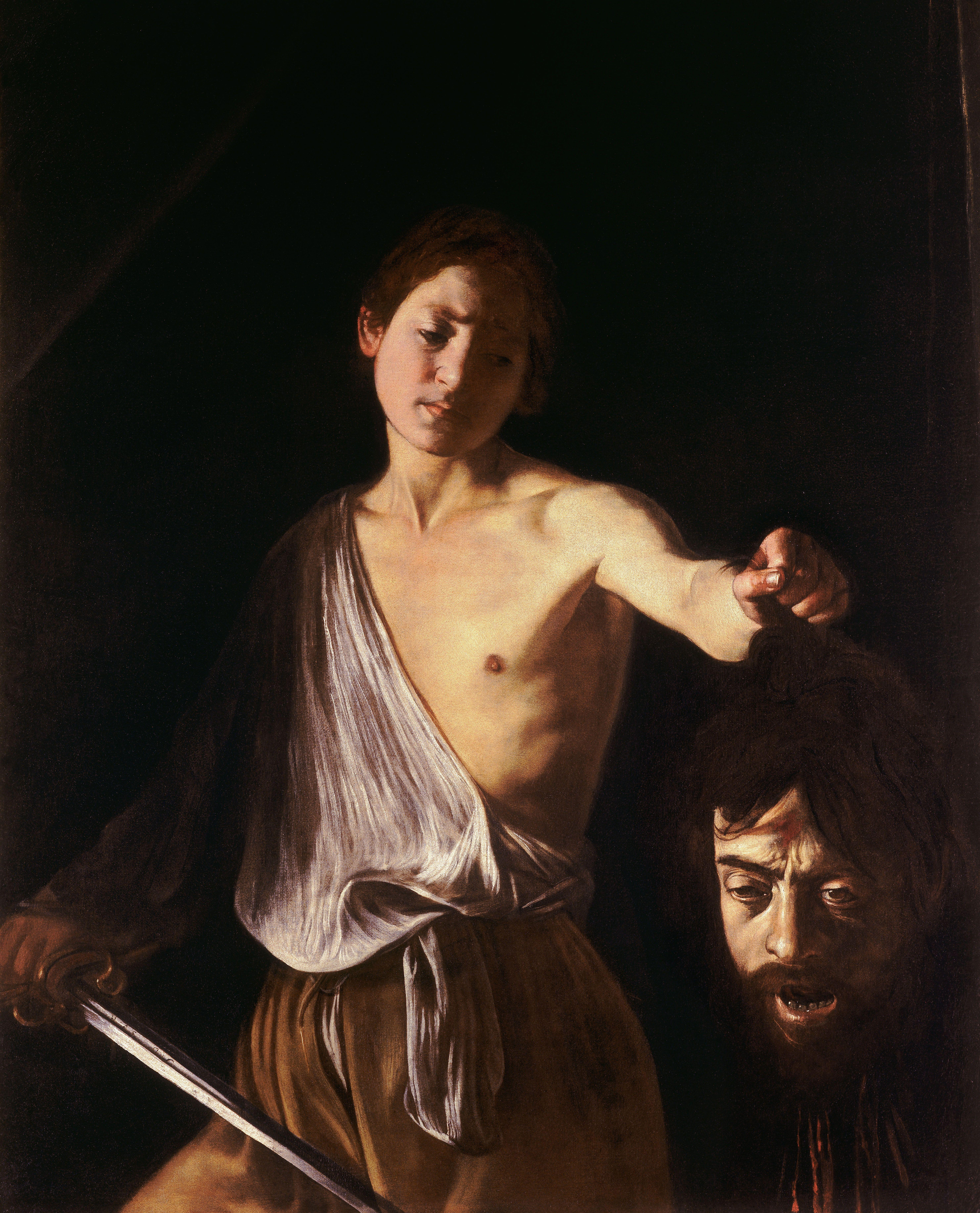
Caravaggio, David with the Head of Goliath

== Provenance ==
- Private collection Jean-Baptiste Wiscar, Lille/Rome
  - possibly part of the collection of Jean-Baptist, by Nov. 1802 (Biikker/Schapelhouman/Krekeler 2014, online supplement p.21-22)
- Private collection Michal Hieronim Radziwill, Nieborów
  - Private collection
- Private Collection John Calvert Wombwell, London (England)
  - 1853-06-04 date of auction
- Private Collection William W. Burdon, Newcastle upon Tyne
  - 1853-06-04 – 1862-06-28 date of auction
- Private Collection J. Purvis Carter, London/Florence
  - 1877-after 1877 (Hudson 1969, no.21)
- Reinhardt Galleries, New York City
  - 1926-1926 (Judson 1969, no.21)
- Private Collection H.V. Jones, Minneapolis (Minnesota)
  - 1928-1927/1928 (Weller et al. 2011, no.50)
- Private Collection Lydia Augusta Jones, Minneapolis (Minnesota)
  - Descent from her husband Herschel V. Jones
- Minneapolis Institute of Art, Minneapolis (Minnesota)
  - 1934 –

== See also ==
- List of paintings by Rembrandt
