= Alfred von Wurzbach =

Austrian art critic

Alfred Wurzbach Ritter von Tannenberg
- Born: 22 July 1846 Lemberg, Austrian Empire
- Died: 18 May 1915 (aged 68) Vienna, Austria-Hungary
- Occupation: Art critic and historian
- Subject: Biography

Alfred Wurzbach Ritter von Tannenberg (22 July 1846 – 18 May 1915) was an Austrian art critic.

== Biography ==
He was born on 22 July 1846 in Lemberg, Austrian Empire (now Lviv, Ukraine). He was the son of Constantin von Wurzbach. He studied jurisprudence in Vienna and entered the civil service, but resigned in 1876 and devoted himself entirely to the study of art history. He was art critic for the Wiener Allgemeine Zeitung from 1881 to 1886.

He died in Vienna on 18 May 1915.

== Works ==
Under the title Zeitgenossen he published a series of biographical sketches (1871–72), and afterwards the monograph Martin Schongauer (1881), a Geschichte der holländischen Malerei (History of Dutch painting, 1885), besides biographies of Dutch and Flemish painters in Dohme's Kunst und Künstler (Art and artists, 1876). He also edited dictionaries of artist biographies, and compiled Rembrandt-Galerie (1885), and translated Houbraken's The Great Theatre of Dutch Painters (original Dutch edition 1718).

- Laura: Eine Novelle in Versen, 1873
- Die französischen Maler des 18. Jahrhunderts (French painters of the 18th century), 1879
- Grosse Schouburgh der niederländischen Maler und Malerinnen, 1879
- Die goldene Bibel (The golden Bible), 1880
- Rembrandt-Galerie: Eine Auswahl von hundert Gemälden, 1886
- Niederländisches Künstler-Lexikon, three volumes, 1911
