= François Émile Michel =

French painter

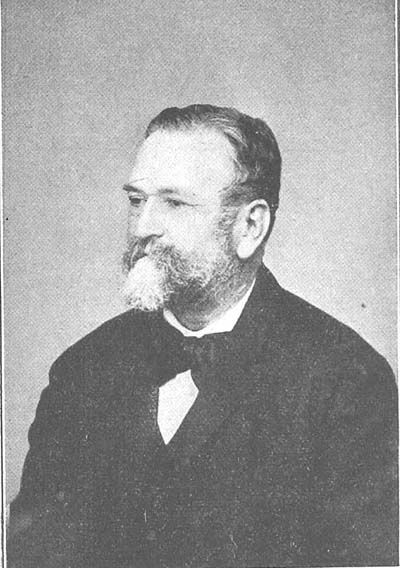
François Émile Michel, 1906

François Émile Michel (19 July 1828 – 23 May 1909) was a French painter, art critic and art historian.

Born in Metz, Michel became a student of Auguste Migette and Laurent-Charles Maréchal, the stained glass painter, and began to exhibit in 1853. Among Michel's masterpieces are Une Gardense d'Oies (1853) and Unit d'ete (1872). He wrote for the Gazette des Beaux-Arts and other periodicals. His most famous book is on the life and works of Rembrandt. His other books include Les Brueghel and Paul Potter. He was elected a member of the Institut de France in 1892. He died in Paris.

== Paintings ==
- Bords de la Couse à Saillan, musée de Soissons
- Dans la lande, Palais des Beaux-Arts de Lille
- Le Torrent de Cerveyrieux dans l'Ain, Musée Antoine Vivenel
- Semailles d'automne, musée du Louvre

== Publications ==
- La Forêt de Fontainebleau dans la nature, dans l’histoire, dans la littérature et dans l’art, Renouard, Paris, 1909.
- Les Maîtres du paysage, Hachette, Paris, 1906.
- The Masters of Landscape Painting, Heinemann, London, 1910.
- Essais sur l’histoire de l’art, Société d’édition artistique, Paris, 1900.
- Rubens, sa vie, son œuvre et son temps, Hachette, Paris, 1900.
- Rembrandt. Sa vie, son œuvre et son temps, Hachette, paris, 1893.
- Jacob van Ruysdael et les Paysagistes de l’École de Harlem, Librairie de l’art, Paris, 1892.
- Les Brueghel. Paris : Librairie de l’art, 1892
- Hobbéma et les Paysagistes de son temps en Hollande, Librairie de l’art, Paris, 1890.
- Le Musée de Cologne. Paris : J. Rouam, 1884.
- Étude historique et critique sur le musée de peinture de la ville de Metz, Blanc, Metz, 1868.
