= Eugène Dutuit =

French politician and art collector

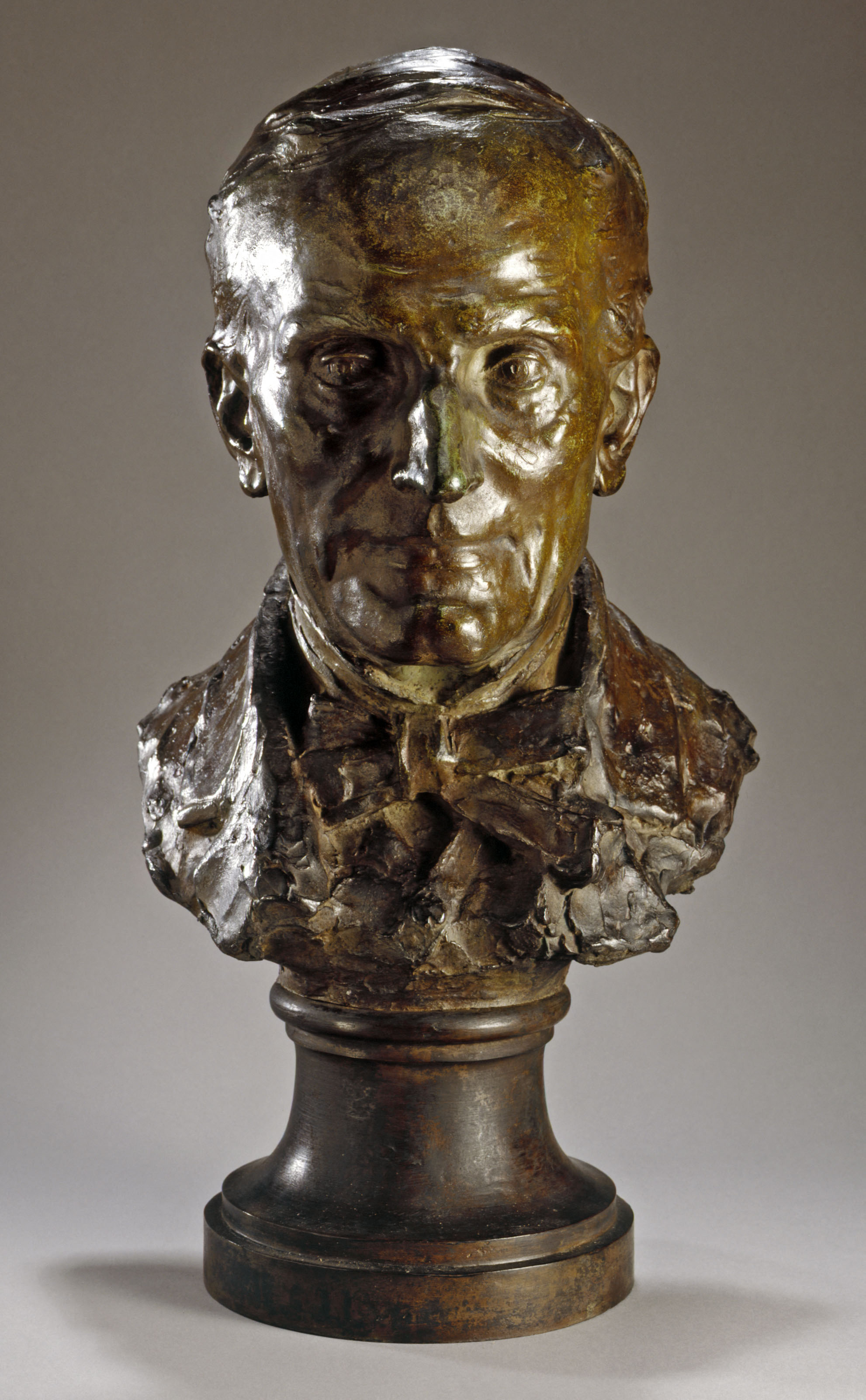
- Buste d'Eugène Dutuit (Fix-Masseau)
- Born: 7 April 1807; Marseille
- Died: 25 June 1886 (aged 79); Rouen

Eugène Dutuit (7 April 1807 – 25 June 1886) was a French politician and art collector who also wrote several works on art history.

Dutuit was born in Marseille as the son of a cotton merchant but grew up in Rouen, where he studied law and lived most of his life. He traveled to the Netherlands in 1826, where he visited museums and began collecting prints, six hundred of which he later donated in 1845 to the library of Rouen. He was elected member of the Academy of Sciences, Literature, and Arts of Rouen in 1846 and became deputy mayor there from 1846 to 1874. In 1852 he and his brother Auguste and sister Heloise inherited their father's fortune.

He moved to Brighton in the Prussian invasion of 1870–71, which allowed him to make art contacts in England, especially in the Burlington Fine Arts Club of London. He signed in 1877 with the publisher A. Levy for publishing his L'Amateur Manual D'Estampes, a dictionary of prints, and also for a catalogue raisonné of Rembrandt. Though both brothers worked on the collection, it was Auguste who actually wrote the works that were published. At the end of his life, Eugène wanted to turn the local Hotel de Bourgtheroulde in Rouen into a museum housing the collection, but this was not finalized before his death. There is today a street that bears his name.

After the death of his brother Auguste Jean-Baptiste in 1902, who had been living in Rome, their collection of works of art was surprisingly bequeathed to the City of Paris rather than Rouen. Their collection formed the backbone of the young Petit Palais. A condition of the bequest is the perpetual care of the grave of Duclos-Dutuit family in Père Lachaise cemetery. Auguste's name lives on today in his attribution of Persian vases to the Dutuit Painter.

== Bibliography ==
- The brothers Dutuit in the Institut national d'histoire de l'art (INHA)
