= Rembrandt =

Dutch painter and printmaker (1606–1669)

- Self-Portrait with Beret and Turned-Up Collar (1659)
- Born: Rembrandt Harmenszoon van Rijn; 15 July 1606; Leiden, Dutch Republic
- Died: 4 October 1669 (aged 63); Amsterdam, Dutch Republic
- Education: Jacob van Swanenburg; Pieter Lastman
- Known for: Painting, printmaking, drawing
- Notable work: Self-portraits; The Anatomy Lesson of Dr. Nicolaes Tulp (1632); The Storm on the Sea of Galilee (1633); Belshazzar's Feast (1635–1638); The Night Watch (1642); The Hundred Guilder Print (etching, c. 1647–1649); Bathsheba at Her Bath (1654); Syndics of the Drapers' Guild (1662); The Return of the Prodigal Son (1661–1669)
- Movement: Dutch Golden Age; Baroque
- Spouse: Saskia van Uylenburgh (m. 1634; died 1642)
- Children: 2, including Titus

Rembrandt Harmenszoon van Rijn (Note: /ˈrɛmbrænt, ˈrɛmbrɑːnt/; Dutch: [ˈrɛmbrɑnt ˈɦɑrmə(n)ˌsoːɱ vɑn ˈrɛin]) (Note: In this Dutch name, the surname is van Rijn, not Rijn.) (15 July 1606 – 4 October 1669), known mononymously as Rembrandt, was a Dutch Golden Age painter, printmaker, and draughtsman. He is generally considered one of the greatest visual artists in the history of Western art. It is estimated that Rembrandt's surviving works amount to about three hundred paintings, three hundred etchings, and several hundred drawings.

Unlike most Dutch painters of the 17th century, Rembrandt's works depict a wide range of styles and subject matter, from portraits and self-portraits to landscapes, genre scenes, allegorical and historical scenes, biblical and mythological subjects and animal studies. His contributions to art came in a period that historians call the Dutch Golden Age.

Rembrandt never went abroad, but was considerably influenced by the work of the Italian Old Masters and Dutch and Flemish artists who had studied in Italy. After he achieved youthful success as a portrait painter, Rembrandt's later years were marked by personal tragedy and financial hardships. Still, his etchings and paintings were popular throughout his lifetime; his reputation as an artist remained high, and for twenty years he taught many important Dutch painters. Rembrandt's portraits of his contemporaries, self-portraits and illustrations of scenes from the Bible are regarded as his greatest creative triumphs. His approximately 100 self-portraits, over 40 of which are paintings, form an intimate autobiography.

== Early life and education ==
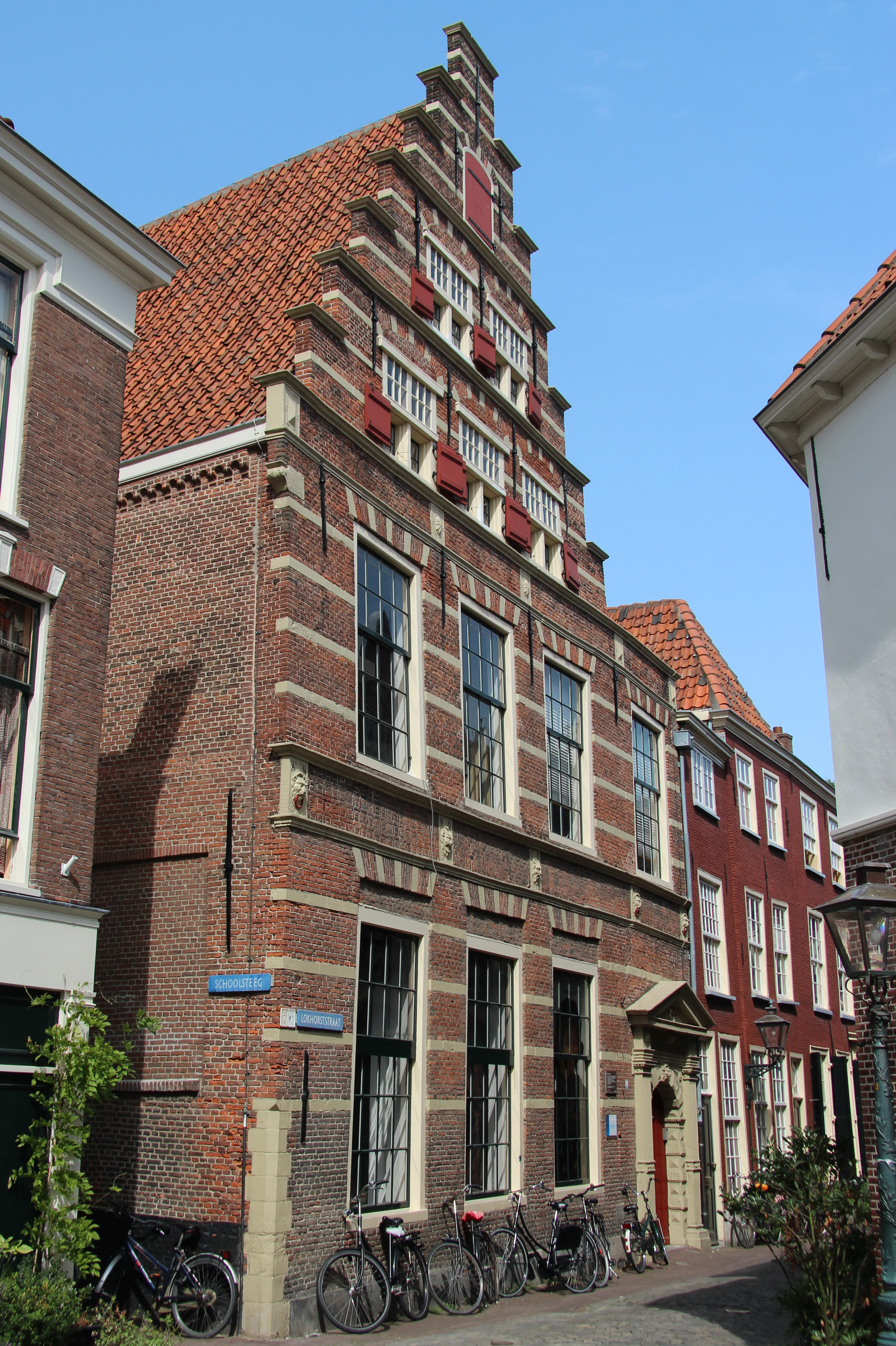
Latin school at Lokhorststraat 16, Leiden

Rembrandt (Note: This version of his first name, "Rembrandt" with a "d," first appeared in his signatures in 1633. Until then, he had signed with a combination of initials or monograms. In late 1632, he began signing solely with his first name, "Rembrant". He added the "d" in the following year and stuck to this spelling for the rest of his life. Although scholars can only speculate, this change must have had a meaning for Rembrandt, which is generally interpreted as his wanting to be known by his first name like the great figures of the Italian Renaissance: Leonardo, Raphael etc., who did not sign with their last names, if at all.) Harmenszoon (abbr. Harmensz.) van Rijn was born on 15 July 1606 in Leiden, in the Dutch Republic, now the Netherlands. He was the ninth child born to Harmen Gerritszoon van Rijn and Neeltgen Willemsdochter van Zuijtbrouck. His family was quite well-to-do; his father was a miller and his mother was a baker's daughter. His mother was Catholic, and his father belonged to the Dutch Reformed Church. Religion is a central theme in Rembrandt's works and the religiously fraught period in which he lived makes his faith a matter of interest.

As a boy, he attended a Latin school. In 1620, he was enrolled at Leiden University, although he had a greater inclination towards painting and was soon apprenticed to Jacob van Swanenburg, with whom he spent three years. After a brief but important apprenticeship of six months with the history painter Pieter Lastman in Amsterdam, Rembrandt stayed a few months with Jacob Pynas in 1625, though Simon van Leeuwen claimed that Rembrandt was taught by Joris van Schooten and then started his own workshop.

== Career ==
In 1625, Rembrandt opened a studio in Leiden, which he shared with friend and colleague Jan Lievens. In 1627, Rembrandt began to accept students, among them Gerrit Dou and Isaac de Jouderville. Joan Huydecoper is mentioned as the first buyer of a Rembrandt painting in 1628. In 1629, Rembrandt was discovered by the statesman Constantijn Huygens who procured for Rembrandt important commissions from the court of The Hague. As a result of this connection, Prince Frederik Hendrik continued to purchase paintings from Rembrandt.

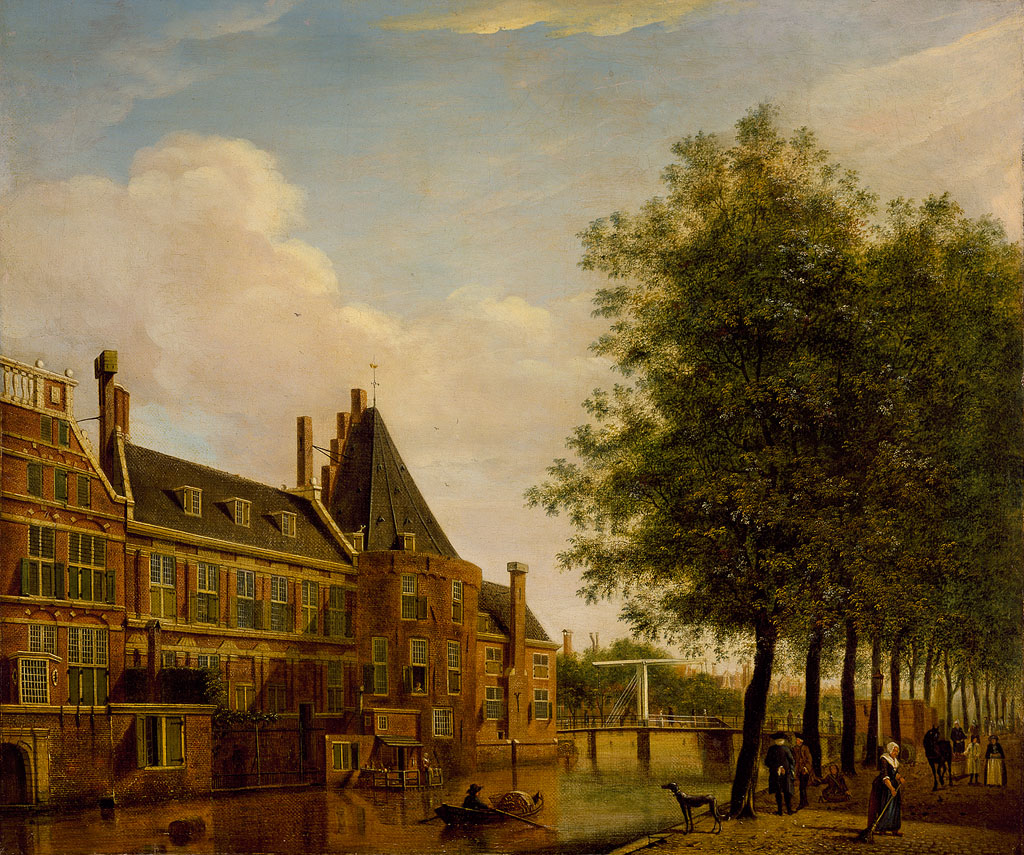
Rembrandt lived at the Amstel river almost next to Kloveniersdoelen where The Night Watch was exhibited for years; painting by Jan Ekels the Elder (1775)

At the end of 1631, Rembrandt moved to Amsterdam, a city rapidly expanding as the business and trade capital. He began to practice as a professional portraitist for the first time, with great success. He initially stayed with an art dealer, Hendrick van Uylenburgh, and in 1634, married Hendrick's cousin, Saskia van Uylenburgh. Saskia came from a respected family: her father Rombertus was a lawyer and had been burgomaster (mayor) of Leeuwarden. The couple married in the local church of St. Annaparochie without the presence of Rembrandt's relatives. In the same year, Rembrandt became a citizen of Amsterdam and a member of the local guild of painters. He also acquired a number of students, among them Ferdinand Bol and Govert Flinck.

In 1635, Rembrandt and Saskia rented a fashionable lodging with a view of the river Amstel. In 1637, Rembrandt moved upriver to Vlooienburg, in a building on the previous site of the current Stopera. In May 1639 they moved to a recently modernised house in the upscale 'Breestraat' with artists and art dealers; Nicolaes Pickenoy, a portrait painter, was his neighbour. The mortgage to finance the 13,000 guilder purchase would be a cause for later financial difficulties. (Note: Rembrandt promised the owner—a woman with mental problems—to pay a quarter of the purchase price within a year; the rest within five to six years. For some reason the purchase was not registered at the town hall and had to be renewed in 1653.) The neighborhood sheltered many immigrants and was becoming the Jewish quarter. It was there that Rembrandt frequently sought his Jewish neighbours to model for his Hebrew Bible scenes. One of the great patrons at the early stages of his career was Amsterdam statesman Andries de Graeff.

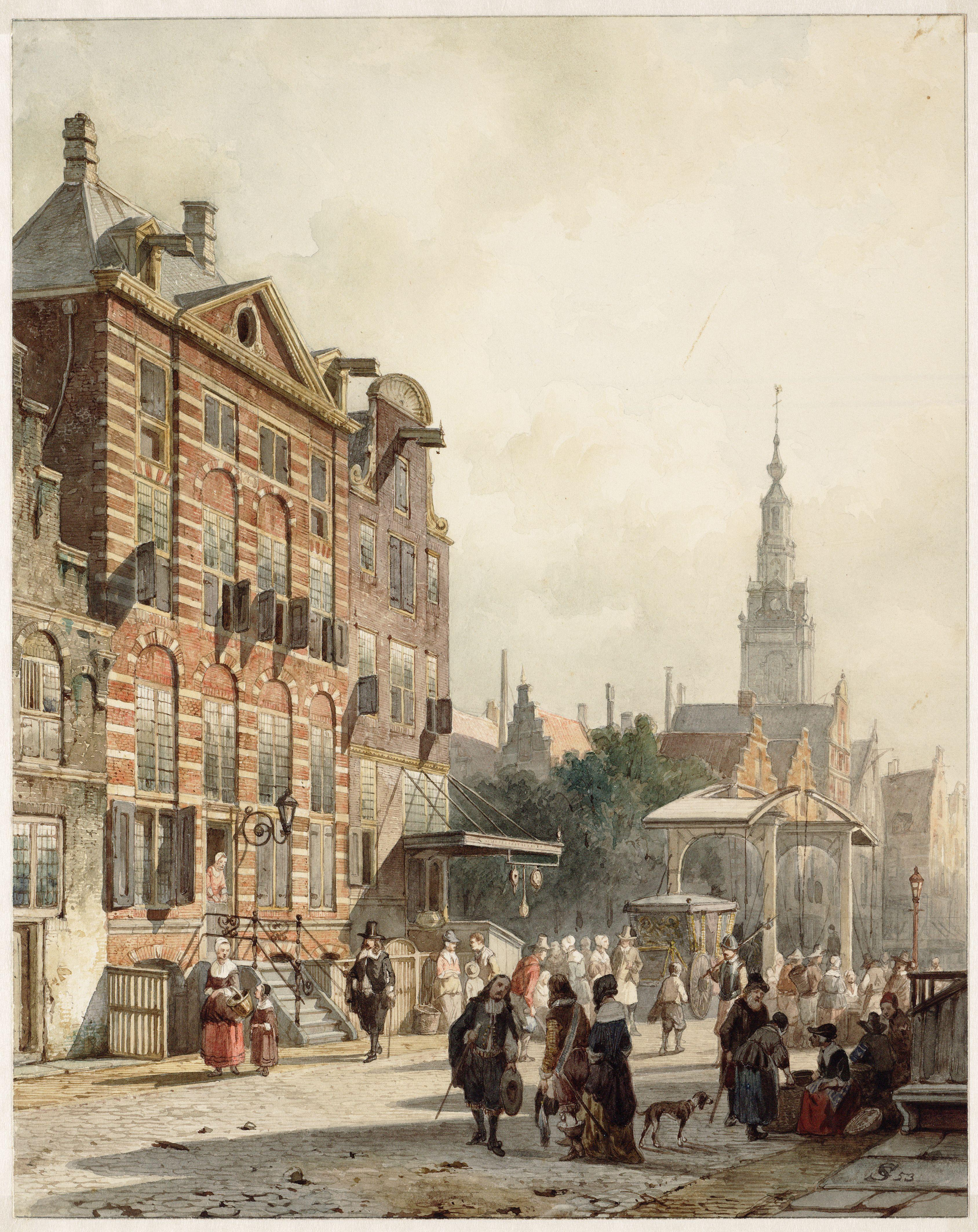
Rembrandt's house at Jodenbreestraat by Cornelis Springer (1853); in the background the Zuiderkerk where his children were buried

Although they were by now affluent, the couple suffered several personal setbacks; three children died within weeks of their births. (Note: Their son Rombartus died two months after his birth and their daughter Cornelia died at just three weeks of age. A second daughter, also named Cornelia, died after living barely over a month.) (Note: His children were christened in Dutch Reformed churches in Amsterdam: four in the Oude Kerk, and Titus in the Zuiderkerk.) Only their fourth child, Titus, who was born in 1641, survived into adulthood. Saskia died in 1642, probably from tuberculosis. Rembrandt's drawings of her on her sick and death bed are among his most moving works. After Saskia's illness, the widow Geertje Dircx was hired as Titus's caretaker and dry nurse; at some time, she also became Rembrandt's lover. In May 1649 she left and charged Rembrandt with breach of promise and asked to be awarded alimony. Rembrandt tried to settle the matter amicably, but to pay her lawyer she pawned the diamond ring he had given her that once belonged to Saskia. On 14 October they came to an agreement; the court particularly stated that Rembrandt had to pay a yearly maintenance allowance, provided that Titus remained her only heir and she sold none of Rembrandt's possessions. As Dircx broke her promise, Rembrandt and members of Dircx's own family had her committed to a women's house of correction at Gouda in August 1650. Rembrandt also took measures to ensure she stayed in the house of correction for as long as possible. Rembrandt paid for the costs. (Note: Five years later he did not support her release without the presence of her brother, a sailor. In August 1656 Geertghe Dircx was listed as one of Rembrandt's seven major creditors.)

In early 1649, Rembrandt began a relationship with the 23-year-old Hendrickje Stoffels, who had initially been his maid. She may have been the cause of Geertje's leaving. In that year he made no (dated) paintings or etchings at all. In 1654 Rembrandt painted a nude Bathsheba at Her Bath. In June Hendrickje received three summonses from the Reformed Church to answer the charge "that she had committed the acts of a whore with Rembrandt the painter". In July she admitted her guilt and was banned from receiving communion. Rembrandt was not summoned to appear for the Church council. In October they had a daughter, Cornelia. Had he remarried he would have lost access to a trust set up for Titus in Saskia's will.

=== Insolvency ===
Rembrandt, despite his artistic success, found himself in financial turmoil. His penchant for acquiring art, prints, and rare items led him to live beyond his means. In January 1653 the sale of the property formally was finalised but Rembrandt still had to cover half of the remaining mortgage. Creditors began pressing for instalments but Rembrandt, facing financial strain, sought a postponement. The house required repairs, prompting Rembrandt to borrow money from friends, among them Jan Six. (Note: Quite a few people were in debt after the First Anglo-Dutch War. The Dutch were driven from Brazil too; the 'Brazilian Adventure' cost the Dutch merchant community dearly.)

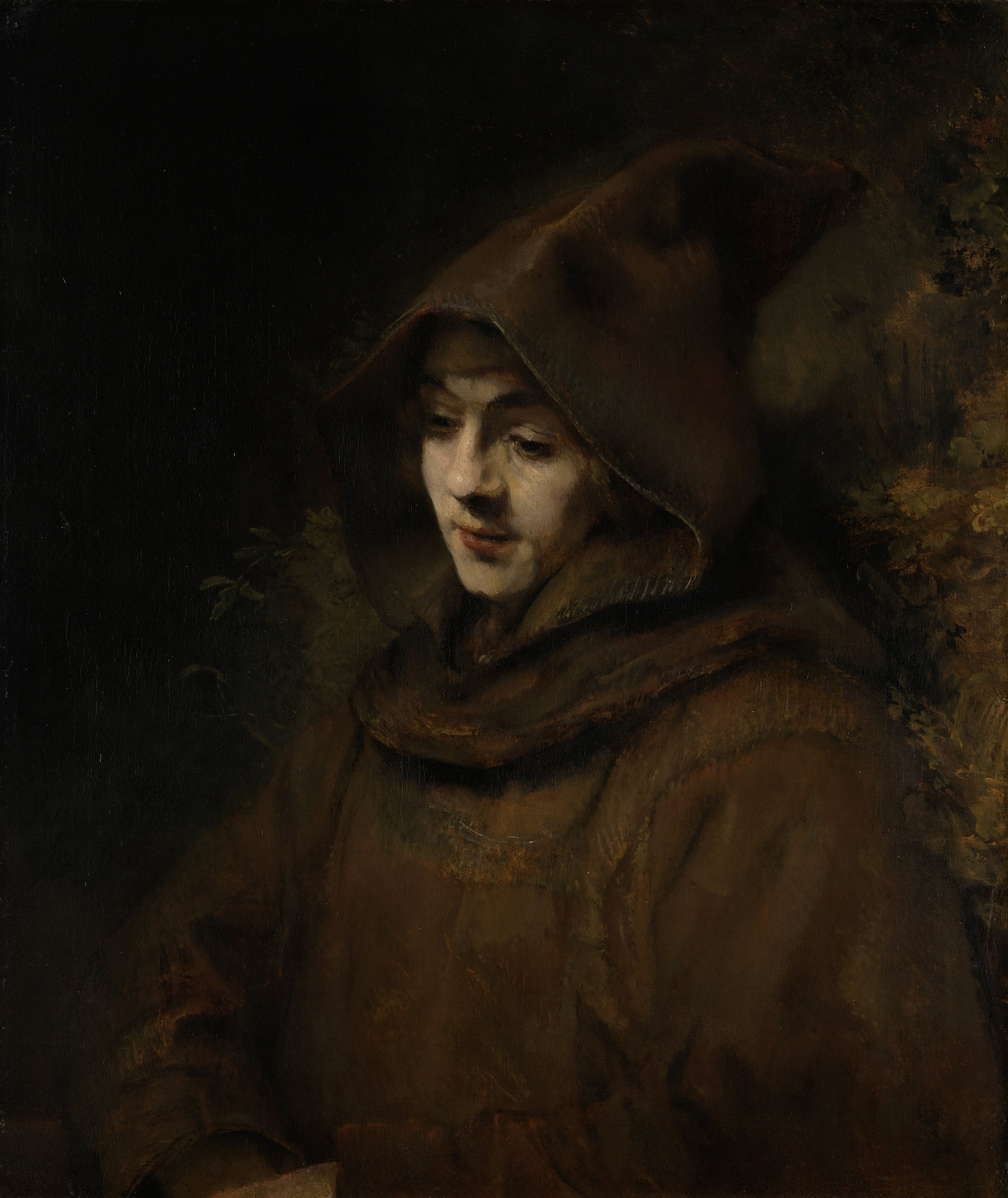
Rembrandt's son Titus painted as a Franciscan monk (1660)

In November 1655, amid a year overshadowed by plague and the drafting of wills, Rembrandt's 14-year-old son Titus took a significant step by drafting a will that designated his father as the sole heir, effectively sidelining his mother's family. In December Rembrandt orchestrated a sale of his paintings, yet the earnings failed to meet expectations. This tumultuous period deeply impacted the art industry, prompting Rembrandt to seek a high court arrangement known as cessio bonorum. Despite his financial difficulties, Rembrandt's bankruptcy was not forced. In July 1656, he declared his insolvency, taking stock and willingly surrendered his assets. Notably, he had already transferred the house to his son. Both the authorities and his creditors showed leniency, granting him ample time to settle his debts. Jacob J. Hinlopen allegedly played a role.

In November 1657 another auction was held to sell his paintings, as well as a substantial number of etching plates and drawings, some of the latter by famous artists, including Raphael, Mantegna and Giorgione. (Note: Jan van de Capelle bought 500 of the drawings/prints by Lucas van Leyden, Hercules Seghers and Goltzius among others.) Remarkably, Rembrandt was permitted to retain his tools as a means of generating income. Rembrandt lost the guardianship of his son and thus control over his actions. A new guardian, Louis Crayers, claimed the house in settlement of Titus's debt.

The sale list comprising 363 items offers insight into Rembrandt's diverse collections, which encompassed Old Master paintings, drawings, busts of Roman emperors, statues of Greek philosophers, books (including a bible), two globes, bonnets, armour, and various objects from Asia (porcelain), as well as a collections of natural history specimens (two lion skins, a bird-of-paradise, corals and minerals). However, the sale prices were disappointing.

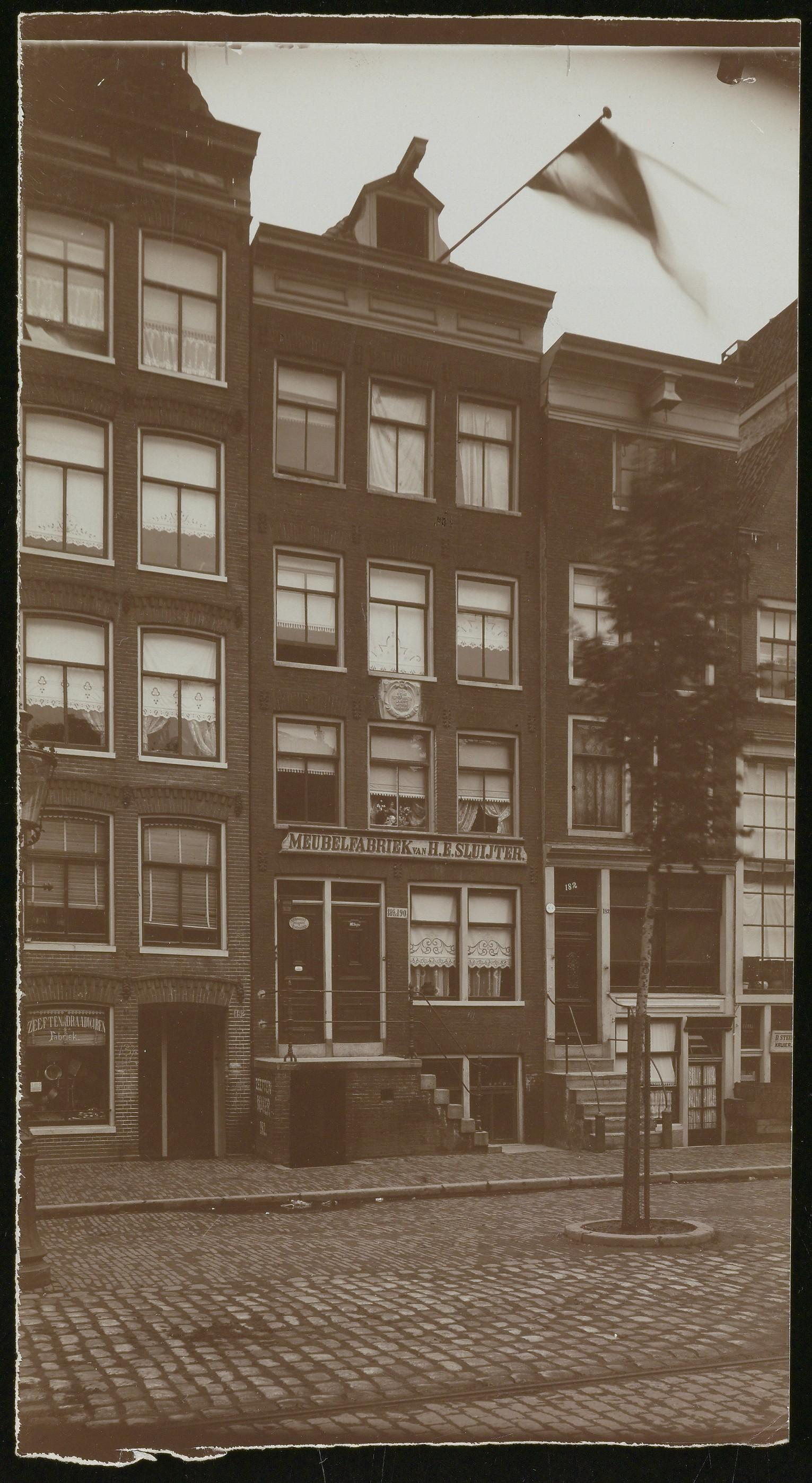
Rembrandt moved to Rozengracht 184, Stadsarchief Amsterdam

By February 1658, Rembrandt' house had been sold at a foreclosure auction, and the family moved to more modest lodgings at Rozengracht. In 1660, he finished Ahasuerus and Haman at the feast of Esther, which he sold to Jan J. Hinlopen. In early December 1660, the sale of the house was finalised but the proceeds went directly to Titus's guardian.

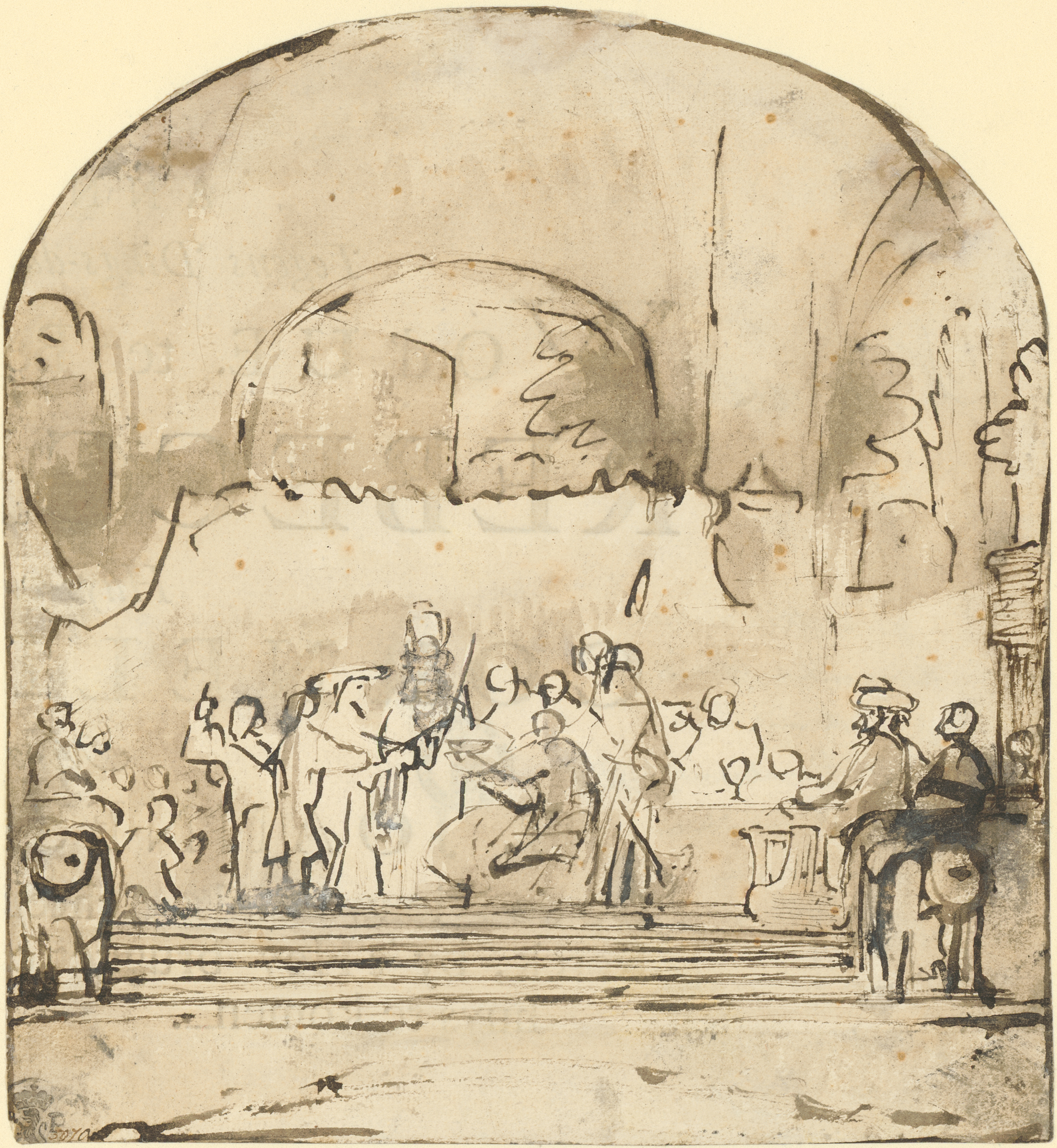
Sketch for The Conspiracy of Claudius Civilis (October 1661 or later)

Two weeks later, Hendrickje and Titus established a dummy corporation as art dealers, allowing Rembrandt, who had board and lodging, to continue his artistic pursuits. In 1661, they secured a contract for a major project at the newly completed town hall. The resulting work, The Conspiracy of Claudius Civilis, was rejected by the mayors and returned to the painter within a few weeks; the surviving fragment (in Stockholm) is only a quarter of the original.

Despite these setbacks, Rembrandt continued to receive significant portrait commissions and completed notable works, such as the Sampling Officials in 1662. It remains a challenge to gauge Rembrandt's wealth accurately as he may have overestimated the value of his art collection. Nonetheless, half of his assets were earmarked for Titus's inheritance.

In March 1663, with Hendrickje's illness, Titus assumed a more prominent role. Isaac van Hertsbeeck, Rembrandt's primary creditor, went to the High Court and contested Titus's priority for payment, leading to legal battles that Titus ultimately won in 1665 when he came of age. During this time, Rembrandt worked on notable pieces like The Jewish Bride and his final self-portraits, but struggled with rent arrears. Notably, Cosimo III de' Medici, Grand Duke of Tuscany, visited Rembrandt twice, and returned to Florence with one of the self-portraits.

Rembrandt outlived both Hendrickje and Titus; he died on Friday, 4 October 1669, and was buried four days later in a rented grave in the Westerkerk. His illegitimate child, Cornelia (1654–1684), eventually moved to Batavia in 1670, accompanied by an obscure painter and her mother's inheritance. Titus's considerable inheritance passed to his only child, Titia (1669-1715) who married her cousin and lived at Blauwburgwal. Rembrandt's life was marked by more than just artistic achievements; he navigated numerous legal and financial challenges, leaving a complex legacy.

== Works ==
=== Overview ===
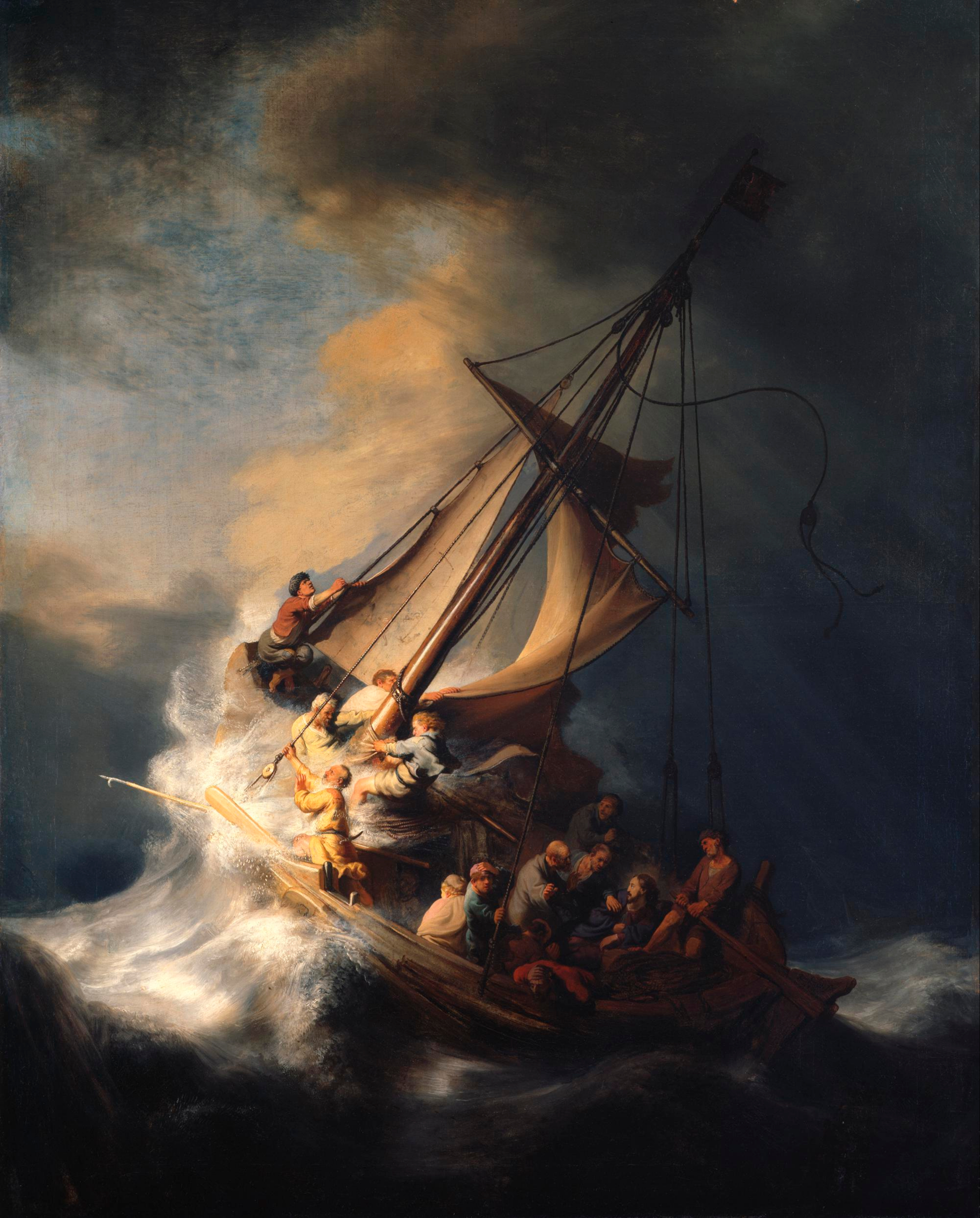
Rembrandt's only known seascape, The Storm on the Sea of Galilee (1633), is still missing after the robbery from the Isabella Stewart Gardner Museum in 1990.

In a letter to Huygens, Rembrandt offered the only surviving explanation of what he sought to achieve through his art, writing that, "the greatest and most natural movement", translated from de meeste en de natuurlijkste beweegelijkheid. The word "beweegelijkheid" translates to "emotion" or "motive". Whether this refers to objectives, material, or something else, is not known but critics have drawn particular attention to the way Rembrandt seamlessly melded the earthly and spiritual.

As connoisseurship developed in the 19th and 20th centuries, Rembrandt's oeuvre increased in size. By the early 20th century, connoisseurs thought Rembrandt had produced well over 600 paintings, nearly 400 etchings and 2,000 drawings. More recent scholarship, from the 1960s to the present day (led by the Rembrandt Research Project), often controversially, has winnowed his oeuvre to nearer 300 paintings. (Note: Useful totals of the figures from various different oeuvre catalogues, often divided into classes along the lines of: "very likely authentic", "possibly authentic" and "unlikely to be authentic" are given at the Online Rembrandt catalogue) His prints, traditionally all called etchings, although many are produced in whole or part by engraving and sometimes drypoint, have a much more stable total of slightly under 300. (Note: Two hundred years ago Bartsch listed 375. More recent catalogues have added three (two in unique impressions) and excluded enough to reach totals as follows: Schwartz, pp. 6, 289; Münz 1952, 279; Boon 1963, 287 Print Council of America – but Schwartz's total quoted does not tally with the book.) It is likely Rembrandt made many more drawings in his lifetime than 2,000 but those extant are rarer than presumed. (Note: It is not possible to give a total, as a new wave of scholarship on Rembrandt drawings is still in progress – analysis of the Berlin collection for an exhibition in 2006/7 has produced a probable drop from 130 sheets there to about 60. Codart.nl The British Museum is due to publish a new catalogue after a similar exercise.) Two experts claim that the number of drawings whose autograph status can be regarded as effectively "certain" is no higher than about 75, although this is disputed. The list was to be unveiled at a scholarly meeting in February 2010.

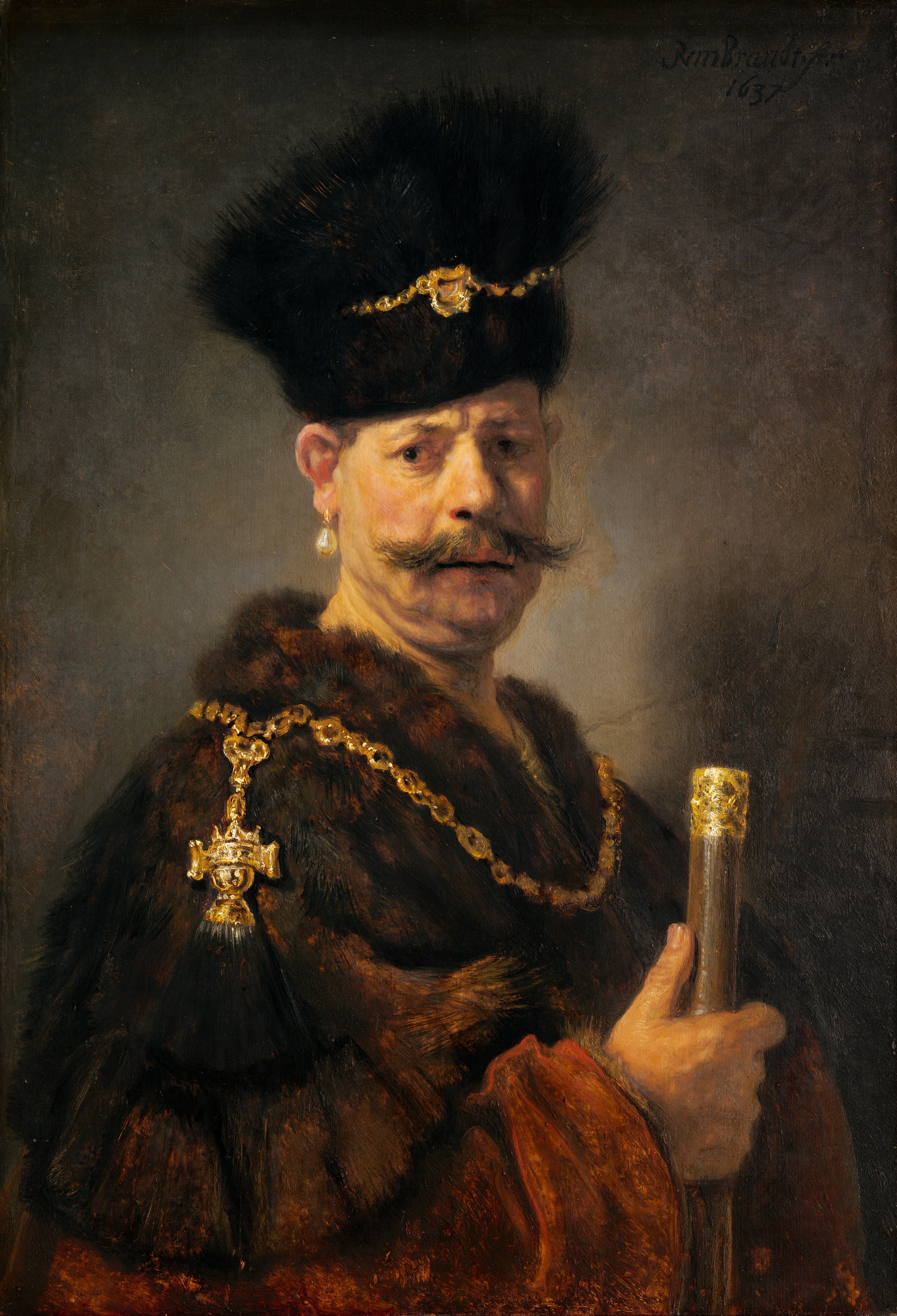
A Polish Nobleman (1637)

At one time, approximately 90 paintings were counted as Rembrandt self-portraits but it is now known that he had his students copy his own self-portraits as part of their training. Modern scholarship has reduced the autograph count to over forty paintings, as well as a few drawings and thirty-one etchings, which include many of the "most remarkable" images of the group. Some show him posing in quasi-historical fancy dress, or pulling faces at himself. His oil paintings trace the progress from an uncertain young man, through the dapper and very successful portrait-painter of the 1630s, to the troubled but massively powerful portraits of his old age. Together they are believed to give a remarkably clear picture of the man, his appearance and his psychological make-up, as revealed by his richly weathered face. (Note: While the popular interpretation is that these paintings represent a personal and introspective journey, it is possible that they were painted to satisfy a market for self-portraits by prominent artists. Van de Wetering, p. 290.)

In his portraits and self-portraits, he angles the sitter's face in such a way that the ridge of the nose nearly always forms the line of demarcation between brightly illuminated and shadowy areas. A Rembrandt face is a face partially eclipsed; and the nose, bright and obvious, thrusting into the riddle of halftones, serves to focus the viewer's attention upon, and to dramatise, the division between a flood of light—an overwhelming clarity—and a brooding duskiness.

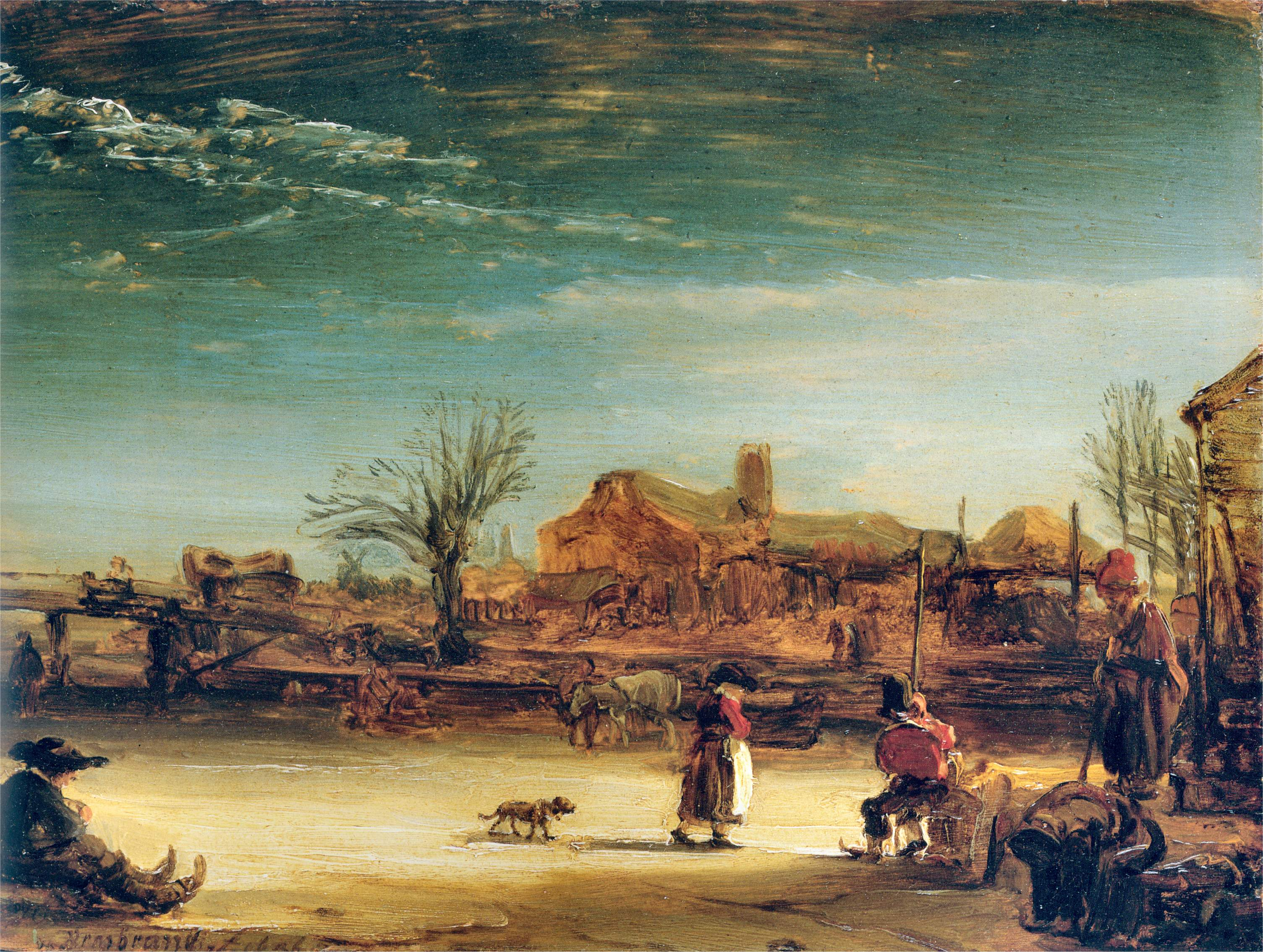
Winter Landscape (1646), his only composition in this genre

In some of his biblical works, including The Raising of the Cross, Joseph Telling His Dreams, and The Stoning of Saint Stephen, Rembrandt painted himself as a character in the crowd. Durham suggests that this was because the Bible was for Rembrandt "a kind of diary, an account of moments in his own life".

Among the more prominent characteristics of Rembrandt's work are his use of chiaroscuro, the theatrical employment of light and shadow derived from Caravaggio, or, more likely, from the Dutch Caravaggisti but adapted for very personal means. Also notable are his dramatic and lively presentation of subjects, devoid of the rigid formality that his contemporaries often displayed, and a deeply felt compassion for mankind, irrespective of wealth and age. His immediate family—his wife Saskia, his son Titus and his common-law wife Hendrickje—often figured prominently in his paintings, many of which had mythical, biblical or historical subjects.

=== Periods, subjects and styles ===
The Abduction of Europa (1632) has been described as "...a shining example of the 'golden age' of Baroque painting".

Throughout his career, Rembrandt took as his most common subjects portraits, narrative or "history paintings", mostly biblical, and landscapes. He was especially praised by his contemporaries for his biblical subjects, for his skill in representing emotions, and attention to detail. Stylistically, his paintings progressed from the early "smooth" manner, characterised by fine technique in the portrayal of illusionistic form, to the late "rough" treatment of richly variegated paint surfaces, which allowed for an illusionism of form suggested by the tactile quality of the paint itself. Rembrandt must have realised that if he kept the paint deliberately loose and "paint-like" on some parts of the canvas, the perception of space became much greater.

A parallel development may be seen in Rembrandt's skill as a printmaker. In the etchings of his maturity, particularly from the late 1640s onward, the freedom and breadth of his drawings and paintings found expression in the print medium as well. The works encompass a wide range of subject matter and technique, sometimes leaving large areas of white paper to suggest space, at other times employing complex webs of line to produce rich dark tones.

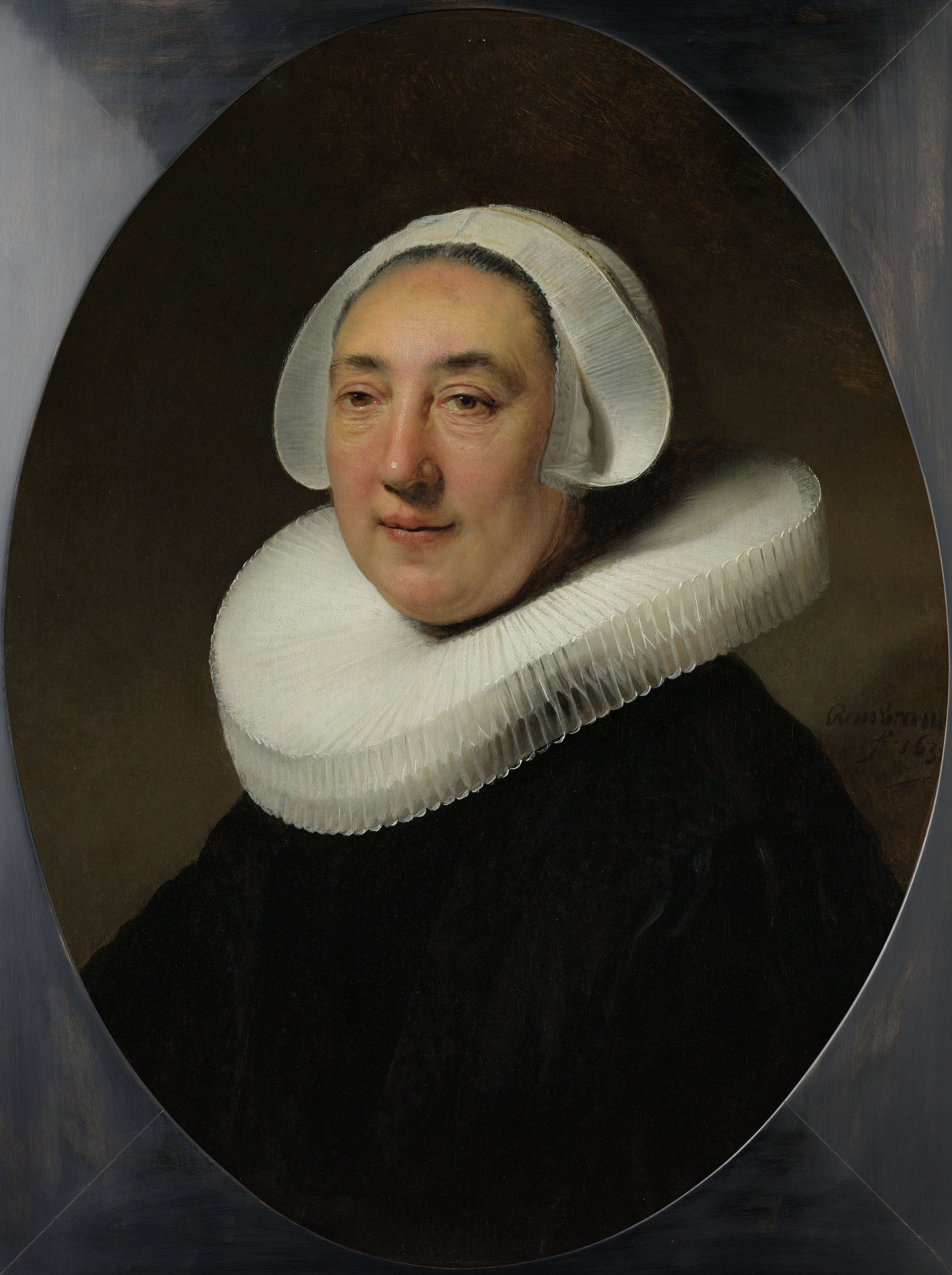
Portrait of Haesje Jacobsdr. van Cleyburg from Rotterdam (1634) completed during the height of his commercial success

Lastman's influence on Rembrandt was most prominent during his period in Leiden from 1625 to 1631. Paintings were rather small but rich in details (for example, in costumes and jewelry). Religious and allegorical subjects were favoured, as were tronies. In 1626 Rembrandt produced his first etchings, the wide dissemination of which would largely account for his international fame. In 1629, he completed Judas Repentant, Returning the Pieces of Silver and The Artist in His Studio, works that evidence his interest in the handling of light and variety of paint application and constitute the first major progress in his development as a painter.

During his early years in Amsterdam (1632–1636), Rembrandt began to paint dramatic biblical and mythological scenes in high contrast and of large format (The Blinding of Samson, 1636, Belshazzar's Feast, c. 1635 Danaë, 1636 but reworked later), seeking to emulate the baroque style of Rubens. With the occasional help of assistants in Uylenburgh's workshop, he painted numerous portrait commissions both small (Jacob de Gheyn III) and large (Portrait of the Shipbuilder Jan Rijcksen and his Wife, 1633, Anatomy Lesson of Dr. Nicolaes Tulp, 1632).

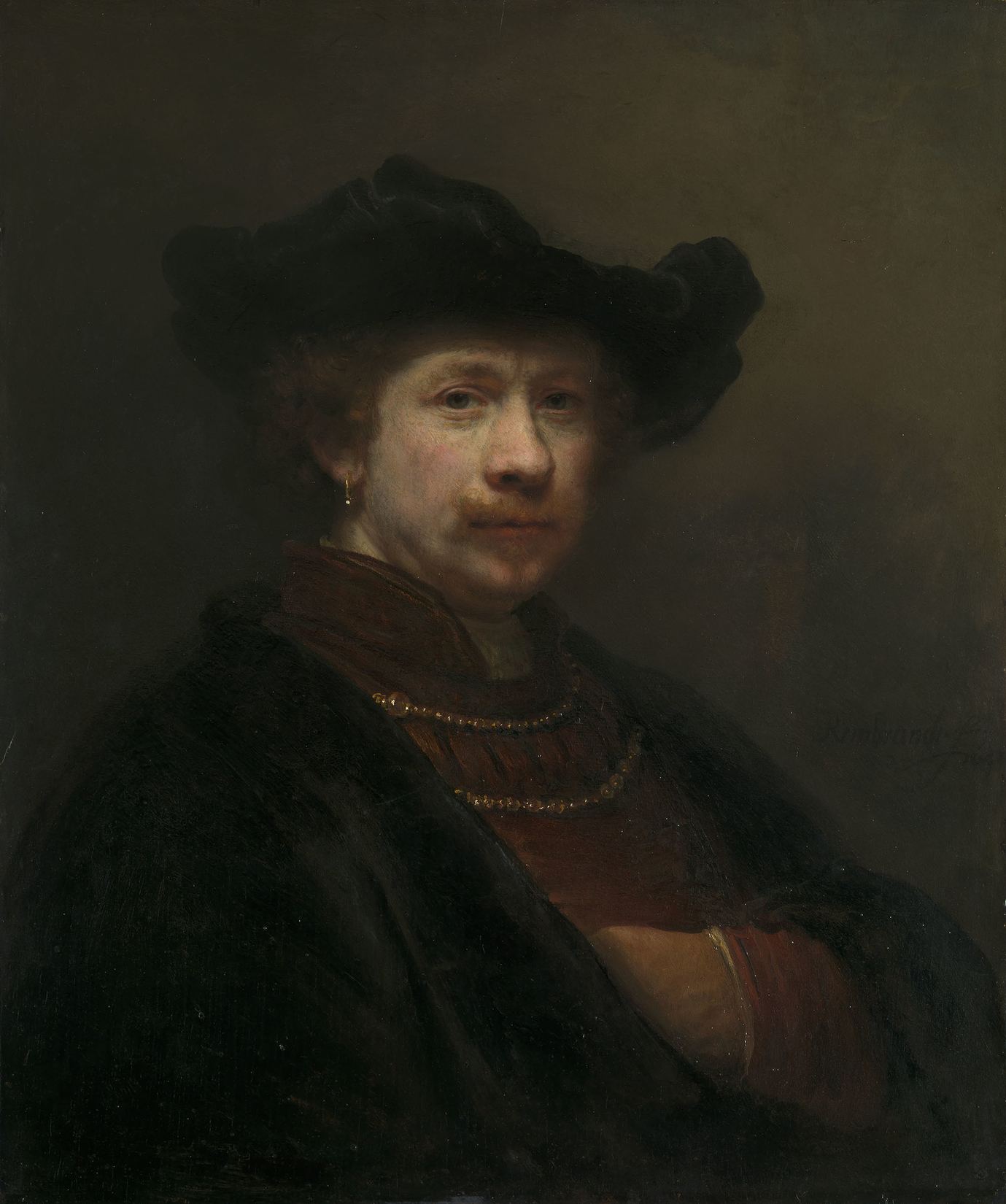
Self-Portrait with a flat cap (1642) Royal Collection

By the late 1630s, Rembrandt had produced a few paintings and many etchings of landscapes. Often these landscapes highlighted natural drama, featuring uprooted trees and ominous skies (Cottages before a Stormy Sky, c. 1641; The Three Trees, 1643). From 1640 his work became less exuberant and more sober in tone, possibly reflecting personal tragedy. Biblical scenes were now derived more often from Christianity’s New Testament than Judaism’s Hebrew Bible, as had been the case before. In 1642 he painted The Night Watch, the most substantial of the important group portrait commissions which he received in this period, and through which he sought to find solutions to compositional and narrative problems that had been attempted in previous works.

In the decade following The Night Watch, Rembrandt's paintings varied greatly in size, subject, and style. The previous tendency to create dramatic effects primarily by strong contrasts of light and shadow gave way to the use of frontal lighting and larger and more saturated areas of colour. Simultaneously, figures came to be placed parallel to the picture plane. These changes can be seen as a move toward a classical mode of composition and, considering the more expressive use of brushwork as well, may indicate a familiarity with Venetian art (Susanna and the Elders, 1637–47). At the same time, there was a marked decrease in painted works in favour of etchings and drawings of landscapes.

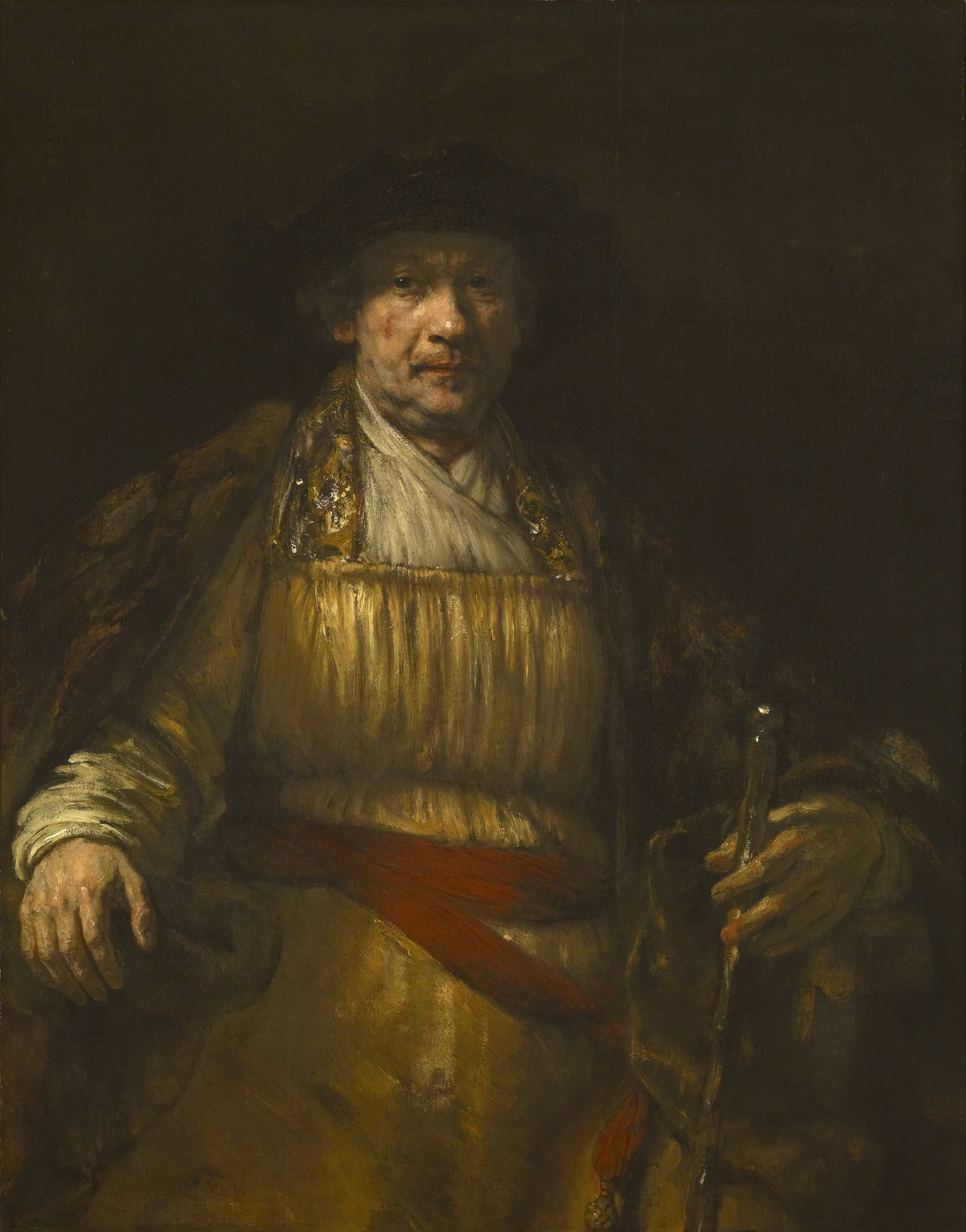
Self Portrait (1658), now Frick Collection, New York, has been described as "the calmest and grandest of all his portraits".

In the 1650s, Rembrandt's style changed again. Colours became richer and brush strokes more pronounced. With these changes, Rembrandt distanced himself from earlier work and current fashion, which increasingly inclined toward fine, detailed works. His use of light becomes more jagged and harsh, and shine becomes almost nonexistent. His singular approach to paint application may have been suggested in part by familiarity with the work of Titian, and could be seen in the context of the then current discussion of 'finish' and surface quality of paintings. Contemporary accounts sometimes remark disapprovingly of the coarseness of Rembrandt's brushwork, and the artist himself was said to have dissuaded visitors from looking too closely at his paintings. The tactile manipulation of paint may hearken to medieval procedures, when mimetic effects of rendering informed a painting's surface. The result is a richly varied handling of paint, deeply layered and often apparently haphazard, which suggests form and space in both an illusory and highly individual manner.

In later years, biblical subjects were often depicted but emphasis shifted from dramatic group scenes to intimate portrait-like figures (James the Apostle, 1661). In his last years, Rembrandt painted his most deeply reflective self-portraits (from 1652 to 1669 he painted fifteen), and several moving images of both men and women (The Jewish Bride, c. 1666)—in love, in life, and before God.

=== Graphic works ===
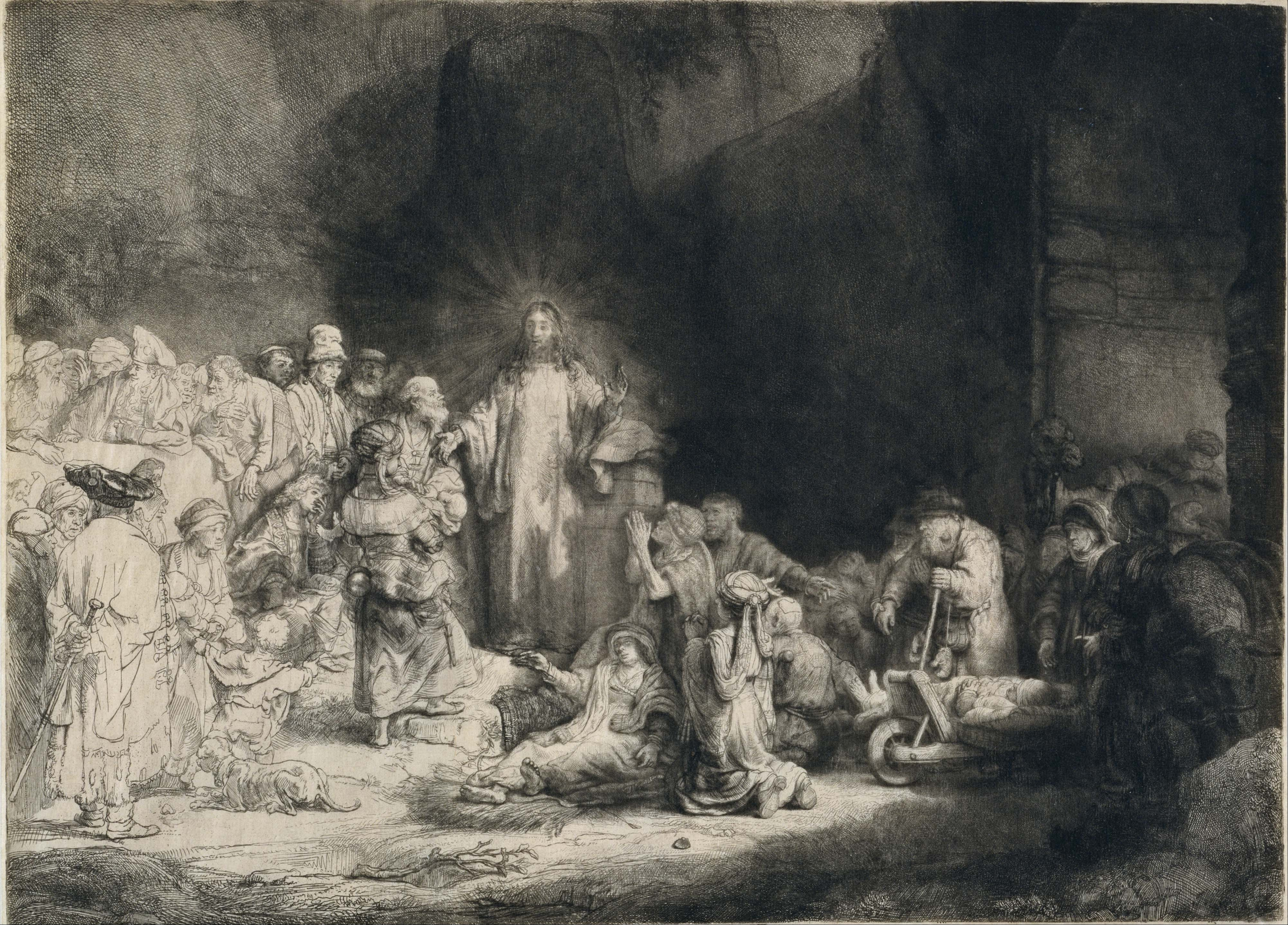
The Hundred Guilder Print (c. 1647–1649)

Rembrandt produced etchings for most of his career, from 1626 to 1660, when he was forced to sell his printing-press and practically abandoned etching. Only the troubled year of 1649 produced no dated work. He took easily to etching and, though he learned to use a burin and partly engraved many plates, the freedom of etching technique was fundamental to his work. He was very closely involved in the whole process of printmaking, and must have printed at least early examples of his etchings himself. At first he used a style based on drawing but soon moved to one based on painting, using a mass of lines and numerous bitings with the acid to achieve different strengths of line. Towards the end of the 1630s, he reacted against this manner and moved to a simpler style, with fewer bitings.

He worked on the so-called Hundred Guilder Print in stages throughout the 1640s, and it was the "critical work in the middle of his career", from which his final etching style began to emerge. Although the print only survives in two states, the first very rare, evidence of much reworking can be seen underneath the final print and many drawings survive for elements of it.

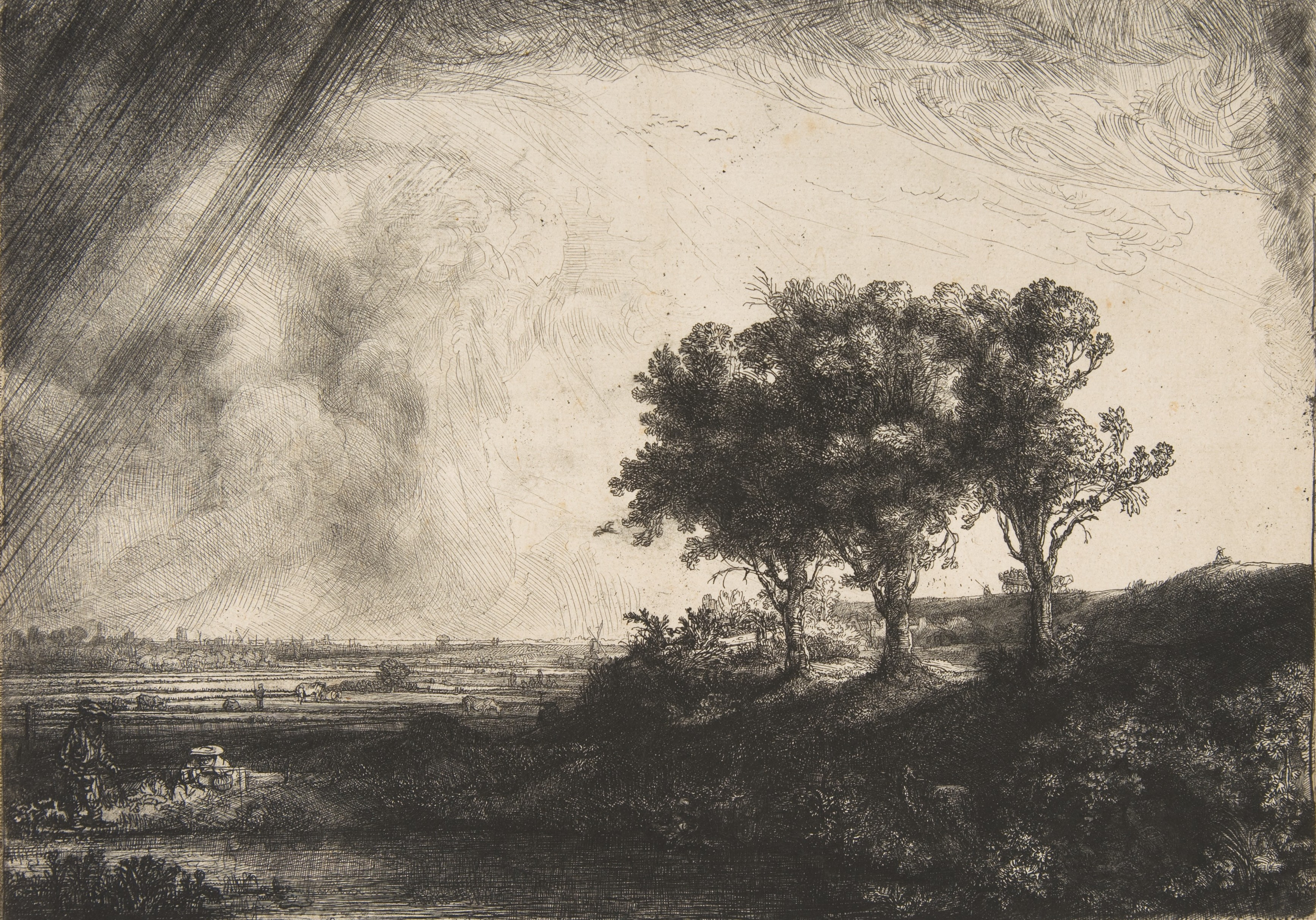
The Three Trees (1643)

In the mature works of the 1650s, Rembrandt was more ready to improvise on the plate and large prints typically survive in several states, up to eleven, often radically changed. He now used hatching to create his dark areas, which often take up much of the plate. He also experimented with the effects of printing on different kinds of paper, including Japanese paper, which he used frequently, and on vellum. He began to use "surface tone", leaving a thin film of ink on parts of the plate instead of wiping it completely clean to print each impression. He made more use of drypoint, exploiting, especially in landscapes, the rich fuzzy burr that this technique gives to the first few impressions.

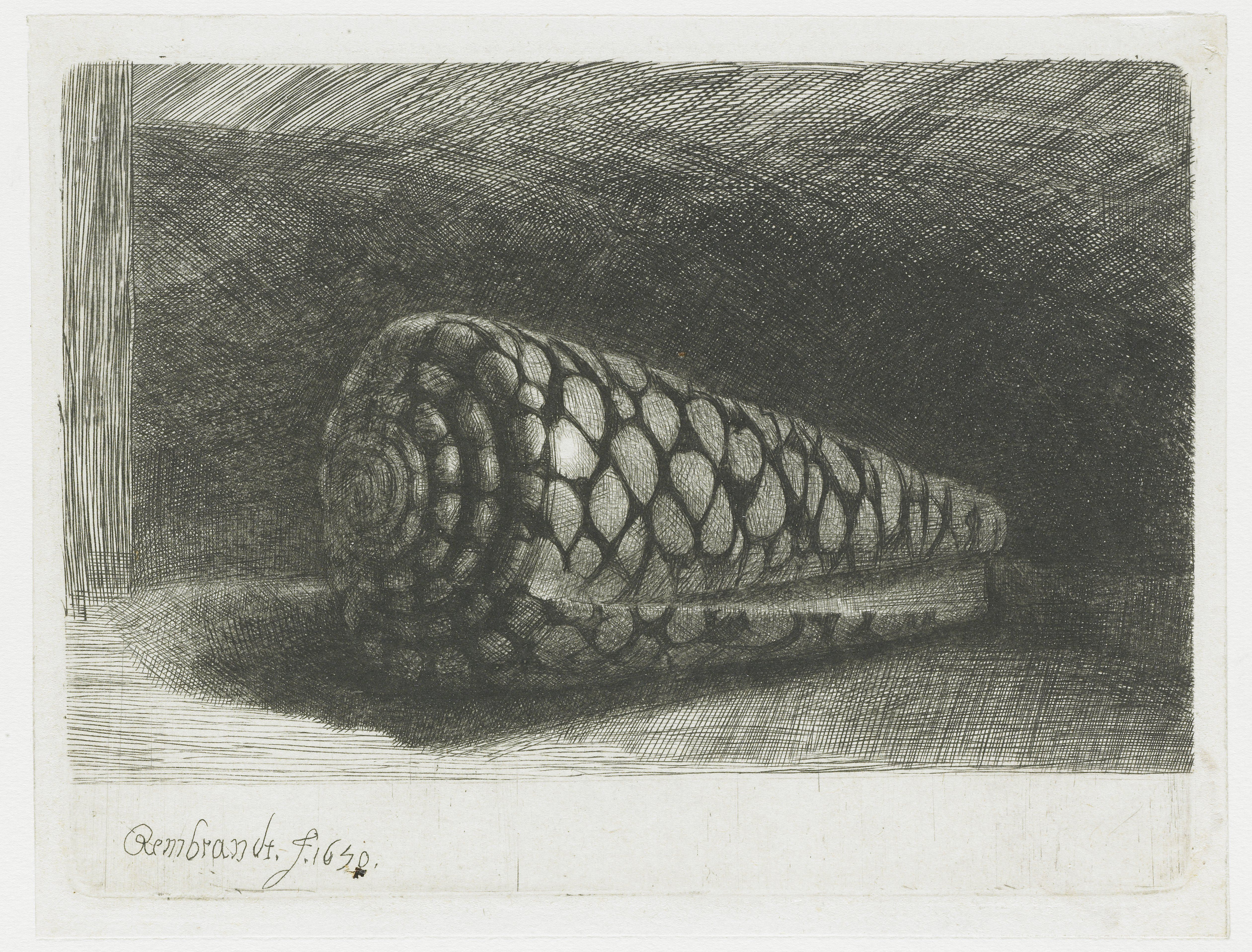
Conus Marmoreus or The Shell is Rembrandt's only still life etching

His prints have similar subjects to his paintings, although the 27 self-portraits are relatively more common, and portraits of other people less so. The landscapes, mostly small, largely set the course for the graphic treatment of landscape until the end of the 19th century. Of the many hundreds of drawings Rembrandt made, only about two hundred have a landscape motif as their subject, and of the approximately three hundred etchings, about thirty show a landscape. As for his painted landscapes, one does not even get beyond eight works. One third of his etchings are of religious subjects, many treated with a homely simplicity, whilst others are his most monumental prints. A few erotic, or just obscene, compositions have no equivalent in his paintings. Rembrandt owned, until forced to sell it, a magnificent collection of works by other artists. He was influenced by artists including Caravaggio with his chiaroscuro lighting. Borrowings and influences in his work can be traced to artists as diverse as Andrea Mantegna (with his Entombment), Anthony van Dyck, Raphael, Titian, Peter Paul Rubens, Hercules Seghers, and Giovanni Benedetto Castiglione.

Drawings by Rembrandt and his pupils have been extensively studied by many artists and scholars (Note: Such as Otto Benesch, David Hockney, Nigel Konstam, Jakob Rosenberg, Gary Schwartz, and Seymour Slive.) through the centuries.

=== Asian inspiration ===
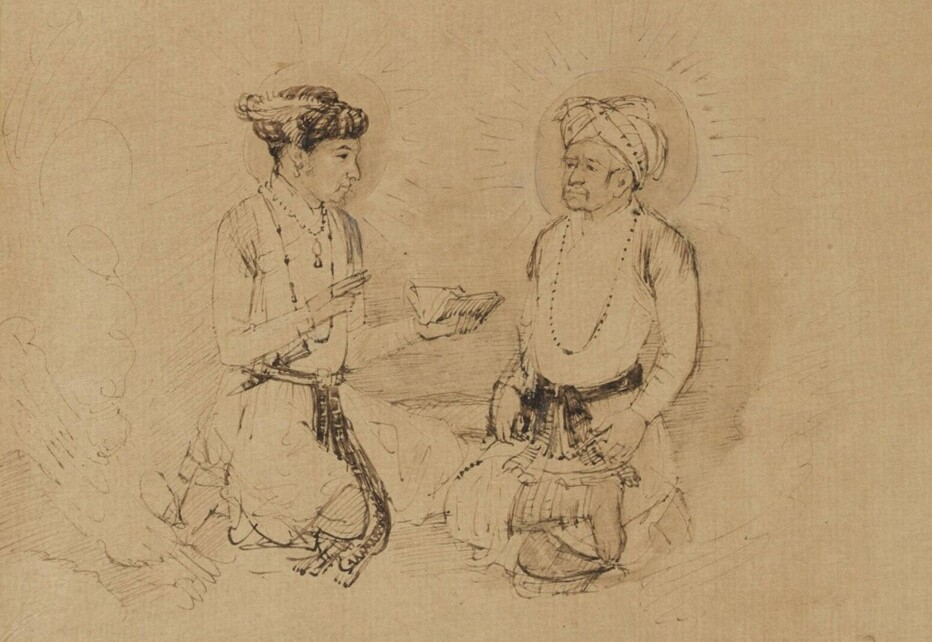
Rembrandt's drawing of an Indian Mughal painting (detail)

Rembrandt was interested in Mughal miniatures, especially around the 1650s. He drew versions of some 23 Mughal paintings and may have owned an album of them. These miniatures include paintings of Shah Jahan, Akbar, Jahangir and Dara Shikoh and may have influenced the costumes and other aspects of his works.

=== The Night Watch ===
The Night Watch or The Militia Company of Captain Frans Banninck Cocq (1642), an oil on canvas portrait now Rijksmuseum, Amsterdam

Rembrandt painted The Militia Company of Captain Frans Banninck Cocq, known as The Night Watch, between 1640 and 1642, and it became his most famous work. The piece was commissioned for the new hall of the Kloveniersdoelen, the musketeer branch of the civic militia. Rembrandt departed from convention on both narrative painting and portraits, which ordered that such genre pieces should be stately and formal. Instead, he created a complex layering of figures in a dramatic depiction of an action, the firing of a musket, affecting some of the characters but not others. The painting is not set at night, its darkness being caused by ageing; and it is not of a watch or patrol, but a ceremony.

The painting has received many interpretations; if as Joseph Manca suggests it was meant to function at multiple levels, many of the interpretations may be correct. Thus, unlike in a conventional narrative painting, the people depicted are represented in lifelike individual portraits. The style seems to show a real event in a real place, but its complex structure appears contrived or theatrical, while the street setting is invented. It can be seen as a picture of a militia charged with keeping order, but it equally looks like a disorderly scene. It alludes to serious works like The School of Athens by Raphael, and has been seen as humorous or parodic. Manca suggests that the calmness of the two officers in the foreground, continuing to carry out their duty despite the disturbance behind them, indicates their "moral excellence"; certainly, their status is clearly indicated, even flattered.

== Expert assessments ==
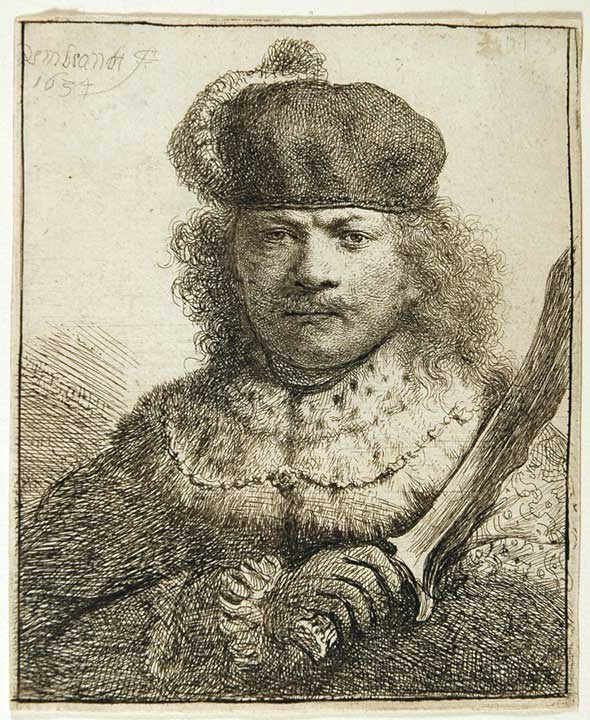
Self-Portrait with Raised Sabre (c. 1634)

In 1968, the Rembrandt Research Project began under the sponsorship of the Netherlands Organisation for the Advancement of Scientific Research; it was initially expected to last a highly optimistic ten years. Art historians teamed up with experts from other fields to reassess the authenticity of works attributed to Rembrandt, using all methods available, including state-of-the-art technical diagnostics, and to compile a complete new catalogue raisonné of his paintings. As a result of their findings, many paintings that were previously attributed to Rembrandt have been removed from their list, although others have been added back.

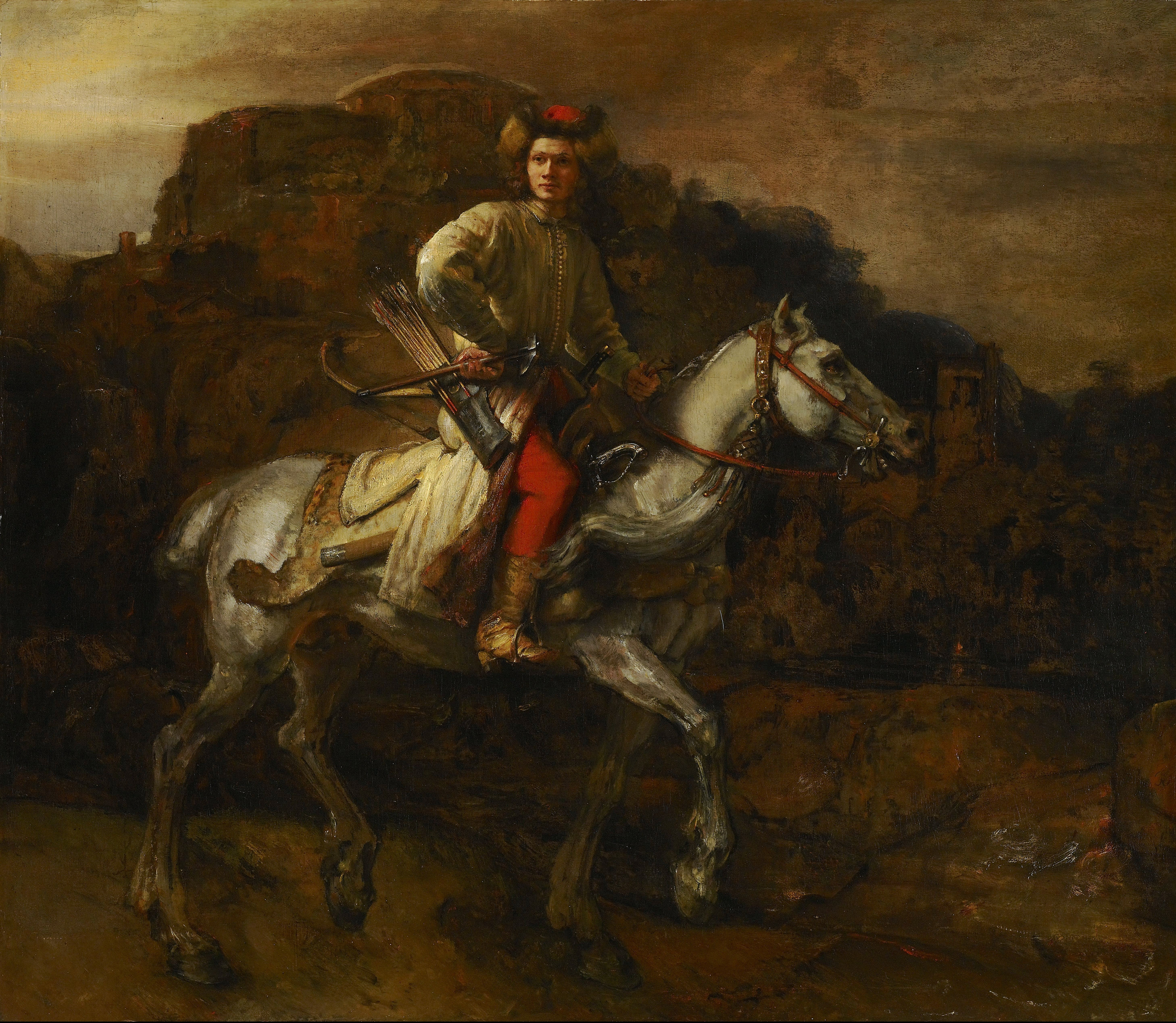
The Polish Rider (c. 1655) is possibly a Lisowczyk on horseback.

One example of activity is The Polish Rider, now in the Frick Collection in New York. Rembrandt's authorship had been questioned by at least one scholar, Alfred von Wurzbach, at the beginning of the twentieth century but for many decades later most scholars, including the foremost authority writing in English, Julius S. Held, agreed that it was indeed by the master. In the 1980s, however, Dr Josua Bruyn of the Foundation Rembrandt Research Project cautiously and tentatively attributed the painting to one of Rembrandt's closest and most talented pupils, Willem Drost, about whom little is known. But Bruyn's remained a minority opinion, the suggestion of Drost's authorship is now generally rejected, and the Frick itself never changed its own attribution, the label still reading "Rembrandt" and not "attributed to" or "school of". More recent opinion has shifted even more decisively in favour of the Frick; In his 1999 book Rembrandt's Eyes, Simon Schama and the Rembrandt Project scholar Ernst van de Wetering (Melbourne Symposium, 1997) both argued for attribution to the master. Those few scholars who still question Rembrandt's authorship feel that the execution is uneven and favour different attributions for different parts of the work.

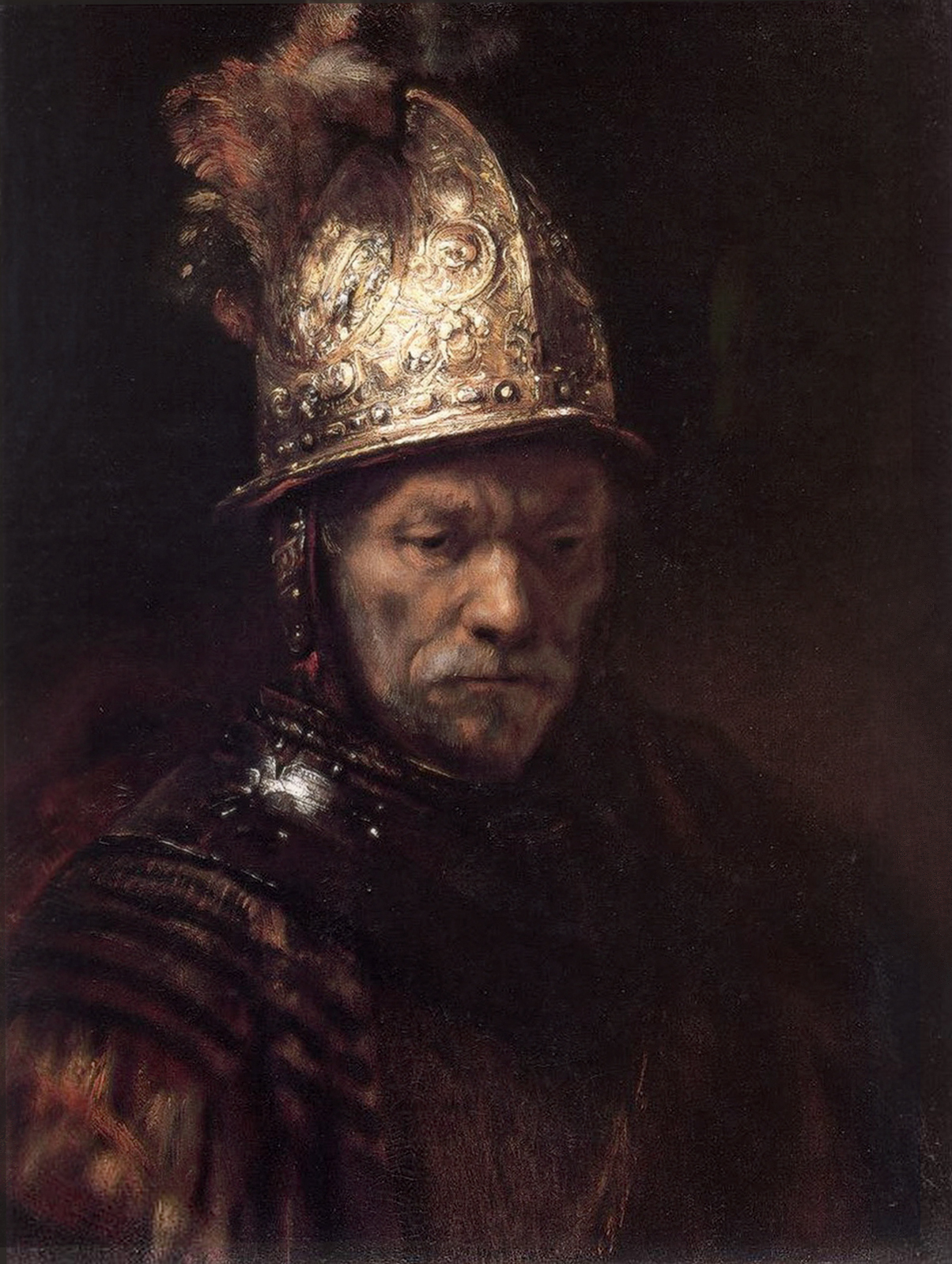
The Man with the Golden Helmet, now Gemäldegalerie, Berlin, was considered one of the most famous Rembrandt portraits but is no longer attributed to the master.

A similar issue was raised by Schama concerning the verification of titles associated with the subject matter depicted in Rembrandt's works. For example, the exact subject being portrayed in Aristotle with a Bust of Homer, recently retitled by curators at the Metropolitan Museum, has been directly challenged by Schama applying the scholarship of Paul Crenshaw. Schama presents a substantial argument that it was the famous ancient Greek painter Apelles who is depicted in contemplation by Rembrandt and not Aristotle.

Another painting, Pilate Washing His Hands, is also of questionable attribution. Critical opinion of this picture has varied since 1905, when Wilhelm von Bode described it as "a somewhat abnormal work" by Rembrandt. "Most scholars since the 1940s have dated the painting to the 1660s and assigned it to an anonymous pupil," possibly Aert de Gelder. The composition bears superficial resemblance to mature works by Rembrandt but lacks the master's command of illumination and modelling.

The attribution and re-attribution work is ongoing. In 2005 four oil paintings previously attributed to Rembrandt's students were reclassified as the work of Rembrandt himself: Study of an Old Man in Profile and Study of an Old Man with a Beard from a US private collection, Study of a Weeping Woman, owned by the Detroit Institute of Arts, and Portrait of an Elderly Woman in a White Bonnet, painted in 1640. The Old Man Sitting in a Chair is a further example: in 2014, Professor Ernst van de Wetering offered his view to The Guardian that the demotion of the 1652 painting Old Man Sitting in a Chair "was a vast mistake...it is a most important painting. The painting needs to be seen in terms of Rembrandt's experimentation". This was highlighted much earlier by Nigel Konstam who studied Rembrandt throughout his career.

Rembrandt's own studio practice is a major factor in the difficulty of attribution, since, like many masters before him, he encouraged his students to copy his paintings, sometimes finishing or retouching them to be sold as originals, and sometimes selling them as authorised copies. Additionally, his style proved easy enough for his most talented students to emulate. Further complicating matters is the uneven quality of some of Rembrandt's own work, and his frequent stylistic evolutions and experiments. As well, there were later imitations of his work, and restorations which so seriously damaged the original works that they are no longer recognisable.

== Painting materials ==
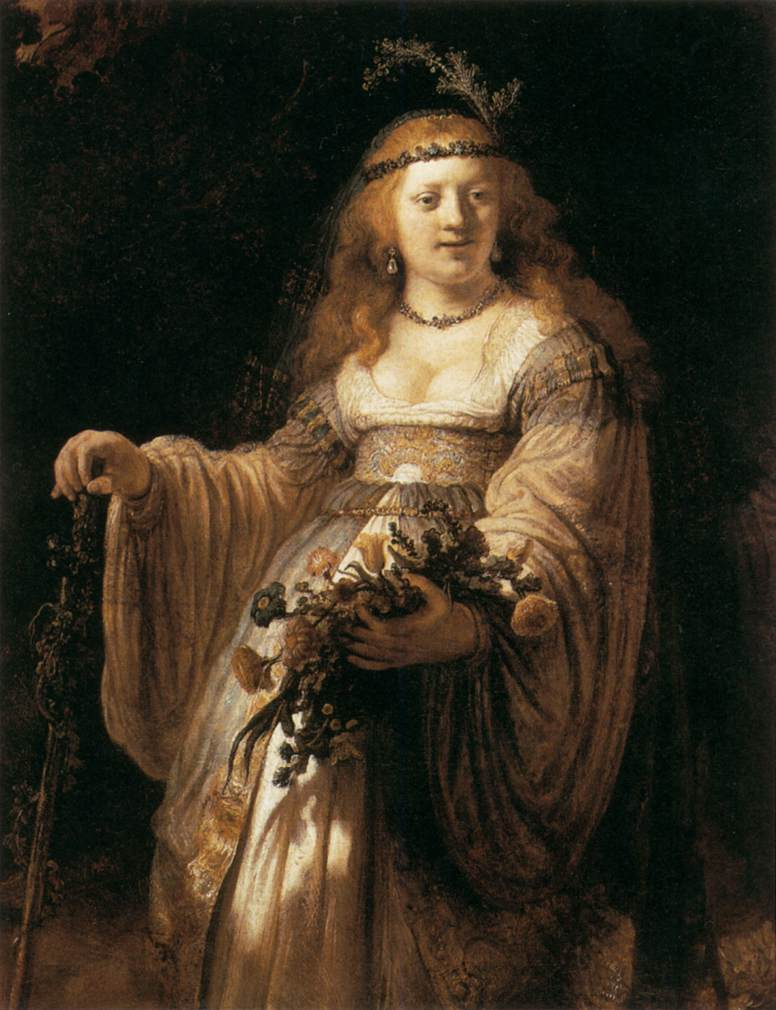
Saskia as Flora (1635)

Technical investigation of Rembrandt's paintings in the possession of the Gemäldegalerie Alte Meister and in the Gemäldegalerie Alte Meister (Kassel) was conducted by Hermann Kühn in 1977. The pigment analyses of some thirty paintings have shown that Rembrandt's palette consisted of the following pigments: lead white, various ochres, van Dyke brown, bone black, charcoal black, lamp black, vermilion, madder lake, azurite, ultramarine, yellow lake and lead-tin-yellow. Synthetic orpiment was shown in the shadows of the sleeve of the jewish groom. This toxic arsenic yellow was rarely used in oil painting. One painting (Saskia van Uylenburgh as Flora) reportedly contains gamboge. Rembrandt very rarely used pure blue or green colours, the most pronounced exception being Belshazzar's Feast in the National Gallery in London.

The book by Bomford describes more recent technical investigations and pigment analyses of Rembrandt's paintings predominantly in the National Gallery in London. The entire array of pigments employed by Rembrandt can be found at ColourLex. The best source for technical information on Rembrandt's paintings on the web is the Rembrandt Database containing all works of Rembrandt with detailed investigative reports, infrared and radiography images and other scientific details.

== Name and signature ==
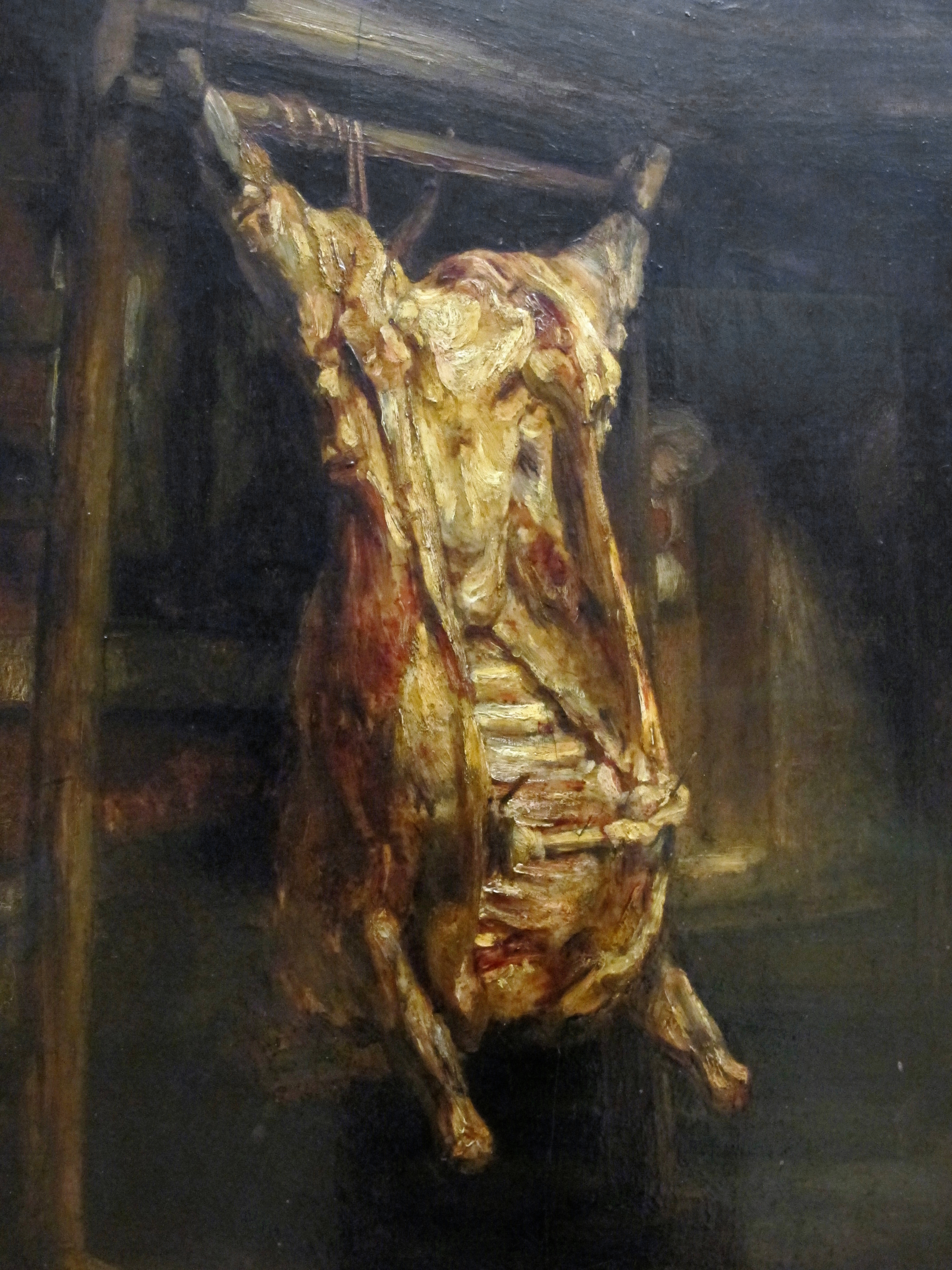
Slaughtered Ox (1655), Louvre

"Rembrandt" is a modification of the spelling of the artist's first name that he introduced in 1633. The patronymic "Harmenszoon" indicates that his father's name is Harmen. "van Rijn" indicates that his family lived near the Rhine.

Rembrandt's earliest signatures (c. 1625) consisted of an initial "R", or the monogram "RH" (for Rembrant Harmenszoon), and starting in 1629, "RHL" (the "L" stood, presumably, for Leiden). In 1632, he used this monogram early in the year, then added his family name to it, "RHL-van Rijn" but replaced this form in that same year and began using his first name alone with its original spelling, "Rembrant". In 1633 he added a "d", and maintained this form consistently from then on, proving that this minor change had a meaning for him (whatever it might have been). This change is purely visual; it does not change the way his name is pronounced. Despite the large number of paintings and etchings signed with this modified first name, most of the documents that mentioned him during his lifetime retained the original "Rembrant" spelling. (Note: the rough chronology of signature forms above applies to the paintings, and to a lesser degree to the etchings; from 1632, presumably, there is only one etching signed "RHL-v. Rijn", the large-format "Raising of Lazarus", B 73).

His practice of signing his work with his first name, later followed by Vincent van Gogh, was probably inspired by Raphael, Leonardo da Vinci and Michelangelo who, then as now, were referred to by their first names alone.

== Workshop ==
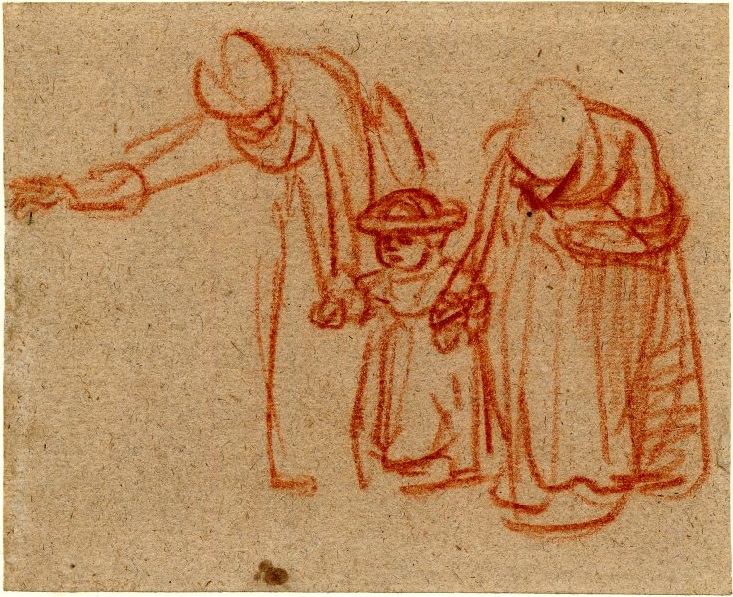
One of van de Cappelle's 500 Rembrandt drawings

Rembrandt ran a large workshop and had many pupils. The list of Rembrandt pupils from his period in Leiden as well as his time in Amsterdam is quite long, mostly because his influence on painters around him was so great that it is difficult to tell whether someone worked for him in his studio or just copied his style for patrons eager to acquire a Rembrandt. A partial list should include Ferdinand Bol, Adriaen Brouwer, Gerrit Dou, Willem Drost, Heiman Dullaart, Gerbrand van den Eeckhout, Carel Fabritius, Govert Flinck, Hendrick Fromantiou, Aert de Gelder, Samuel Dirksz van Hoogstraten, Abraham Janssens, Godfrey Kneller, Philip de Koninck, Jacob Levecq, Nicolaes Maes, Jürgen Ovens, Christopher Paudiß, Willem de Poorter, Jan Victors, and Willem van der Vliet.

== Museum collections ==
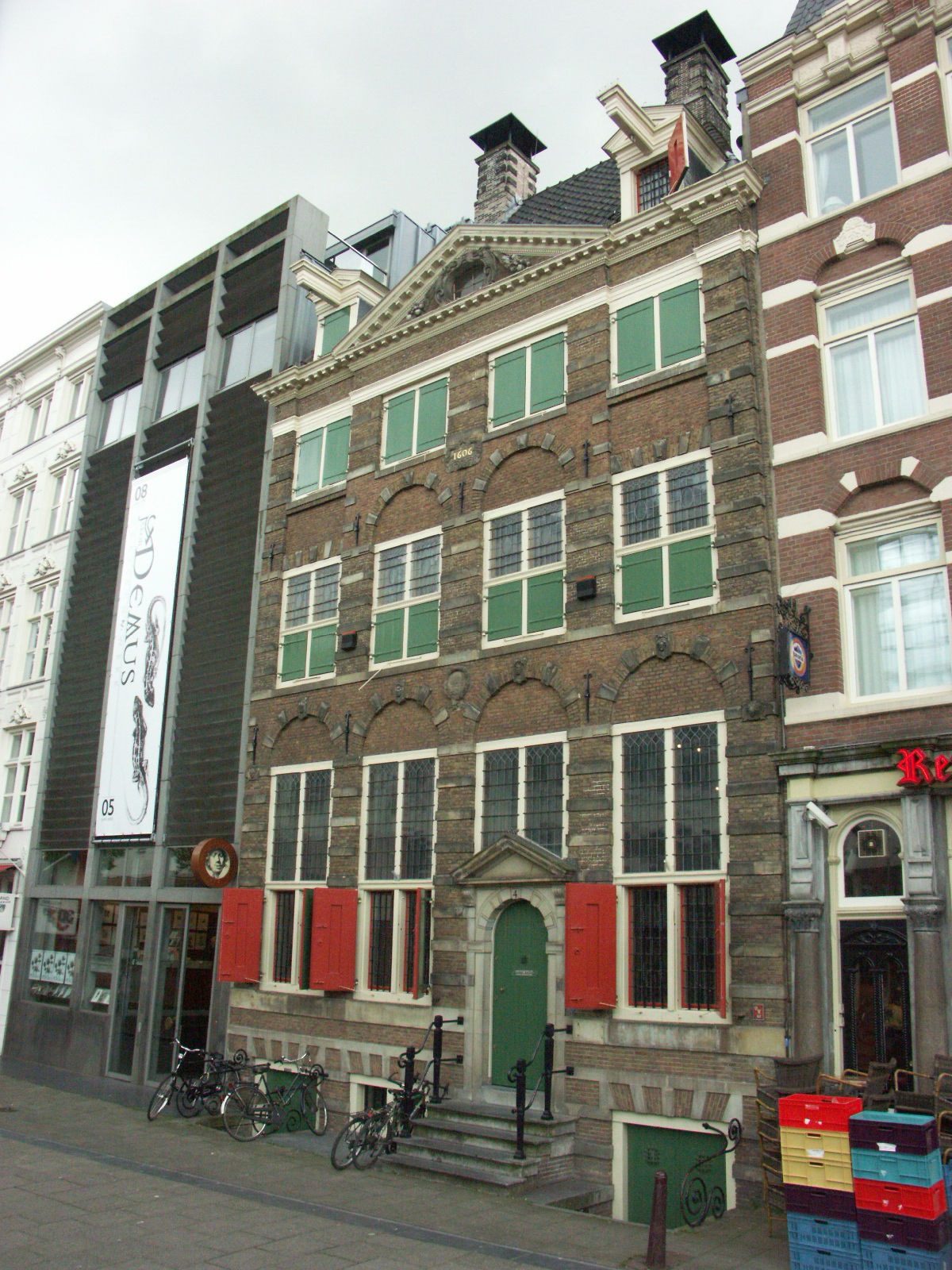
The Rembrandt House Museum, Amsterdam

The United States has the largest number of Rembrandt's paintings, spread over several museums including the Metropolitan Museum of Art (mostly portraits) and the Frick Collection in New York City, the National Gallery of Art in Washington, D.C., Museum of Fine Arts in Boston, and J. Paul Getty Museum in Los Angeles, in total 86 paintings. Other large groups are in Germany, with 69 paintings, at the Gemäldegalerie in Berlin, Gemäldegalerie Alte Meister in Dresden, and Schloss Wilhelmshöhe in Kassel, and elsewhere. The UK has a total of 51, especially in the National Gallery and Royal Collection. There are 49 in the Netherlands, many in the Rijksmuseum, which has The Night Watch and The Jewish Bride, and the Mauritshuis in The Hague. Others can be found in The Louvre, the Hermitage Museum, and Nationalmuseum, Stockholm. The Royal Castle in Warsaw has two paintings by Rembrandt.

Large collections of Rembrandt's drawings are held in the Rijksmuseum, Louvre, and British Museum. The Rembrandt House Museum holds many of his drawings and "almost all" the etchings, a selection of which are on rotating display in the house.

Apart from a few very rare prints, mostly less important early studies, or "the informal printed scribbles from the artist's early years", most of his prints are not very rare by museum standards, and major print rooms have good collections. Both the Rijksmuseum and the British Museum, who claim to have the best collections, have over 1,000 impressions of the 300-odd prints; most of these can be viewed in great detail online. The degree to which these collections are displayed to the public or can easily be viewed by them in the print room, varies greatly. The Morgan Library & Museum in New York claims to have the best collection in the United States, with "impressions of most of the three hundred or so known etchings by Rembrandt, as well as multiple, often exceedingly rare impressions of various states"; it has "almost 500" images online.

Impressions often continued to be printed by others until at least the 19th-century, with many of the plates reworked as they became worn. In 1986, 79 of Rembrandt's original copper plates still existed.

== Selected works ==
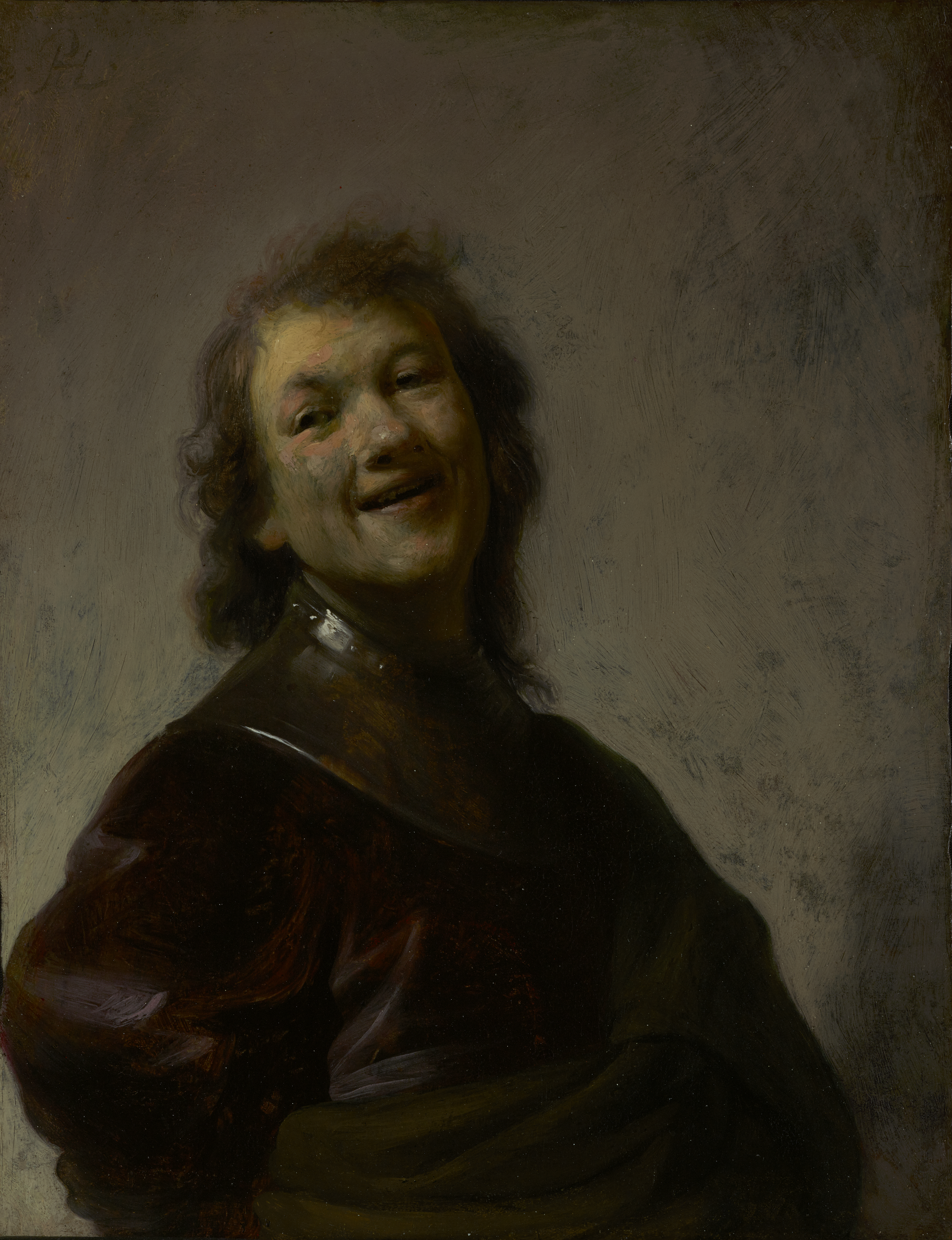
Rembrandt Laughing (1628), J. Paul Getty Museum, Malibu

- The Entombment of Christ (c. 1624) – Hunterian Museum and Art Gallery, Glasgow
- The Stoning of Saint Stephen (1625) – Musée des Beaux-Arts, Lyon
- Andromeda Chained to the Rocks (1630) – Mauritshuis, The Hague
- Old Man with a Gold Chain (c. 1631) – Art Institute of Chicago
- Jacob de Gheyn III (1632) – Dulwich Picture Gallery, London
- Philosopher in Meditation (1632) – The Louvre, Paris
- The Anatomy Lesson of Dr. Nicolaes Tulp (1632) – Mauritshuis, The Hague
- Judith at the Banquet of Holofernes (1634) – Museo del Prado, Madrid
- Descent from the Cross (1634) – Hermitage Museum, St. Petersburg.
- Belshazzar's Feast (c. 1635-1638) – National Gallery, London
- The Prodigal Son in the Tavern (c. 1635) – Gemäldegalerie Alte Meister, Dresden
- Danaë (c. 1635, reworked before 1643) – Hermitage Museum, St. Petersburg
- The Scholar at the Lectern (1641) – Royal Castle, Warsaw
- The Girl in a Picture Frame (1641) – Royal Castle, Warsaw
- The Night Watch, formally The Militia Company of Captain Frans Banning Cocq (1642) – Rijksmuseum, Amsterdam
- Boaz and Ruth (1643) – Woburn Abbey, Bedfordshire & Gemaldegalerie, Berlin
- The Mill (1645/48) – National Gallery of Art, Washington, D.C.
- Susanna and the Elders (1647) – Gemäldegalerie, Berlin
- Christ Healing the Sick, also known as the Hundred Guilder Print (c. 1648) – Allen Memorial Art Museum, Oberlin, Ohio. Name derives from a print seller who claimed to have sold an impression of the print back to Rembrandt for 100 Guilders.
- Head of Christ (1648) – Gemäldegalerie, Berlin
- Aristotle Contemplating a Bust of Homer (1653) – Metropolitan Museum of Art, New York
- The Three Crosses (1653) – Museum of Fine Arts, Boston
- Bathsheba at Her Bath (1654) – The Louvre, Paris
- Christ Presented to the People (c. 1655) – Various versions at different museums. One of the two largest prints made by Rembrandt.
- Pallas Athena (c. 1657) – Calouste Gulbenkian Museum, Lisbon
- Portrait of Dirck van Os (c. 1658) – Joslyn Art Museum, Omaha, Nebraska
- Self-Portrait with Beret and Turned-Up Collar (1659) – National Gallery of Art, Washington, D.C.
- Ahasuerus and Haman at the Feast of Esther (1660) – Pushkin Museum, Moscow
- The Conspiracy of Claudius Civilis (c. 1661-1662) – Nationalmuseum, Stockholm. The majority of the original painting is now lost as Rembrandt cut it up in order for it to be sold. It is also his last secular history painting.
- Syndics of the Drapers' Guild (1662) – Rijksmuseum, Amsterdam
- The Jewish Bride (c. 1665-1669) – Rijksmuseum, Amsterdam
- Haman before Esther (1665) – National Museum of Art of Romania, Bucharest
- Self-Portrait at the Age of 63 (1669) – National Gallery, London. One of Rembrandt's last self-portraits.
- The Return of the Prodigal Son (1669) – Hermitage Museum, St. Petersburg. One of Rembrandt's last paintings.

== Exhibitions ==
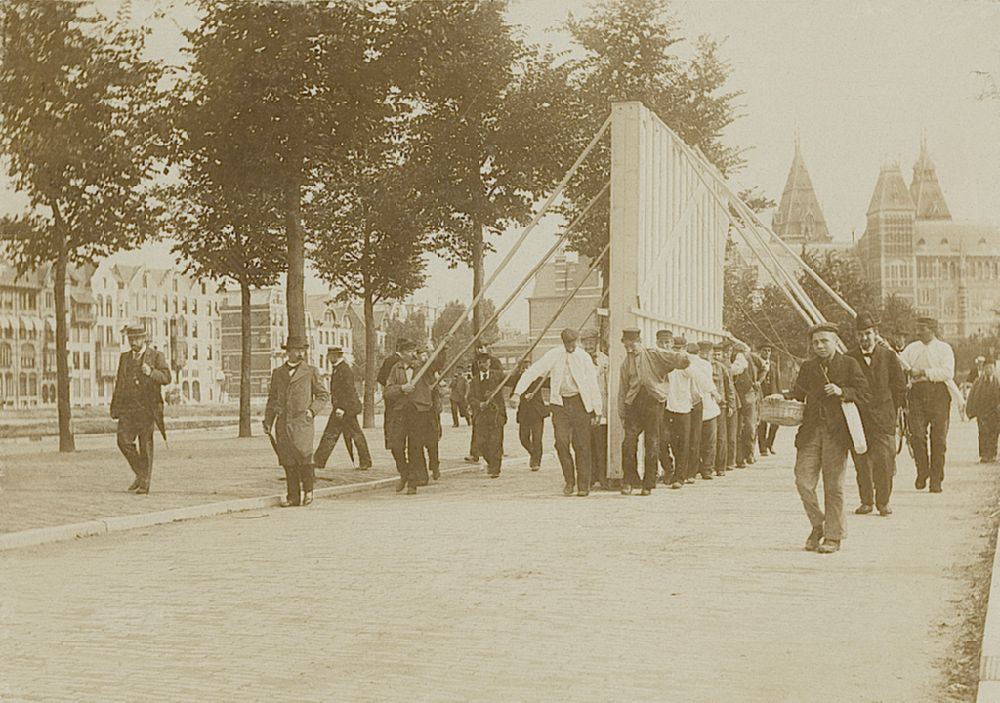
Moving Rembrandt's The Night Watch for the 1898 Rembrandt Exhibition

- Sept–Oct 1898: Rembrandt Tentoonstelling (Rembrandt Exhibition), Stedelijk Museum, Amsterdam, the Netherlands.
- Jan–Feb 1899: Rembrandt Tentoonstelling (Rembrandt Exhibition), Royal Academy, London.
- 30 January – 1 May 2005: Rembrandt's Religious Etchings, National Gallery of Art
- 30 January – 1 May 2005: Rembrandt's Late Religious Portraits, National Gallery of Art, traveled to the J. Paul Getty Museum, Los Angeles, 7 June - 28 August 2005 catalogue by Arthur K. Wheelock Jr.
- 21 April 2011 – 18 July 2011: Rembrandt and the Face of Jesus, Musée du Louvre.
- 22 February 2012 – 17 June 2012: Where Darkness Meets Light: Rembrandt and His Contemporaries – The Golden Age of Dutch Art, Sakıp Sabancı Museum, Istanbul.
- 23 February – 20 May 2012: Rembrandt and Degas: Portrait of the Artist as a Young Man, Metropolitan Museum of Art.
- 16 September 2013 – 14 November 2013: Rembrandt: The Consummate Etcher, Syracuse University Art Galleries.
- 19 May 2014 – 27 June 2014: From Rembrandt to Rosenquist: Works on Paper from the NAC's Permanent Collection, National Arts Club.
- 19 October 2014 – 4 January 2015: Rembrandt, Rubens, Gainsborough and the Golden Age of Painting in Europe, Jule Collins Smith Museum of Art.
- 15 October 2014 – 18 January 2015: Rembrandt: The Late Works, The National Gallery, London.
- 12 February 2015 – 17 May 2015: Late Rembrandt, The Rijksmuseum, Amsterdam.
- 16 September 2018 – 6 January 2019: Rembrandt – Painter as Printmaker, Denver Art Museum, Denver.
- 24 August 2019 – 1 December 2019: Leiden circa 1630: Rembrandt Emerges, Agnes Etherington Art Centre, Kingston, Ontario.
- 4 October 2019 – 2 February 2020: Rembrandt's Light, Dulwich Picture Gallery, London.
- 18 February 2020 – 30 August 2020: Rembrandt and Amsterdam portraiture, 1590–1670 , Museo Nacional Thyssen-Bornemisza, Madrid.
- 10 August 2020 – 1 November 2020: Young Rembrandt, Ashmolean Museum, Oxford.
- 18 November 2023 – 19 February 2024 Rembrandt: Etchings from the Museum Boijmans Van Beuningen, Worcester Art Museum, Worcester, Massachusetts.

== Paintings ==
=== Self-portraits ===
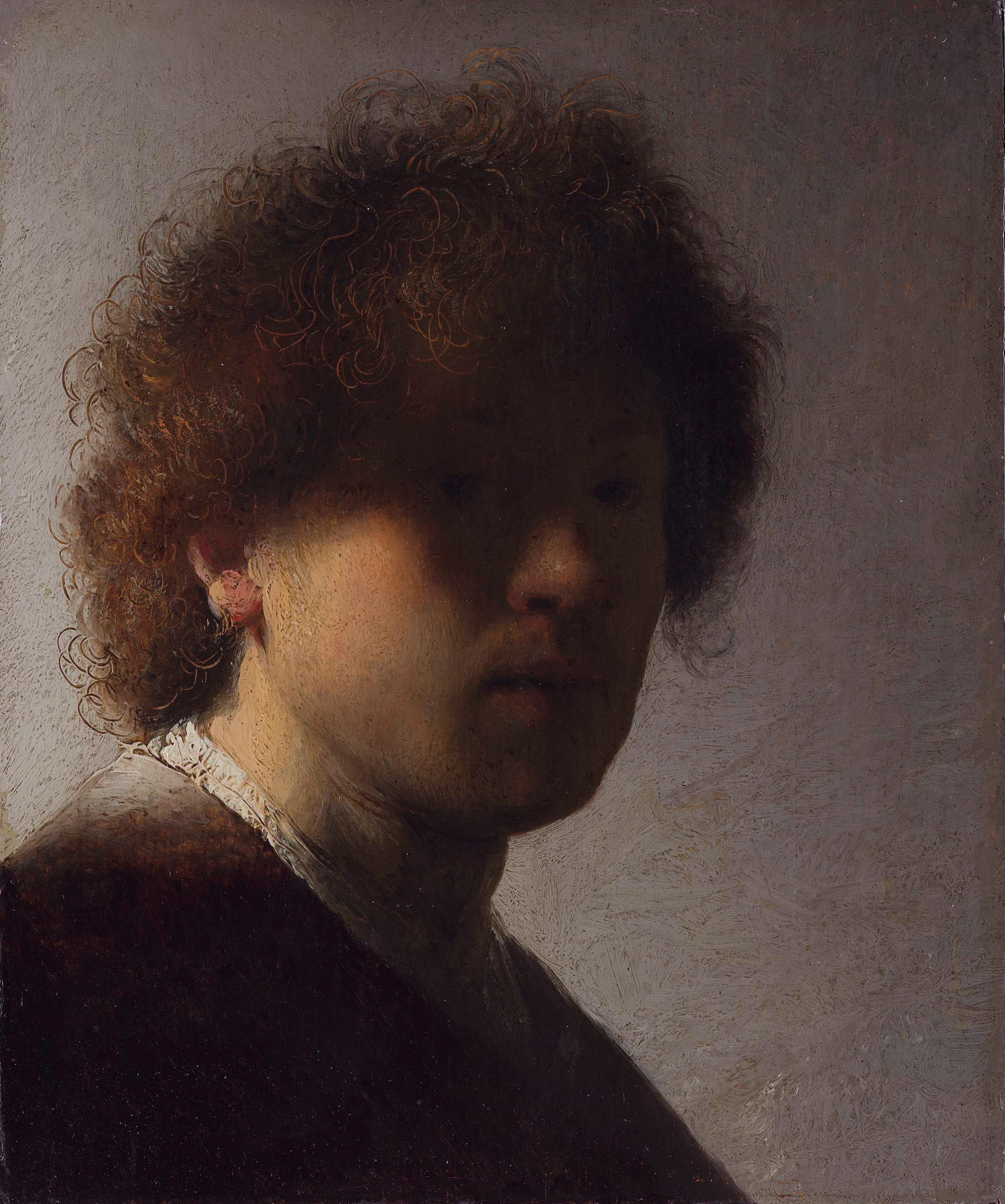
A young Rembrandt (c. 1628) when he was 22. Partly an exercise in chiaroscuro. Rijksmuseum

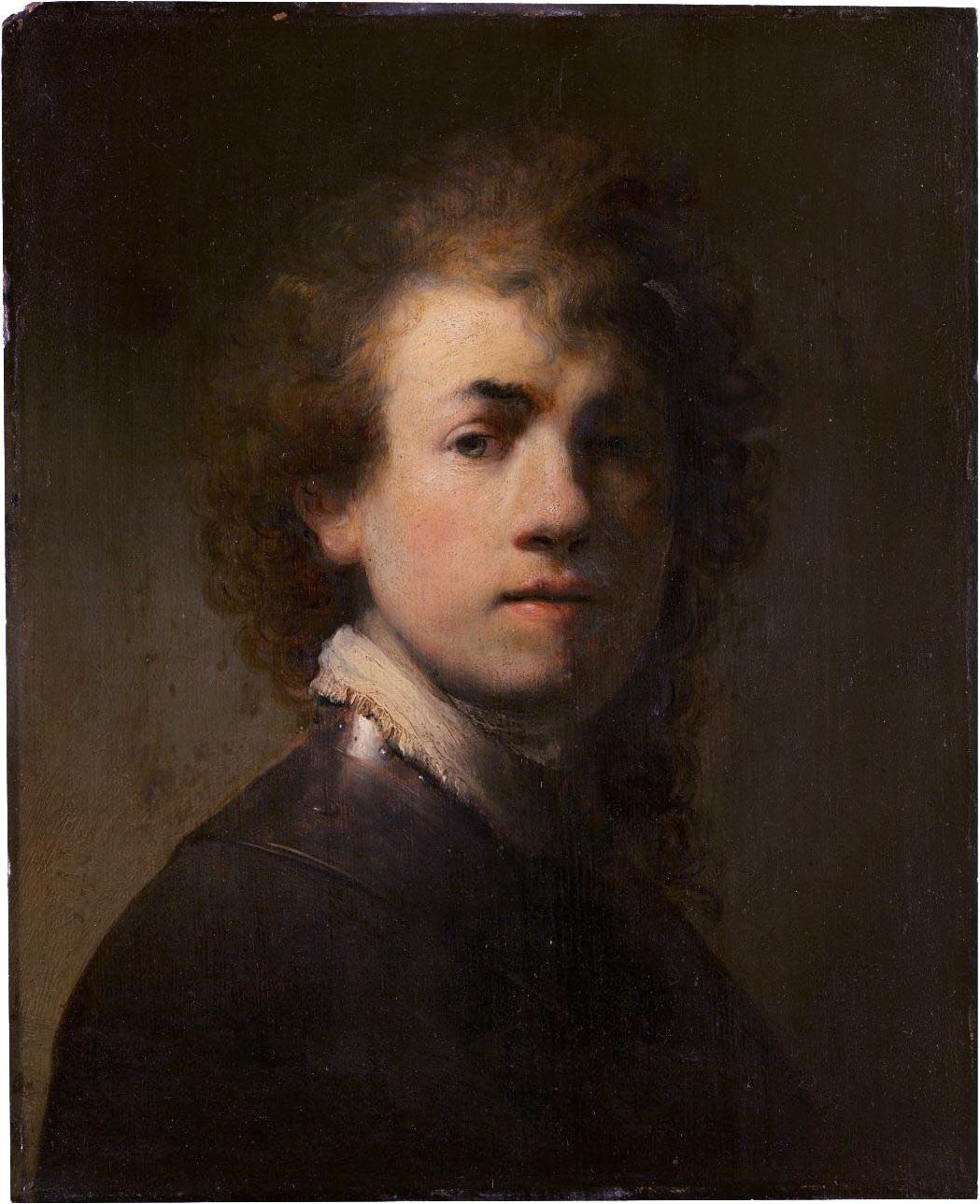
Self-Portrait in a Gorget (c. 1629), Germanisches Nationalmuseum, Nuremberg

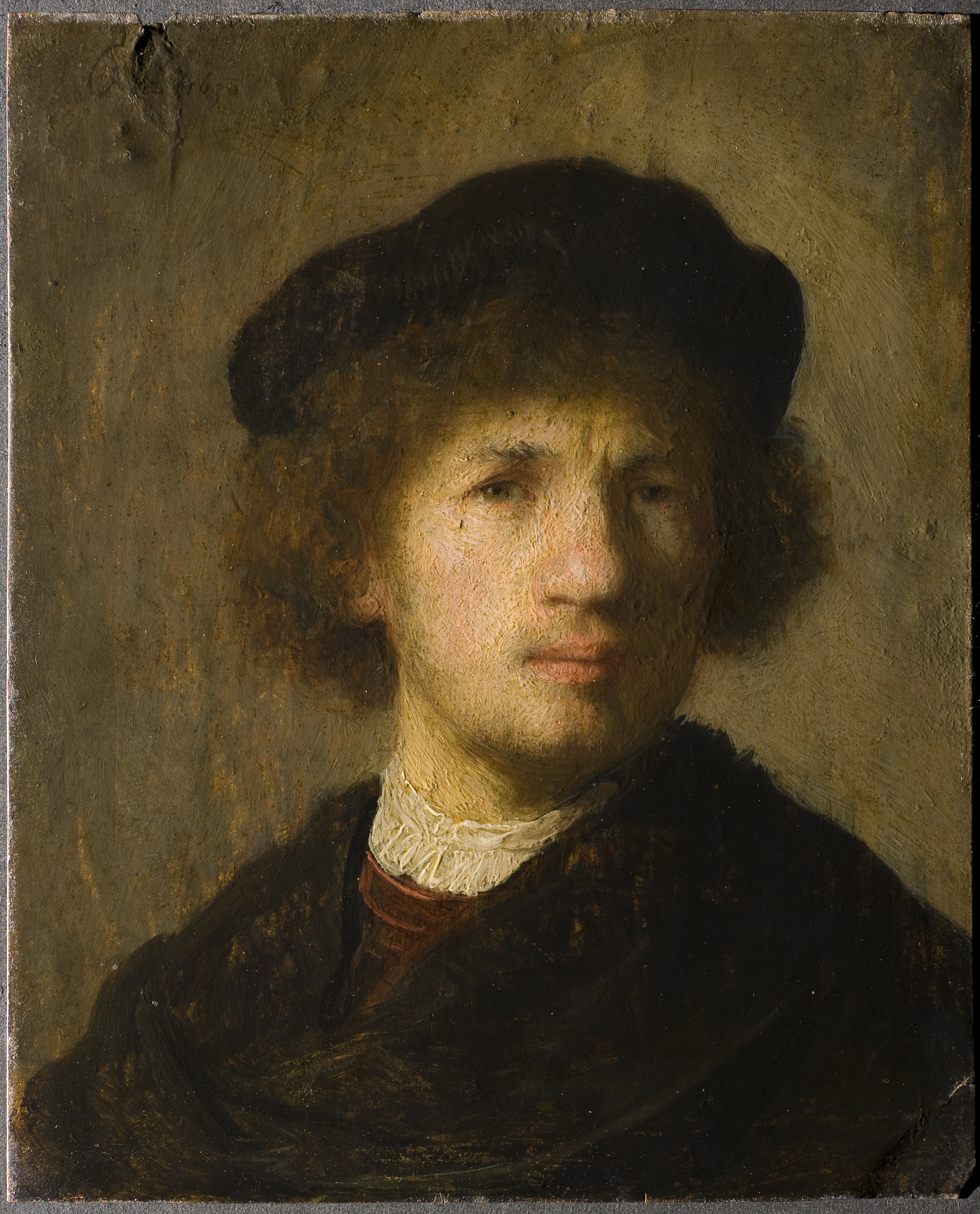
Self-portrait (1630), Nationalmuseum, Stockholm

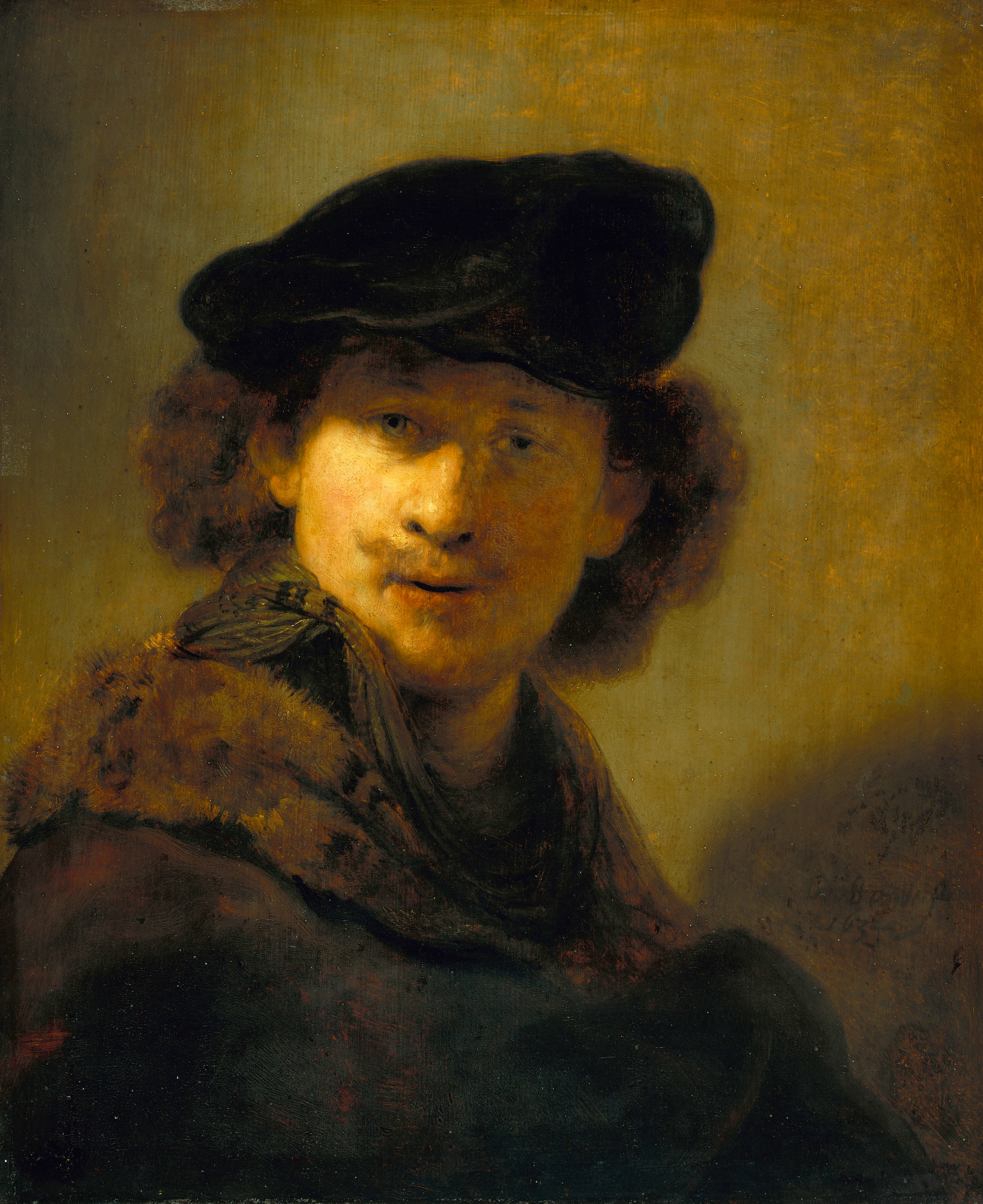
Self-Portrait with Velvet Beret and Furred Mantle (1634)

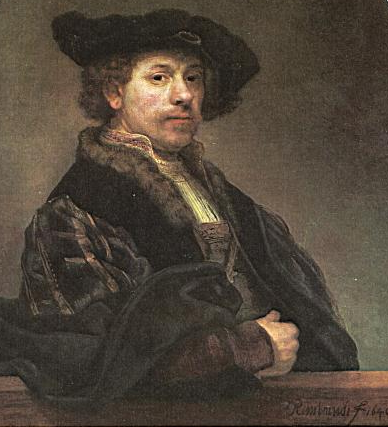
Self-Portrait at the Age of 34 (1640), National Gallery London

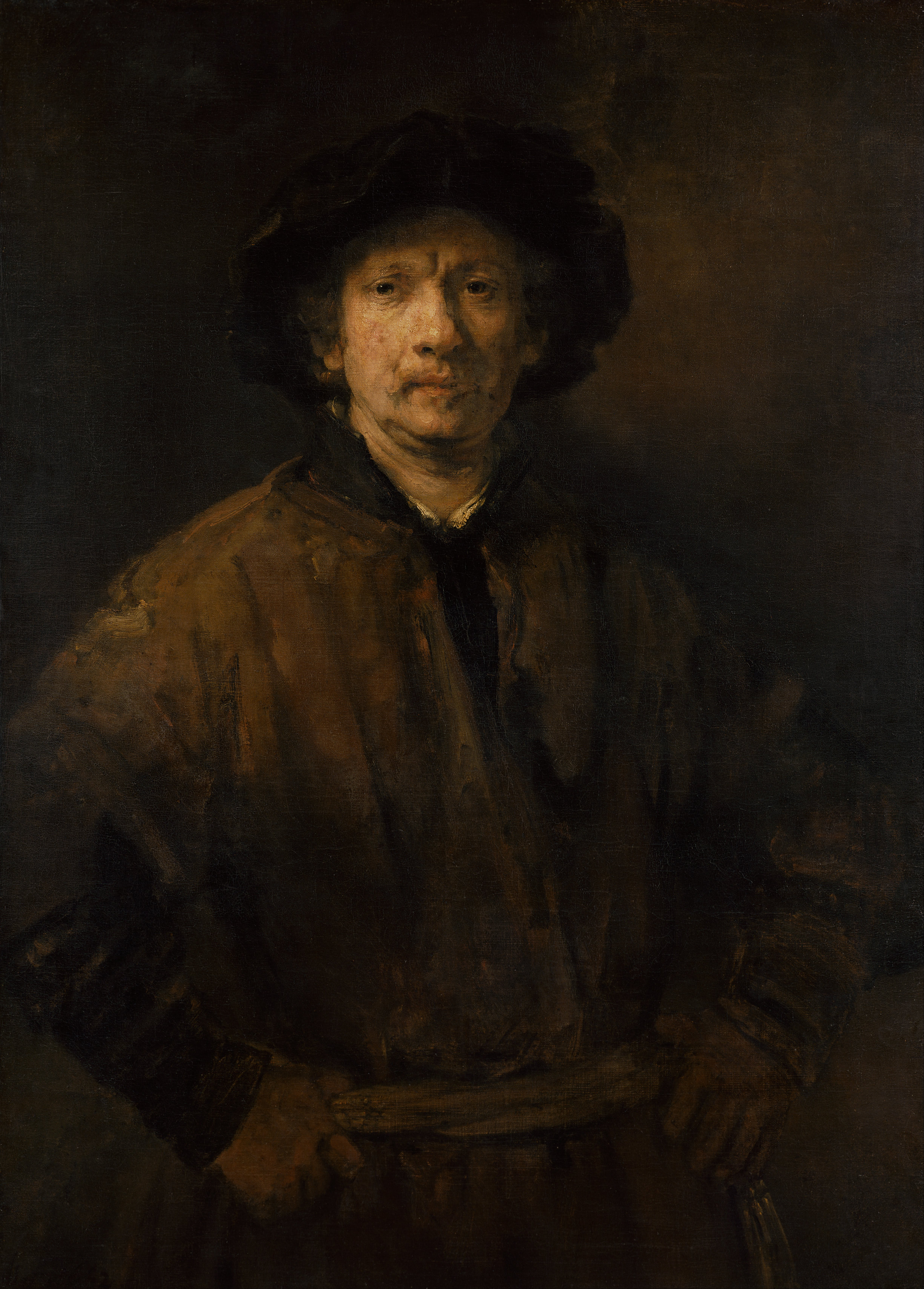
Self-Portrait, an oil on canvas portrait (1652), Kunsthistorisches Museum, Vienna

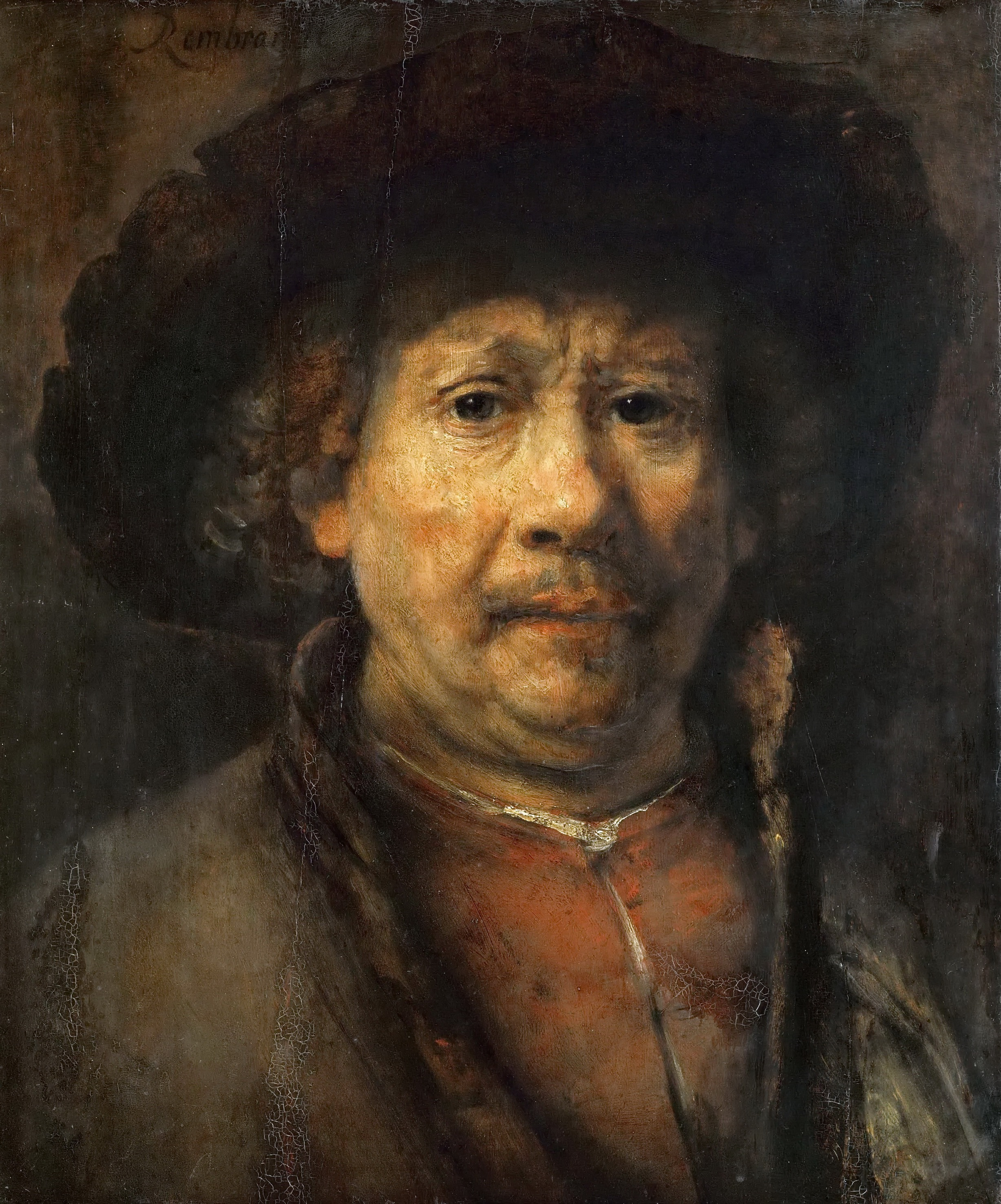
Self-portrait (1655) an oil on walnut portrait cut down in size, Kunsthistorisches Museum, Vienna

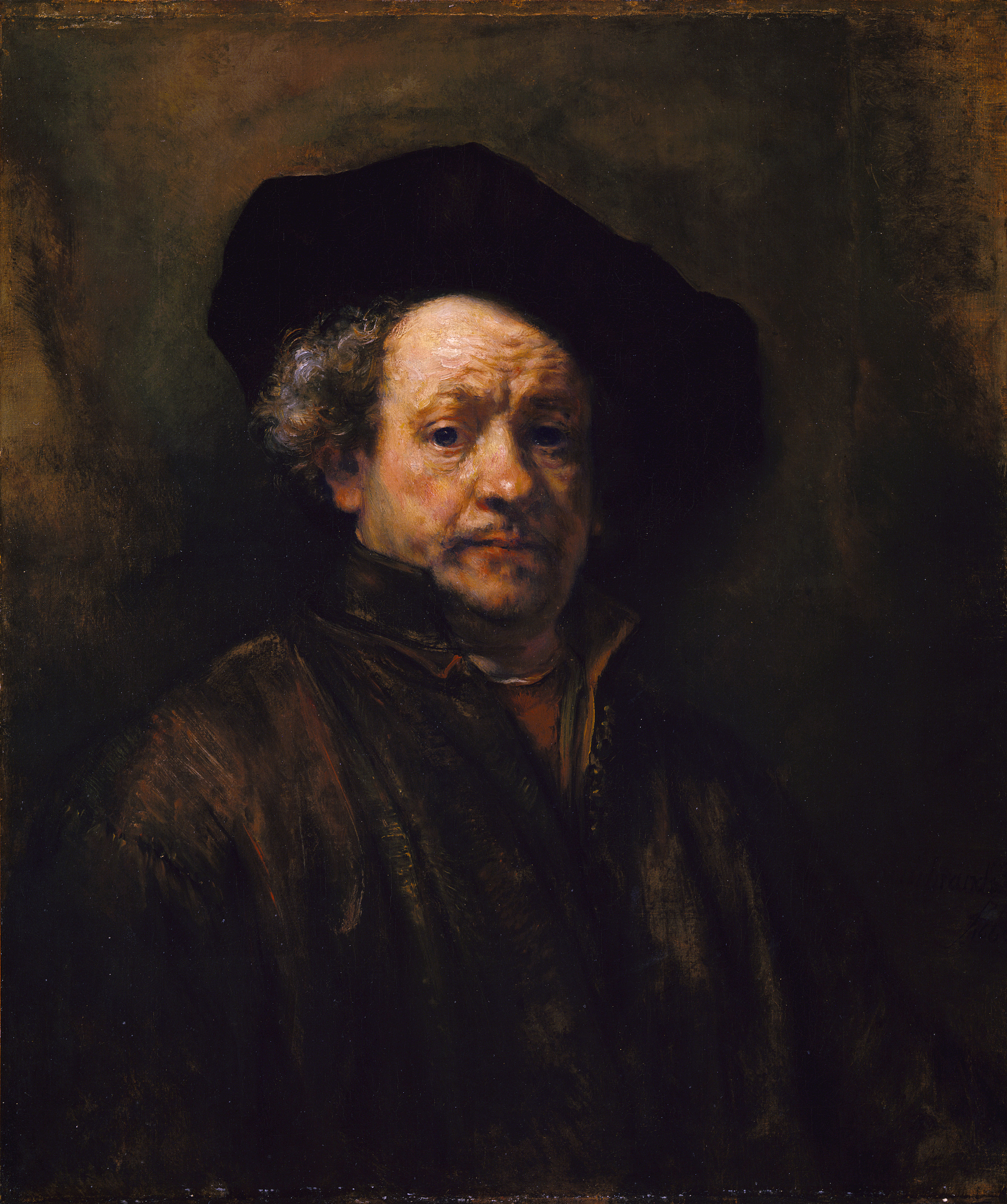
Self-Portrait (1660)

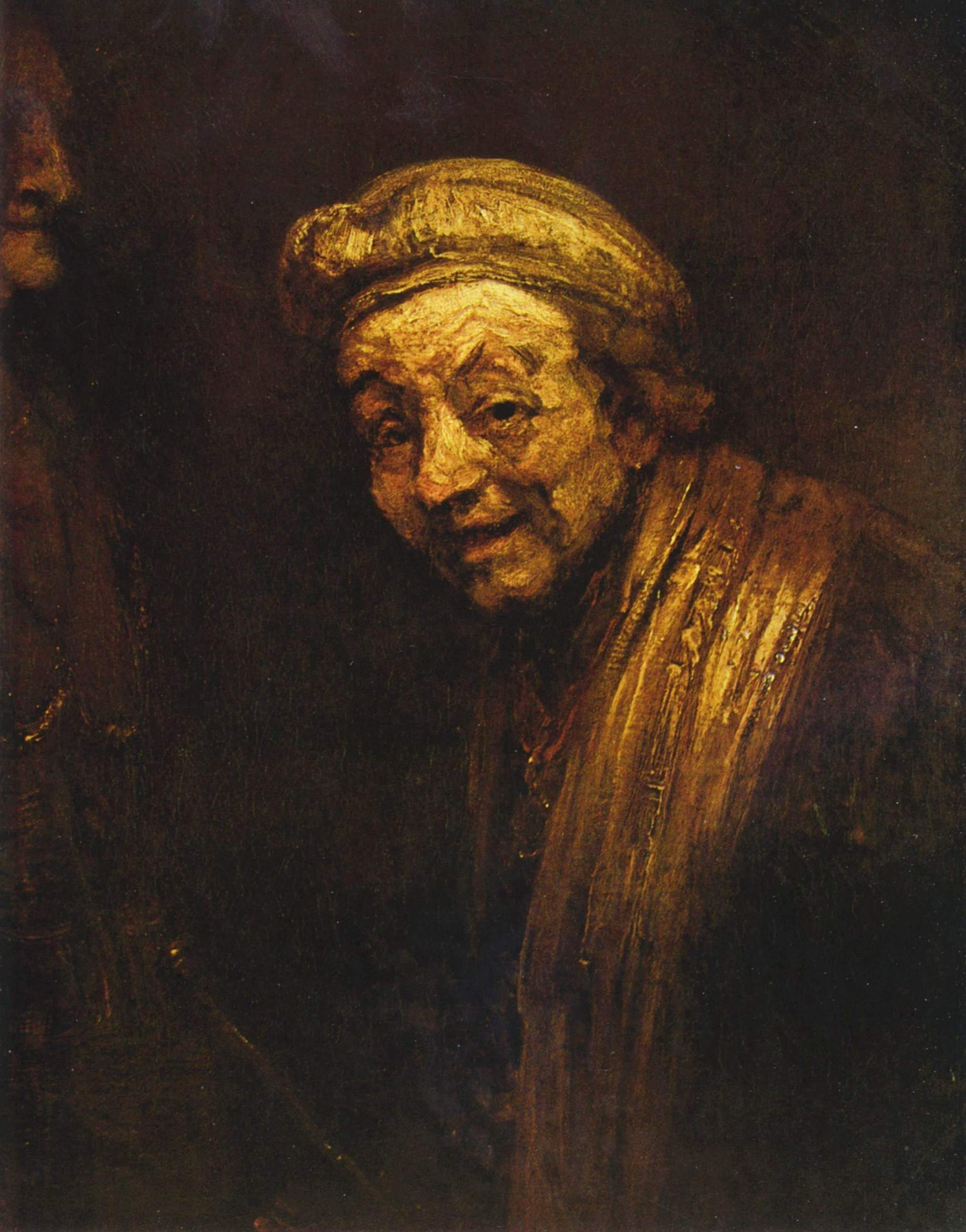
Self Portrait as Zeuxis (c. 1662), one of two self-portraits in which Rembrandt is turned to the left, Wallraf–Richartz Museum, Cologne

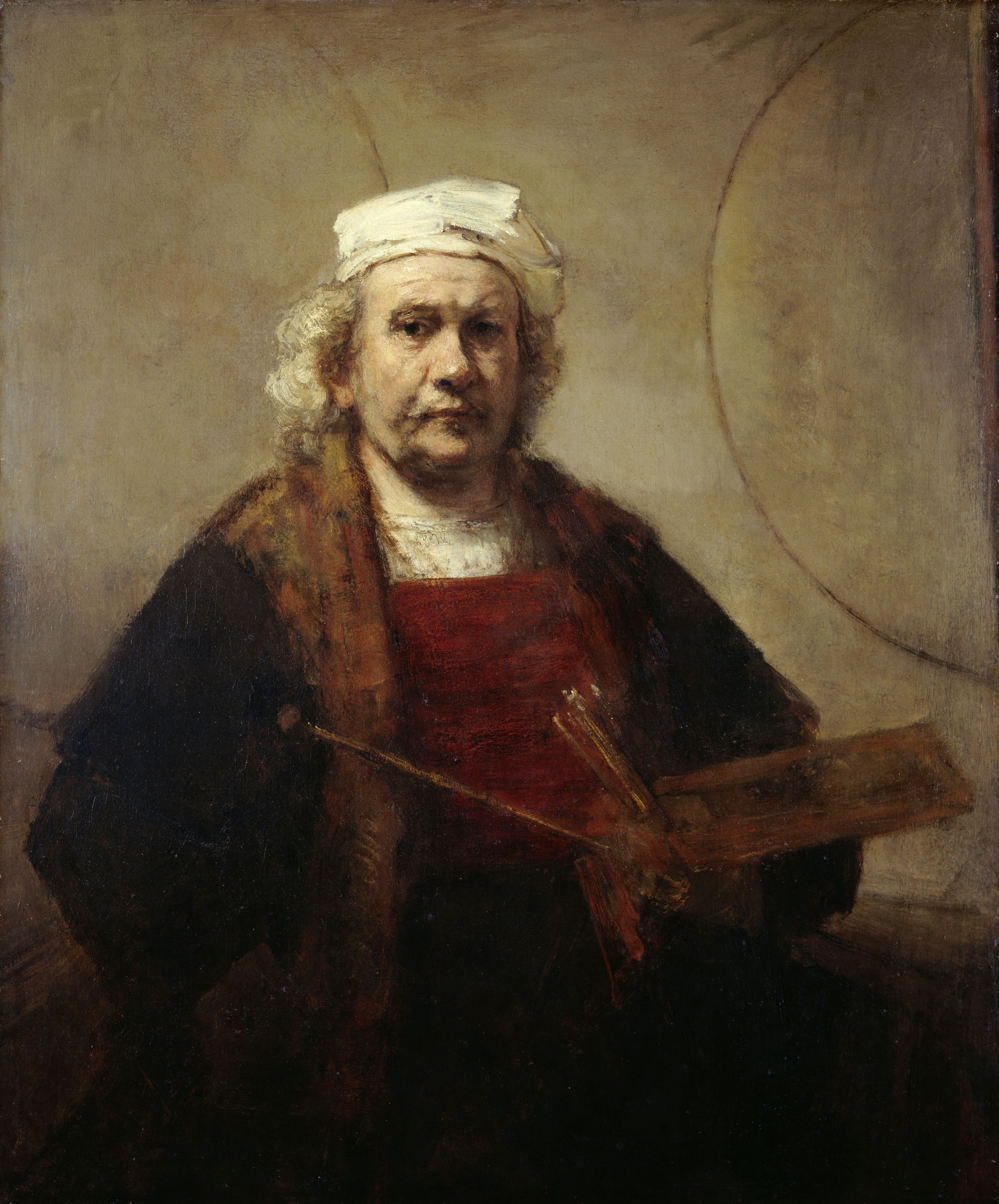
Self-Portrait with Two Circles (c. 1665–69), Kenwood House, London

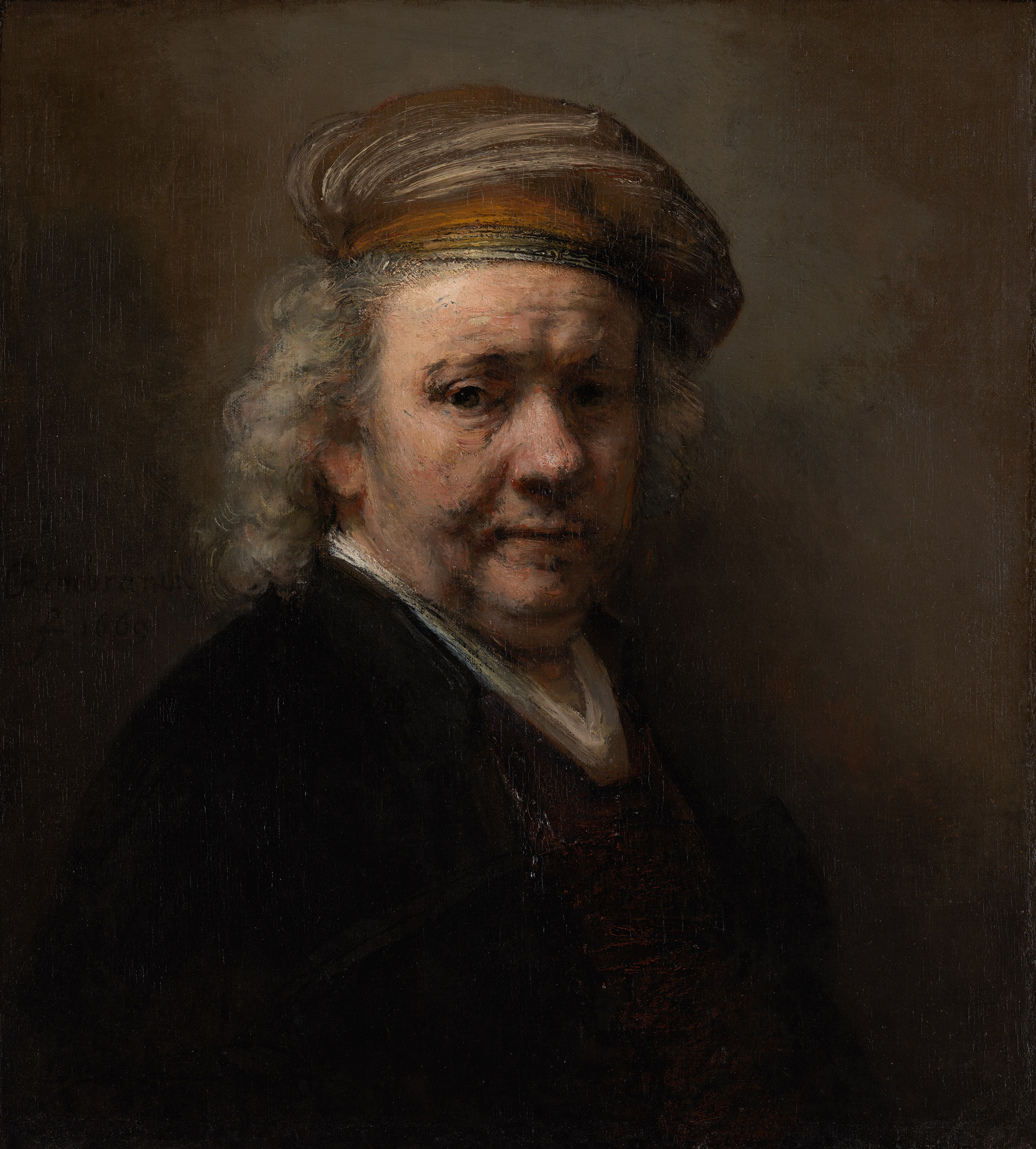
Self-portrait (1669)

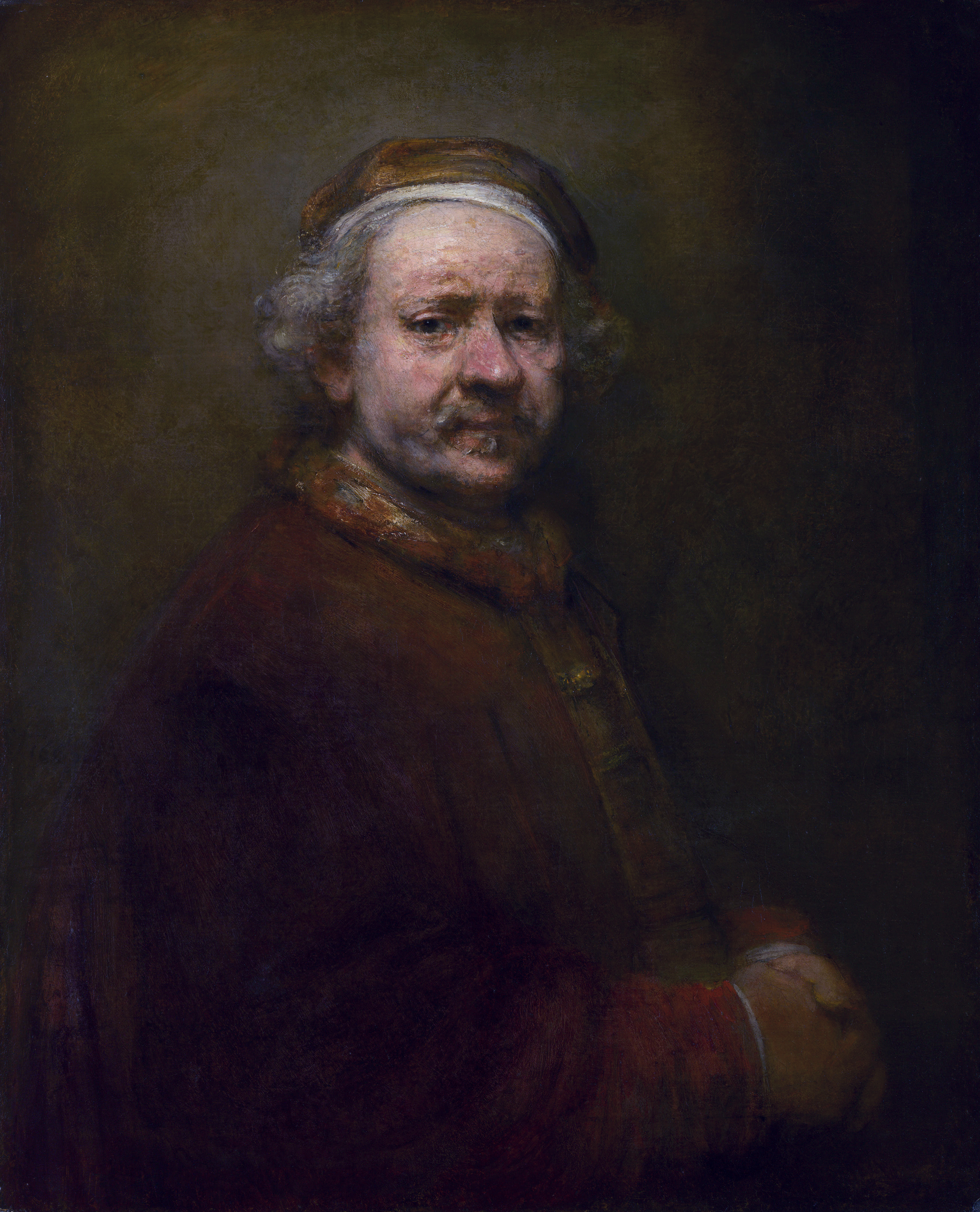
Self-Portrait at the Age of 63 (1669, the year he died), National Gallery, London

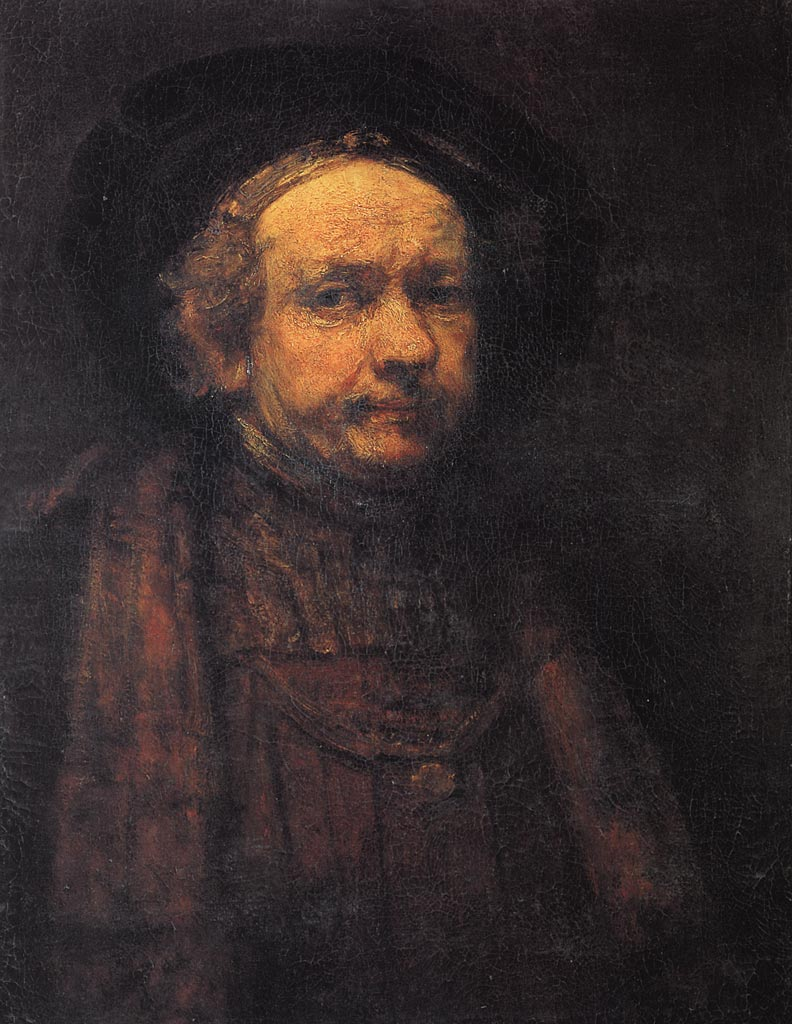
Self-portrait, 1668–69, Galleria degli Uffizi, Florence

=== Other major paintings ===
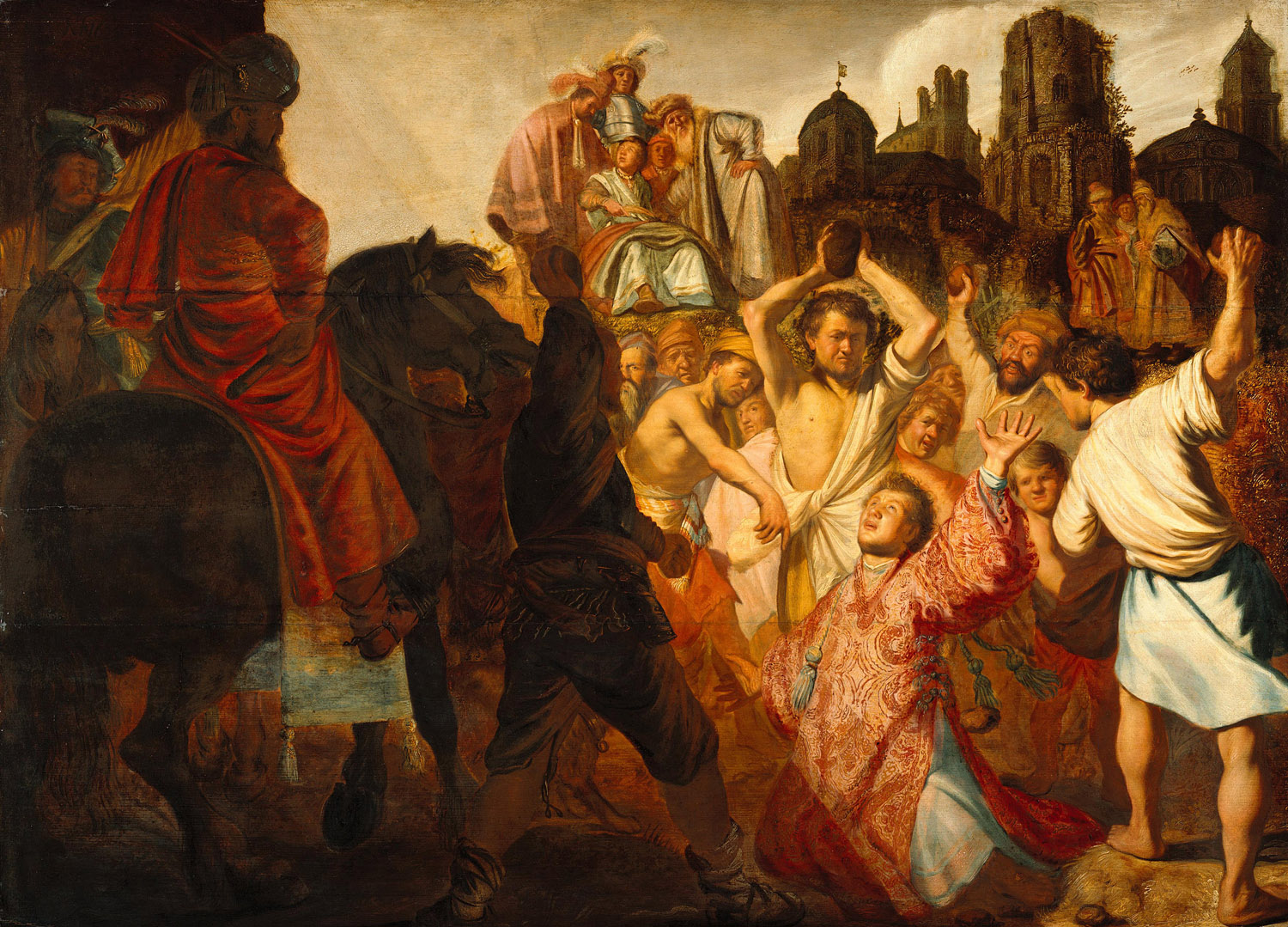
The Stoning of Saint Stephen (1625), Rembrandt's first painting completed at the age of 19, Musée des Beaux-Arts de Lyon.

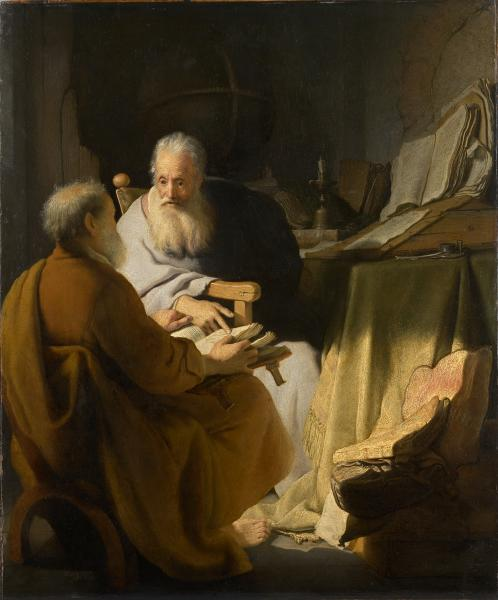
Two old men disputing (1628) at the National Gallery of Victoria in Melbourne

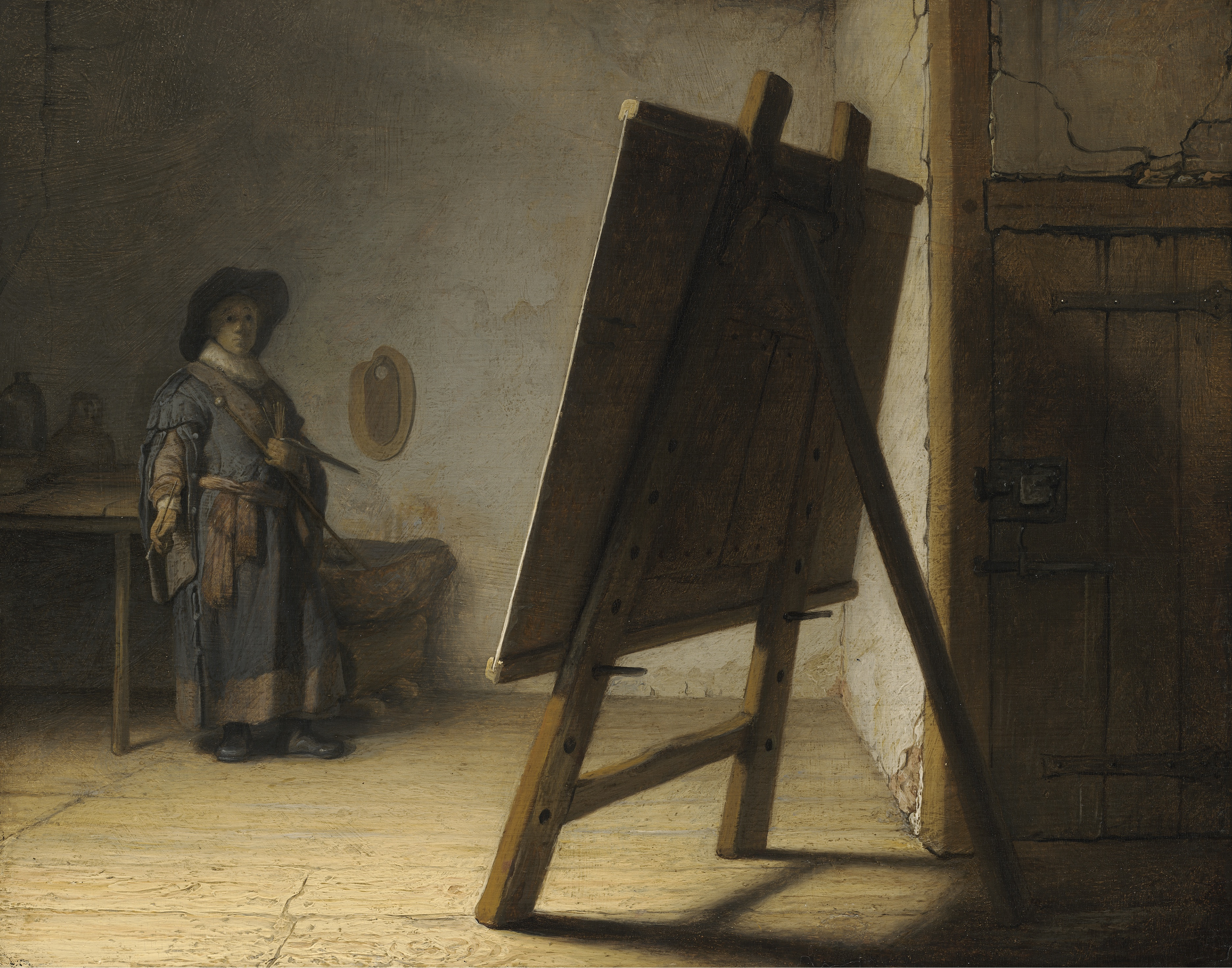
Artist in His Studio (1628) at the Museum of Fine Arts in Boston

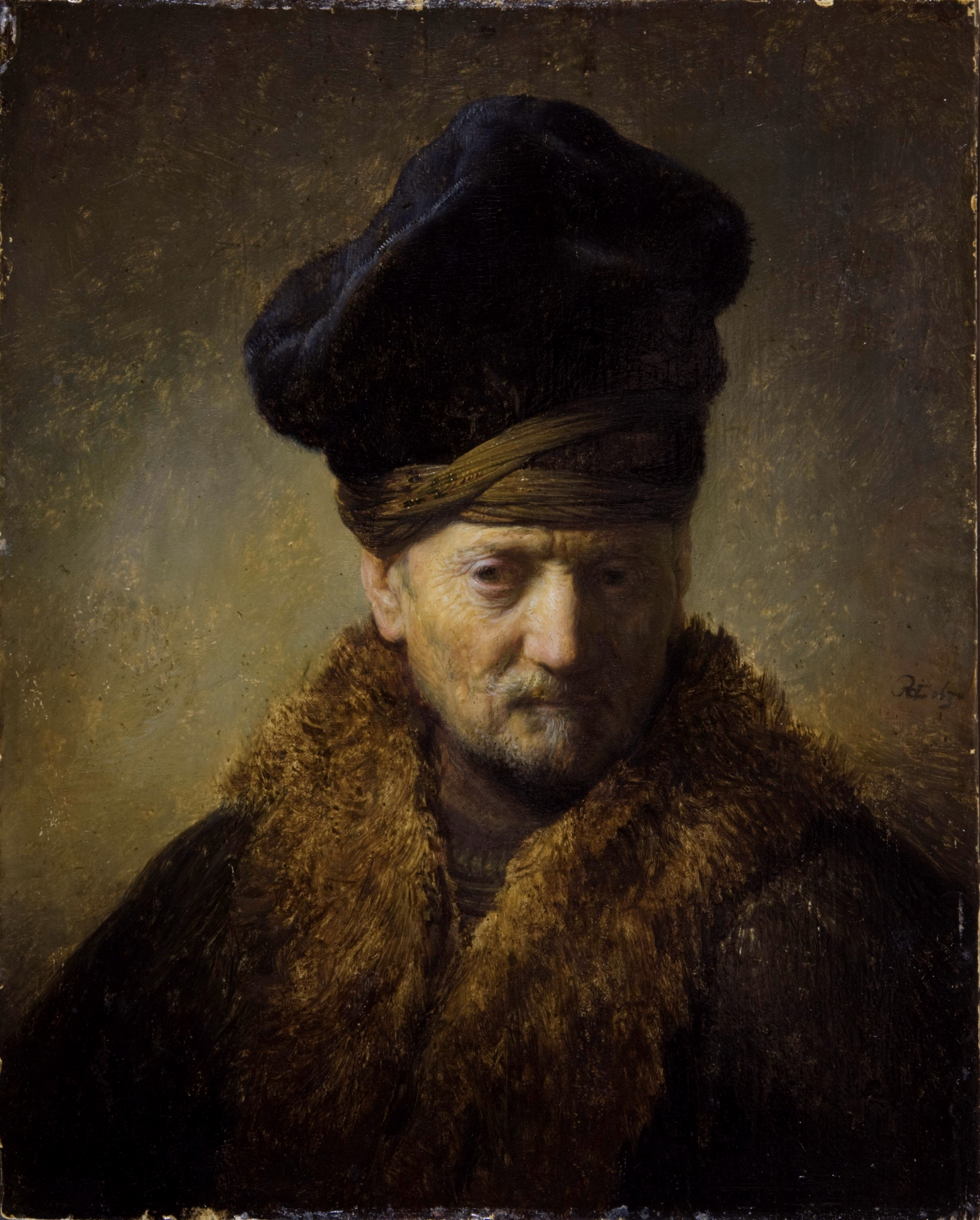
Bust of an old man with a fur hat (1630), a painting of Rembrandt's father

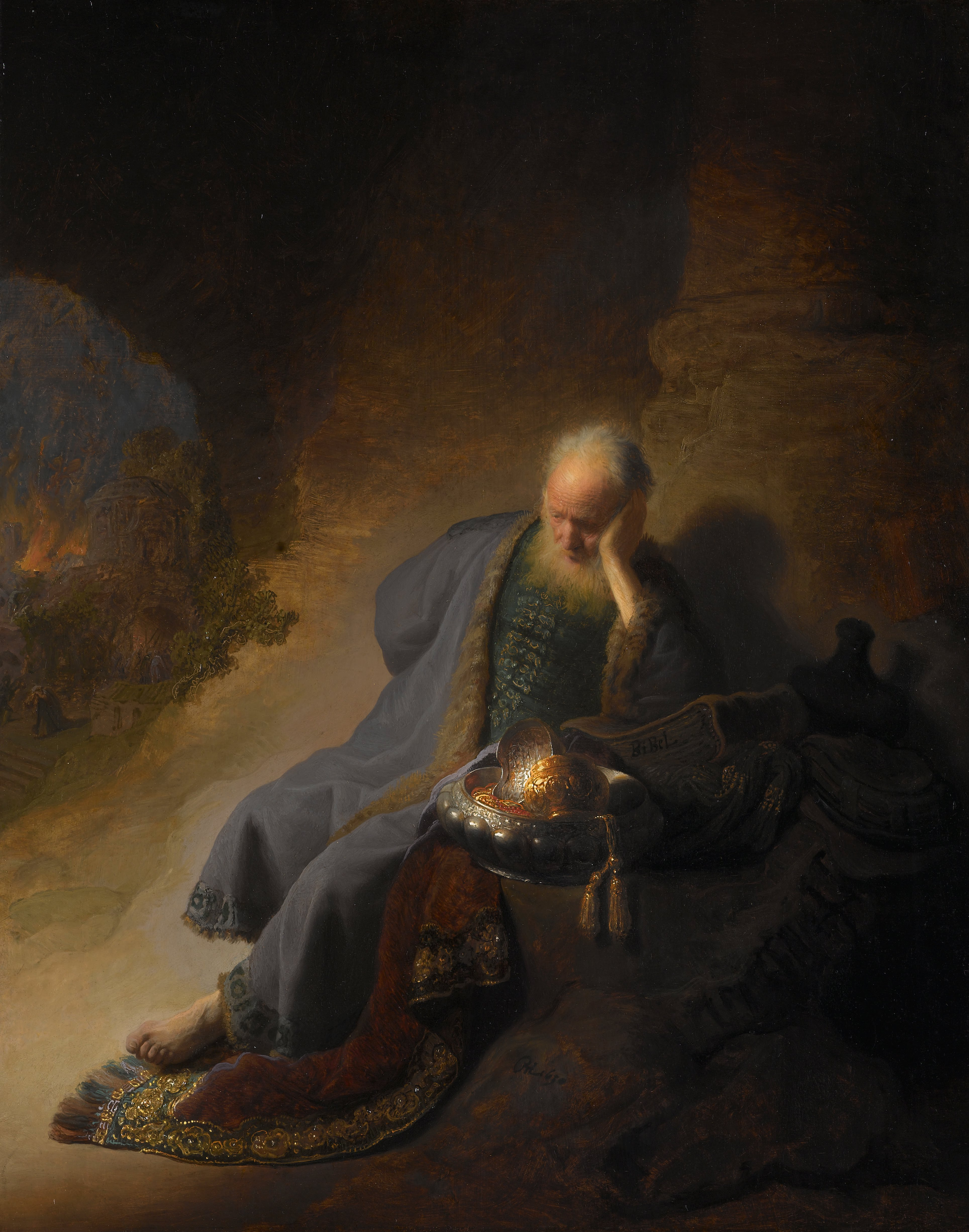
Jeremiah Lamenting the Destruction of Jerusalem (c. 1630)

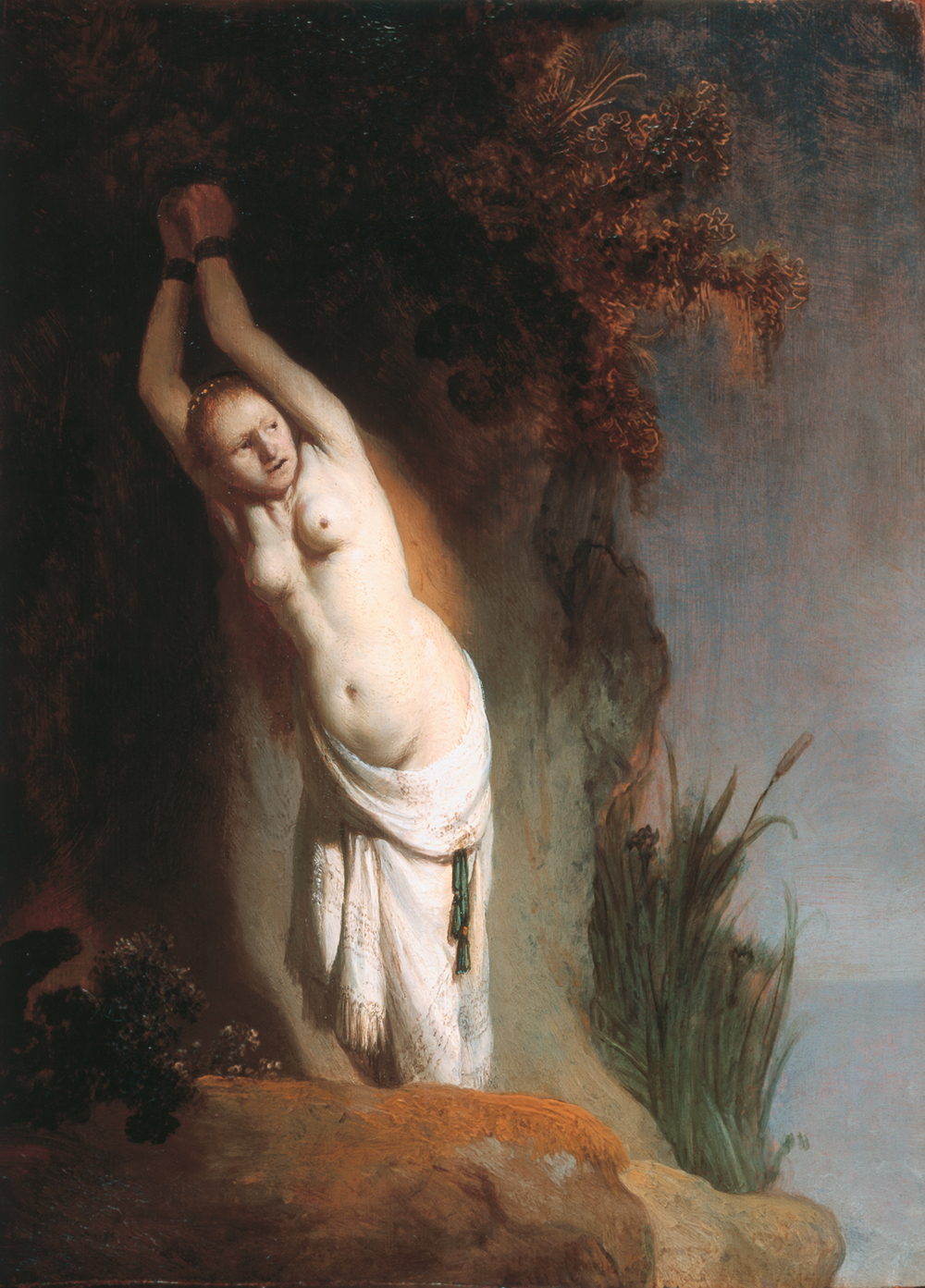
Andromeda (c. 1630)

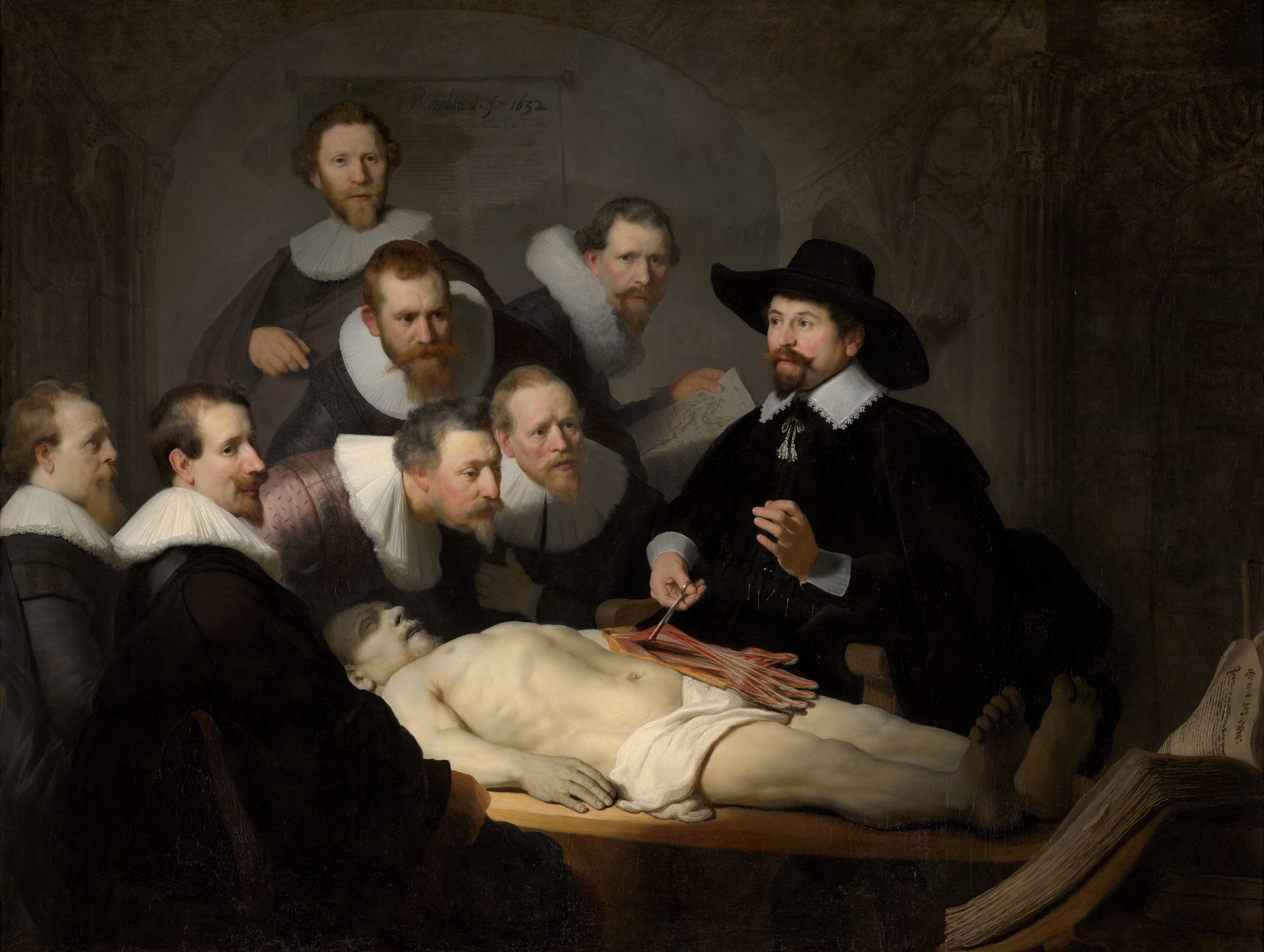
Anatomy Lesson of Dr. Nicolaes Tulp (c. 1632)

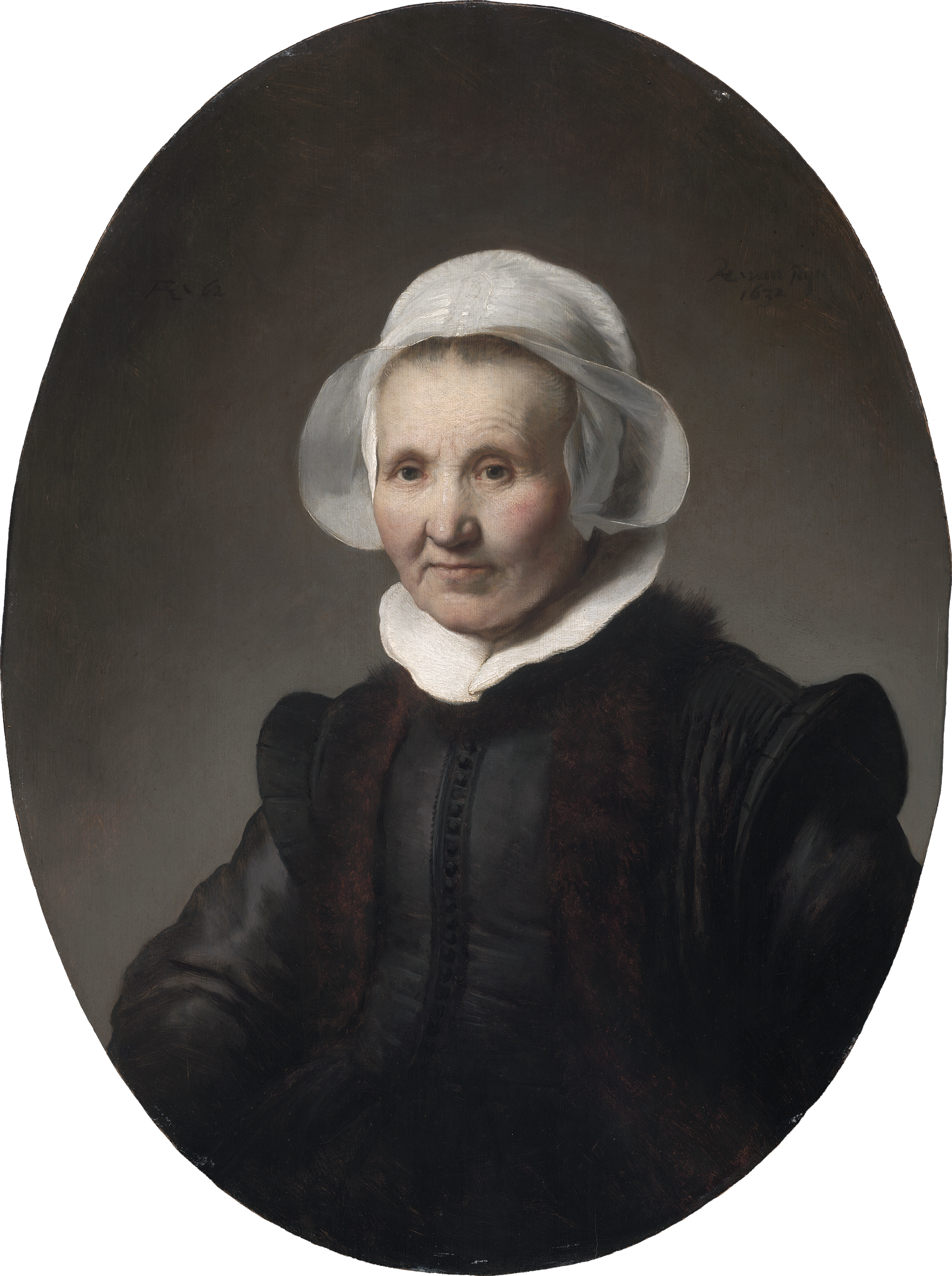
Portrait of Aeltje Uylenburgh (1632) at the Museum of Fine Arts in Boston

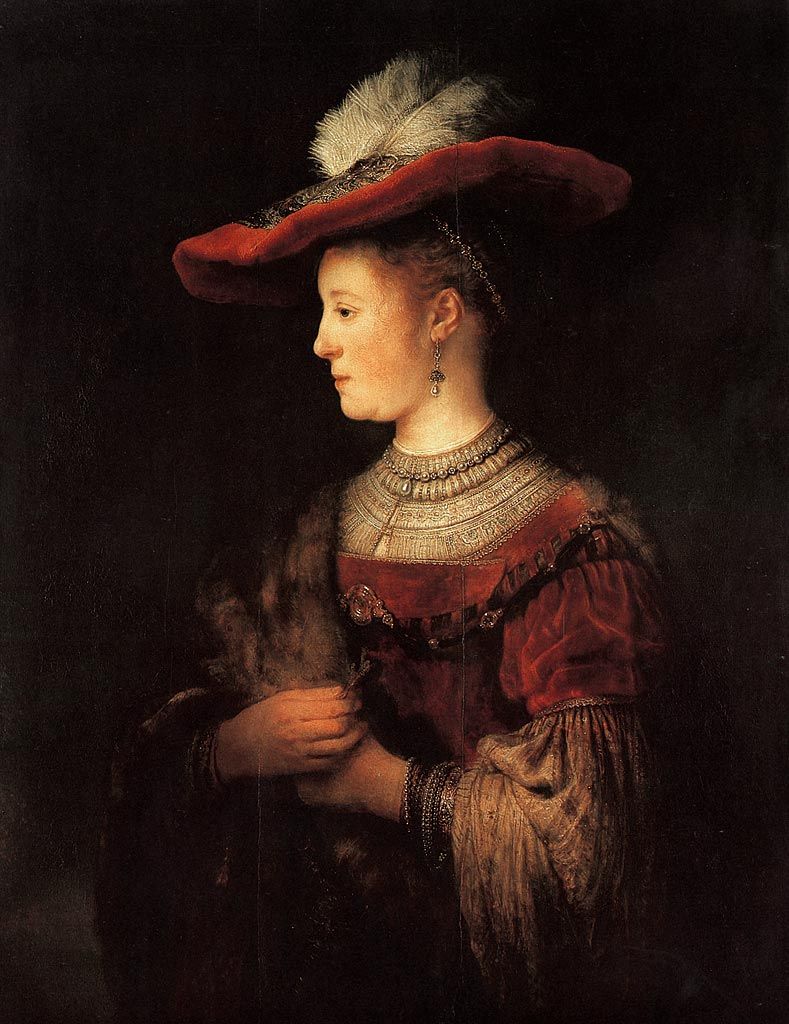
Portrait of Saskia van Uylenburgh (c. 1633–34)

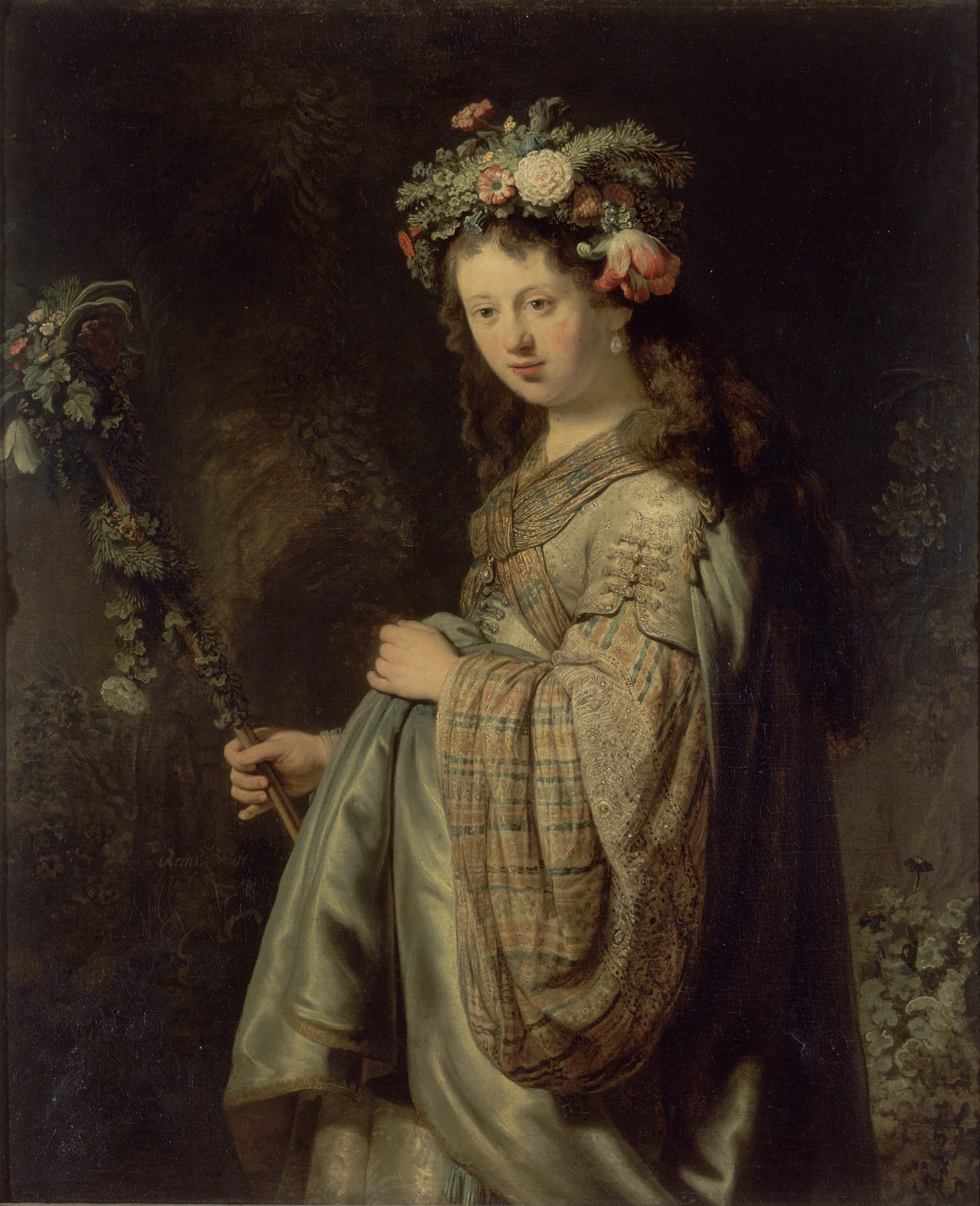
Flora (1634), Hermitage Museum, Saint Petersburg, Russia

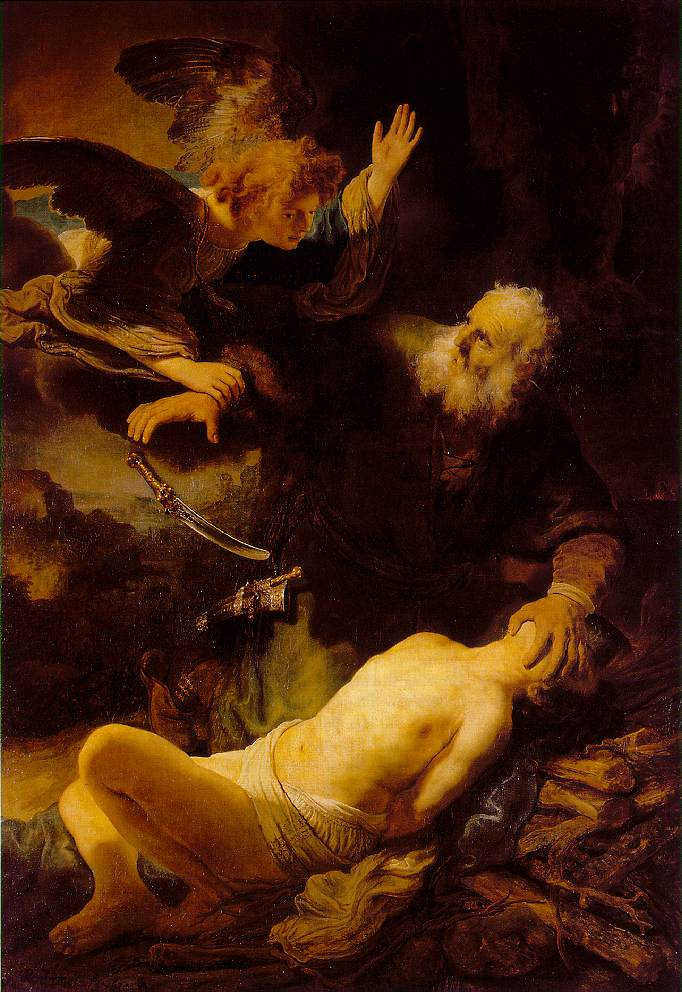
Sacrifice of Isaac (1634), Hermitage Museum, Saint Petersburg, Russia

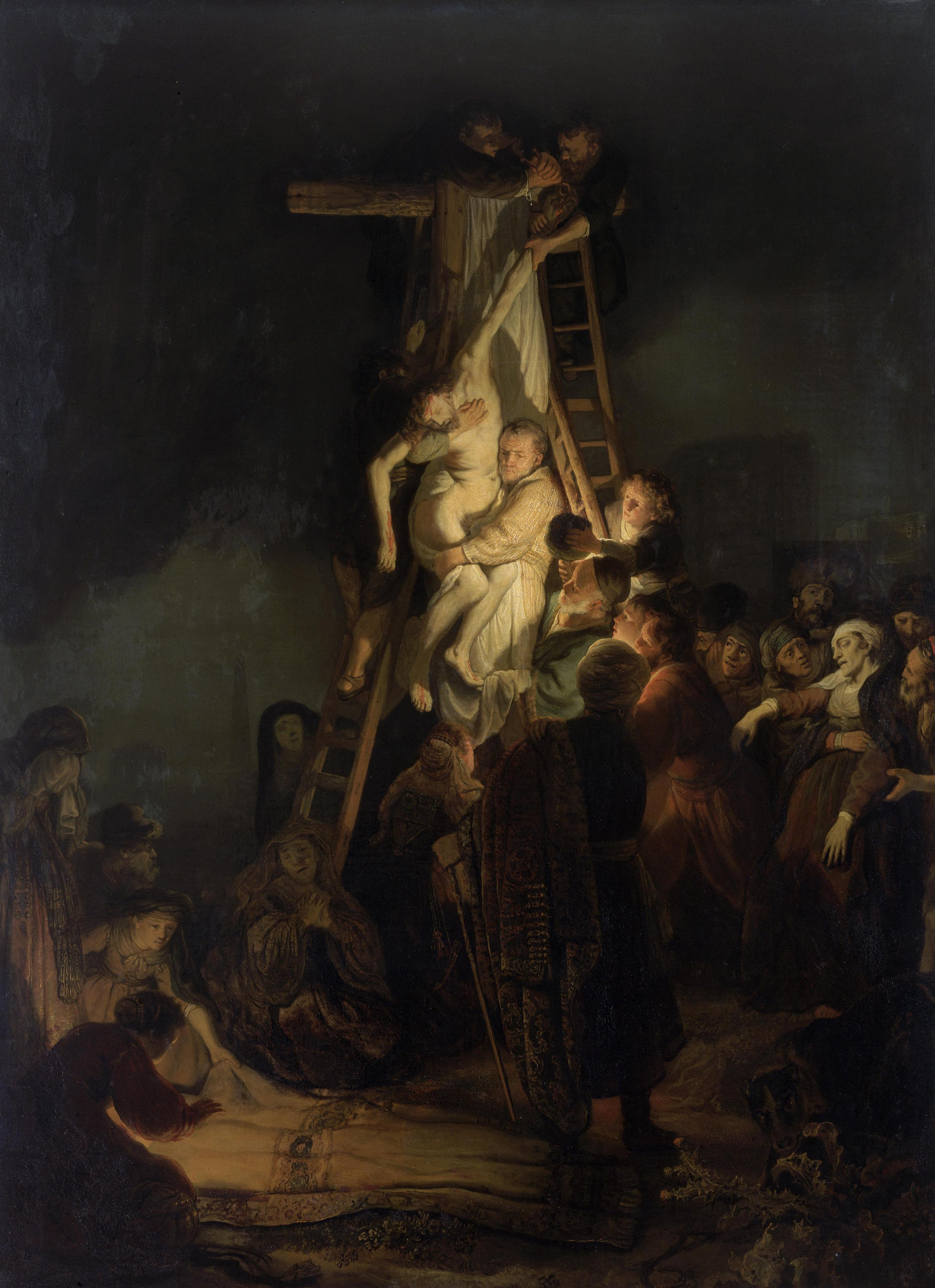
The Descent from the Cross (1634), Hermitage Museum, Saint Petersburg, Russia

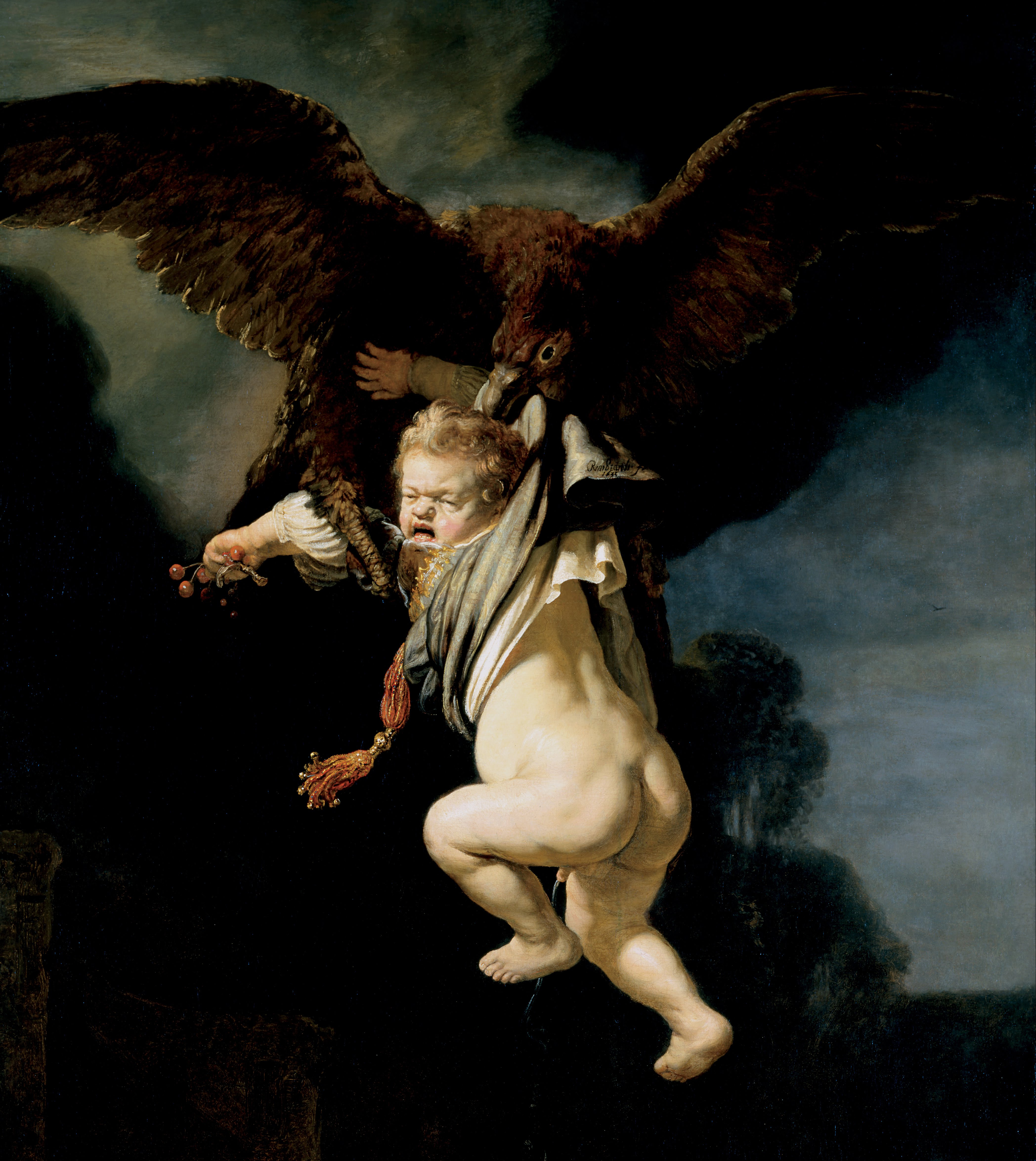
The Rape of Ganymede (1635), Staatliche Kunstsammlungen Dresden

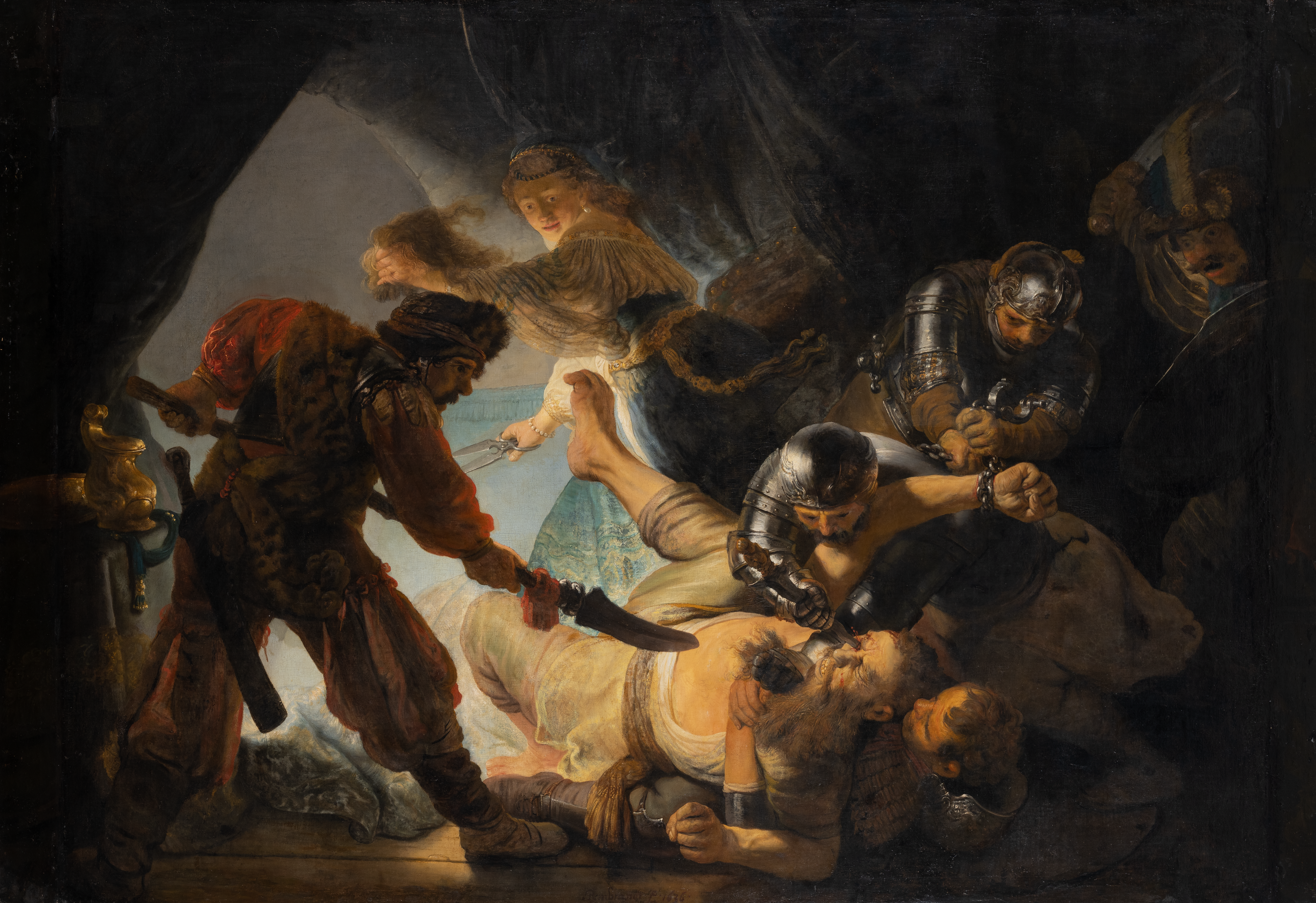
The Blinding of Samson (1636), which Rembrandt gave to Huyghens

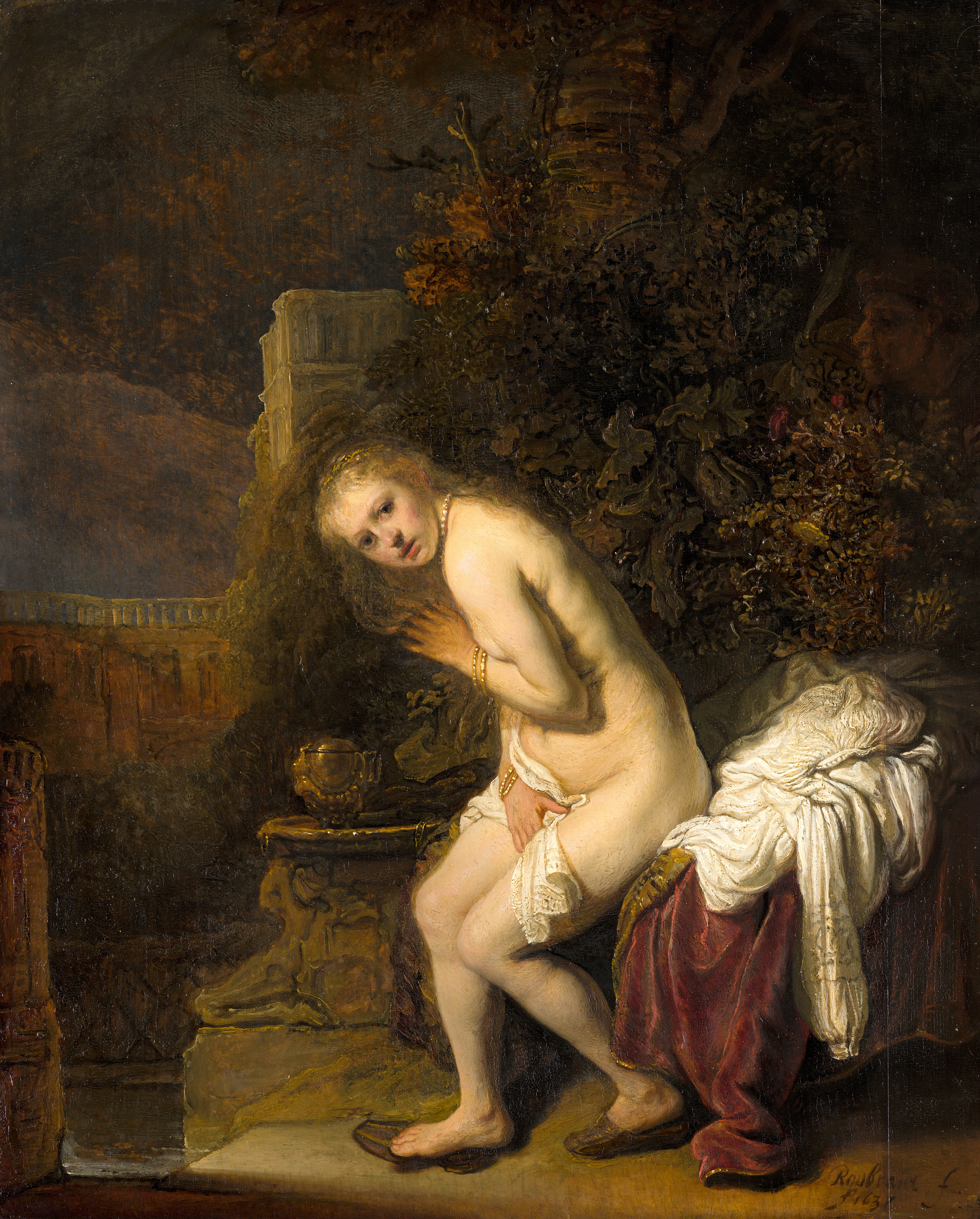
Susanna (1636)

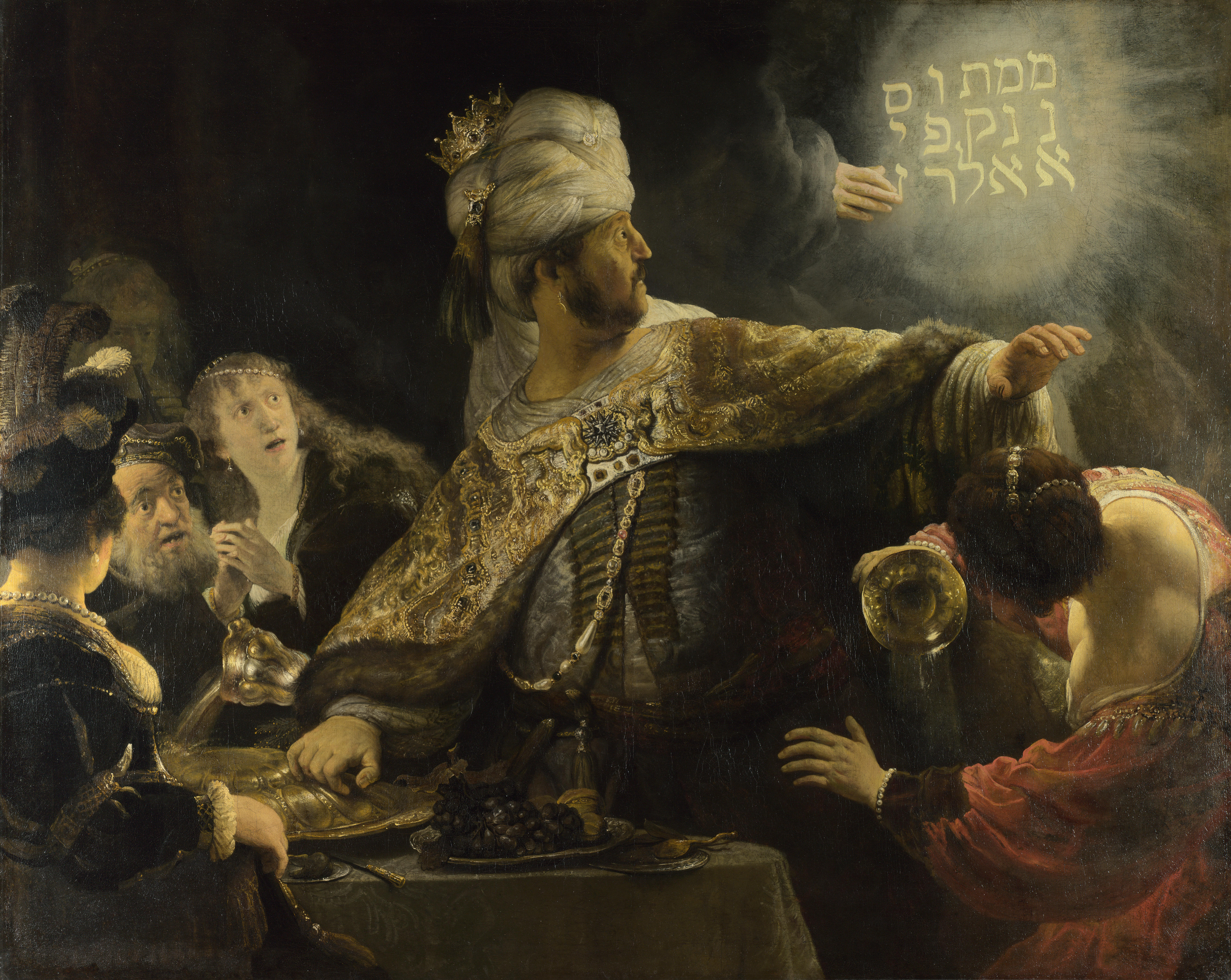
Belshassar's Feast (c. 1636–38)

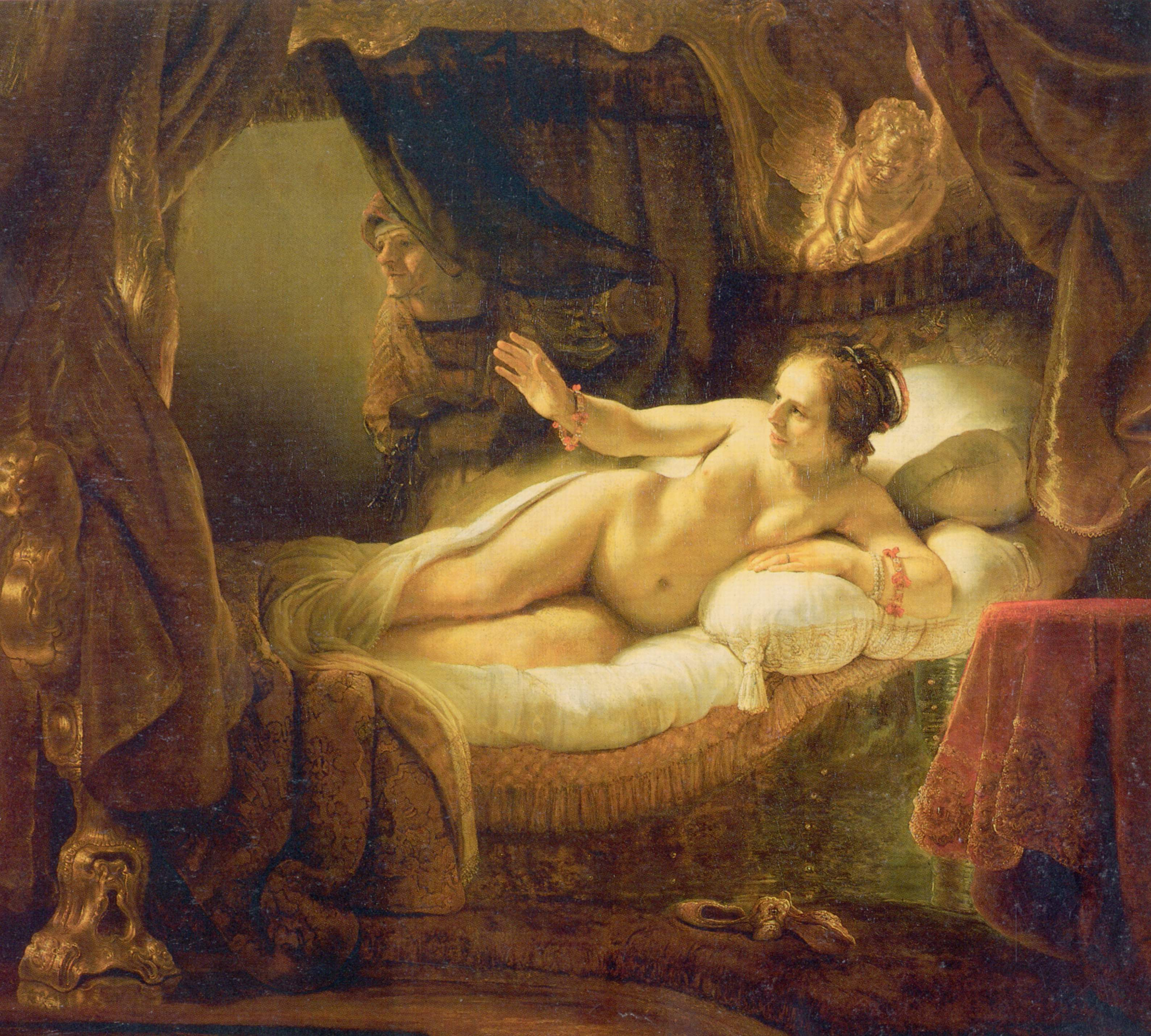
Danaë (c. 1636–43), Hermitage Museum, Saint Petersburg, Russia

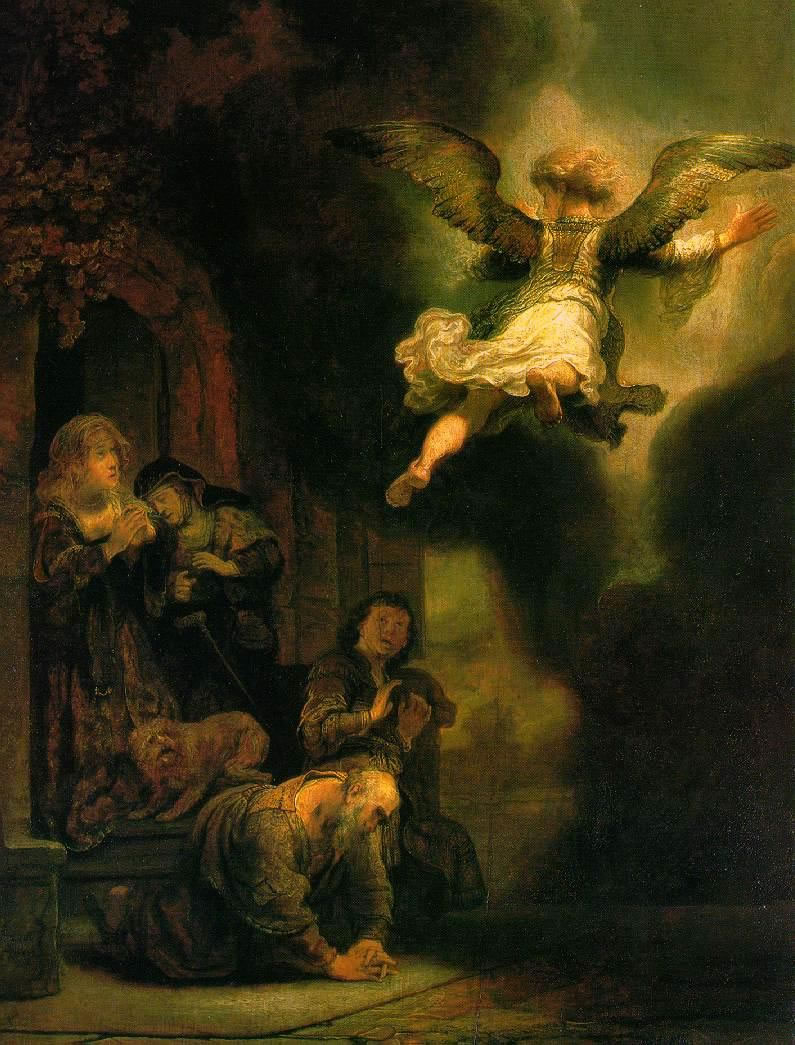
The Archangel Raphael Leaving Tobias' Family (1637), Louvre

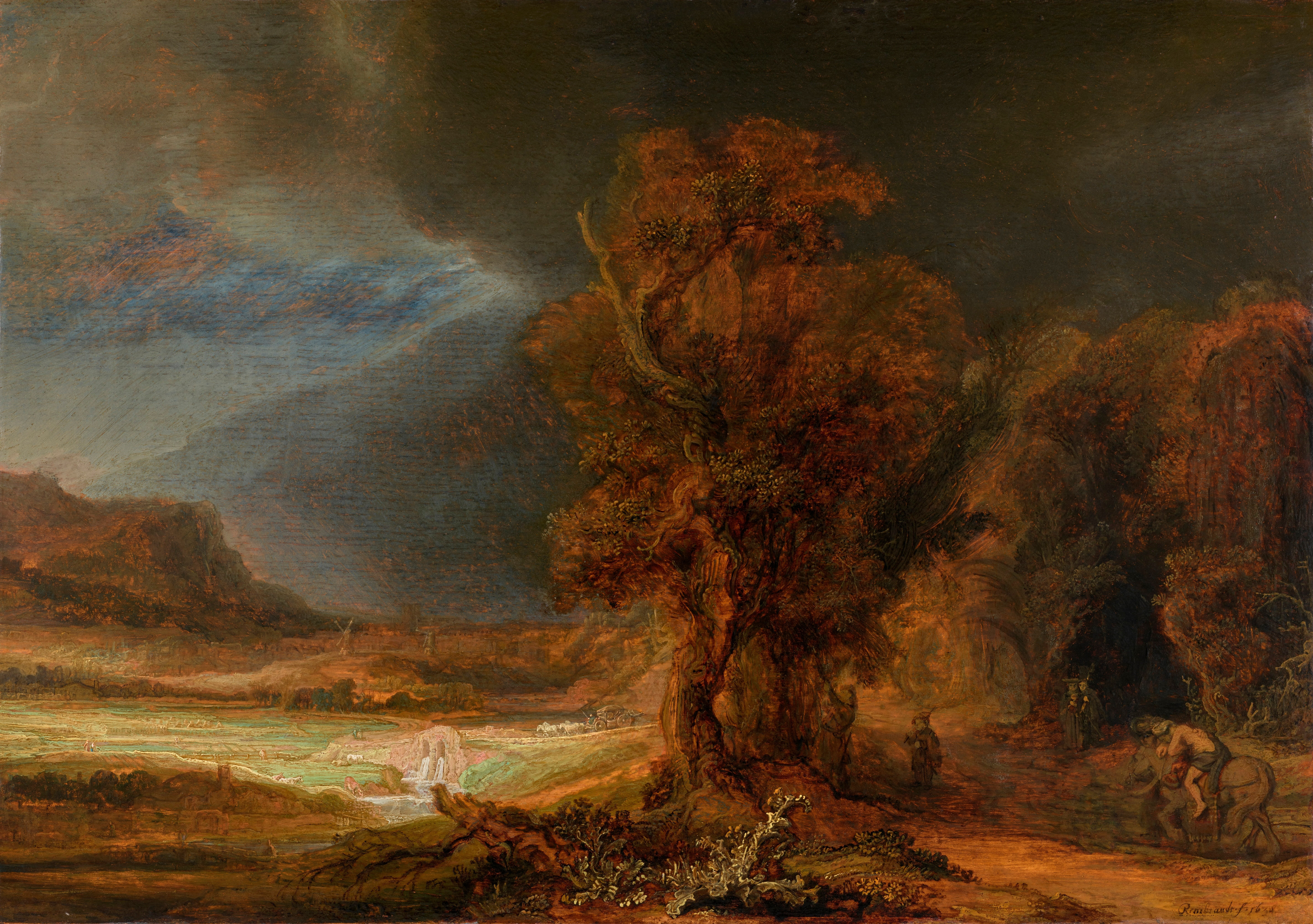
The Landscape with Good Samaritan (1638), Czartoryski Museum, Kraków, Poland

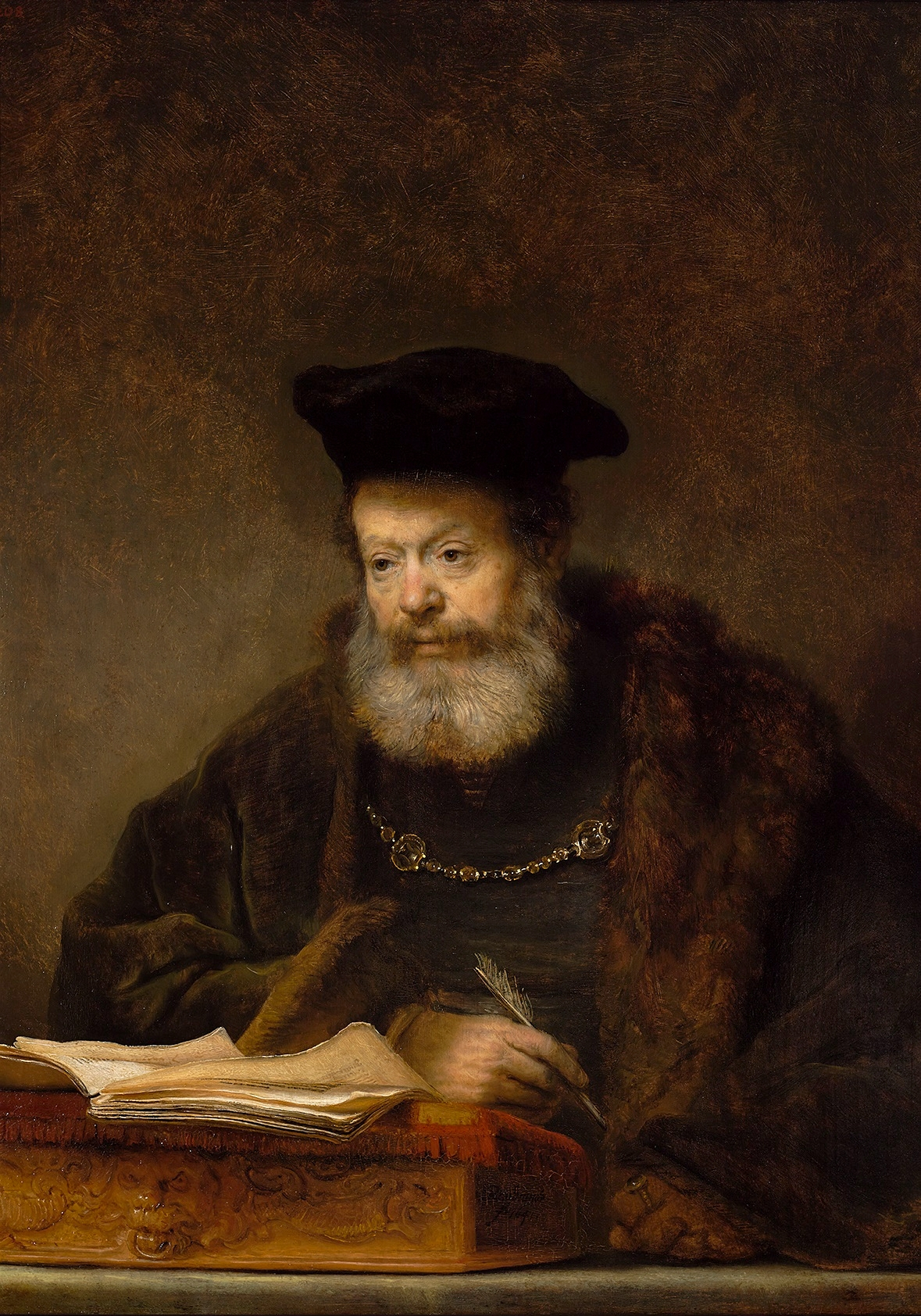
Scholar at his Writing Table (1641), Royal Castle, Warsaw

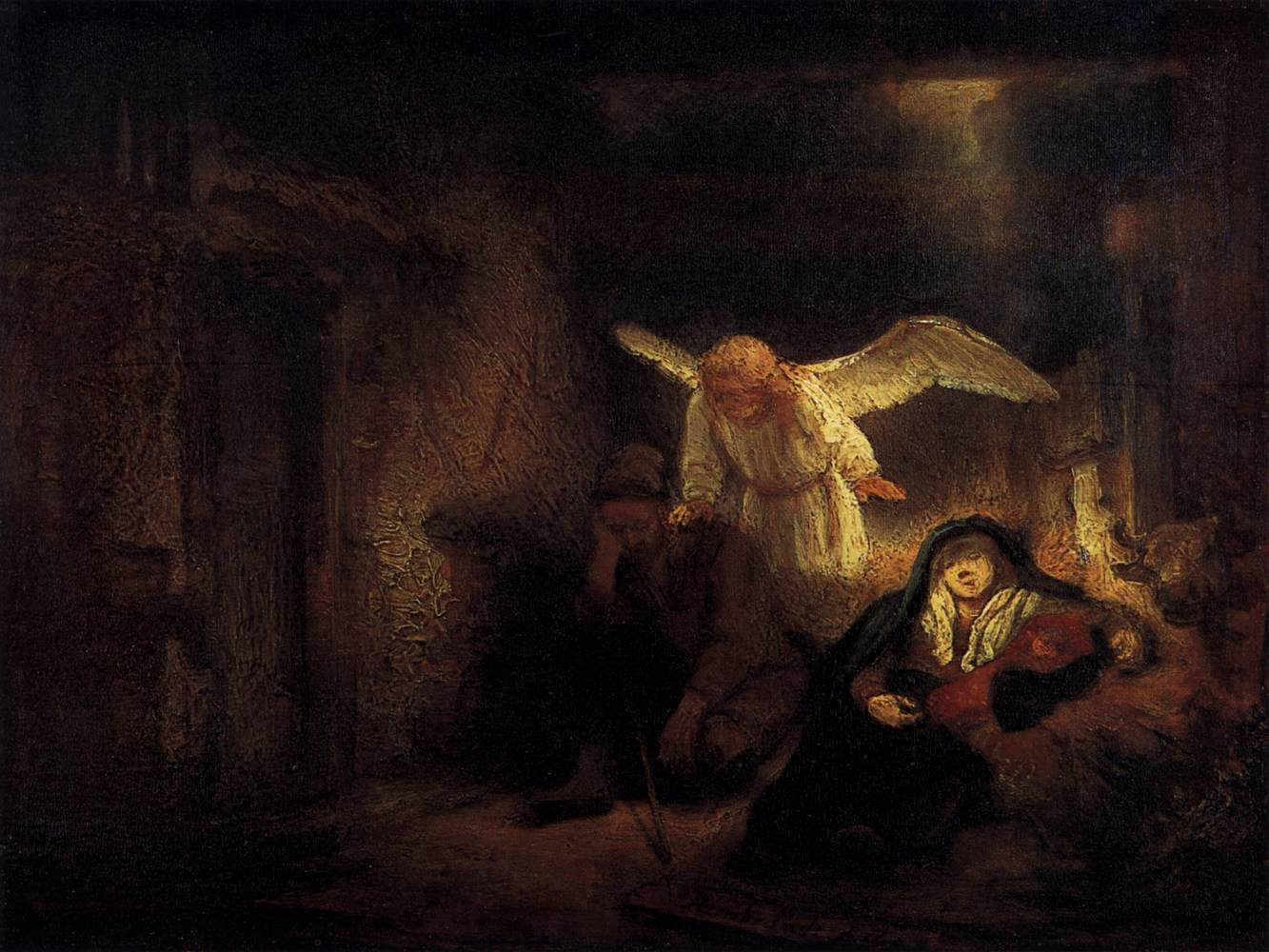
Joseph's Dream (c. 1645)

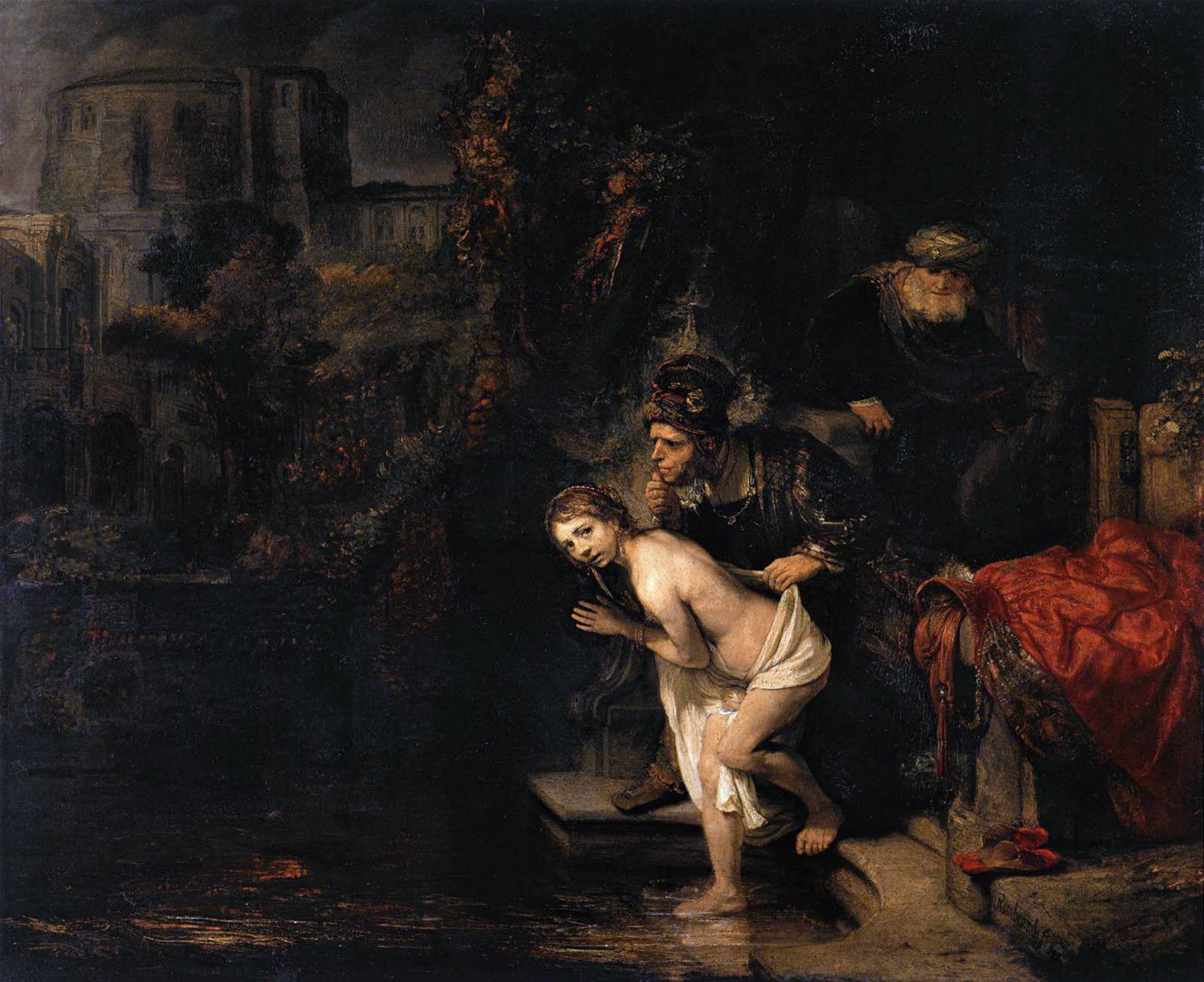
Susanna and the Elders (1647)

The Mill (1648)

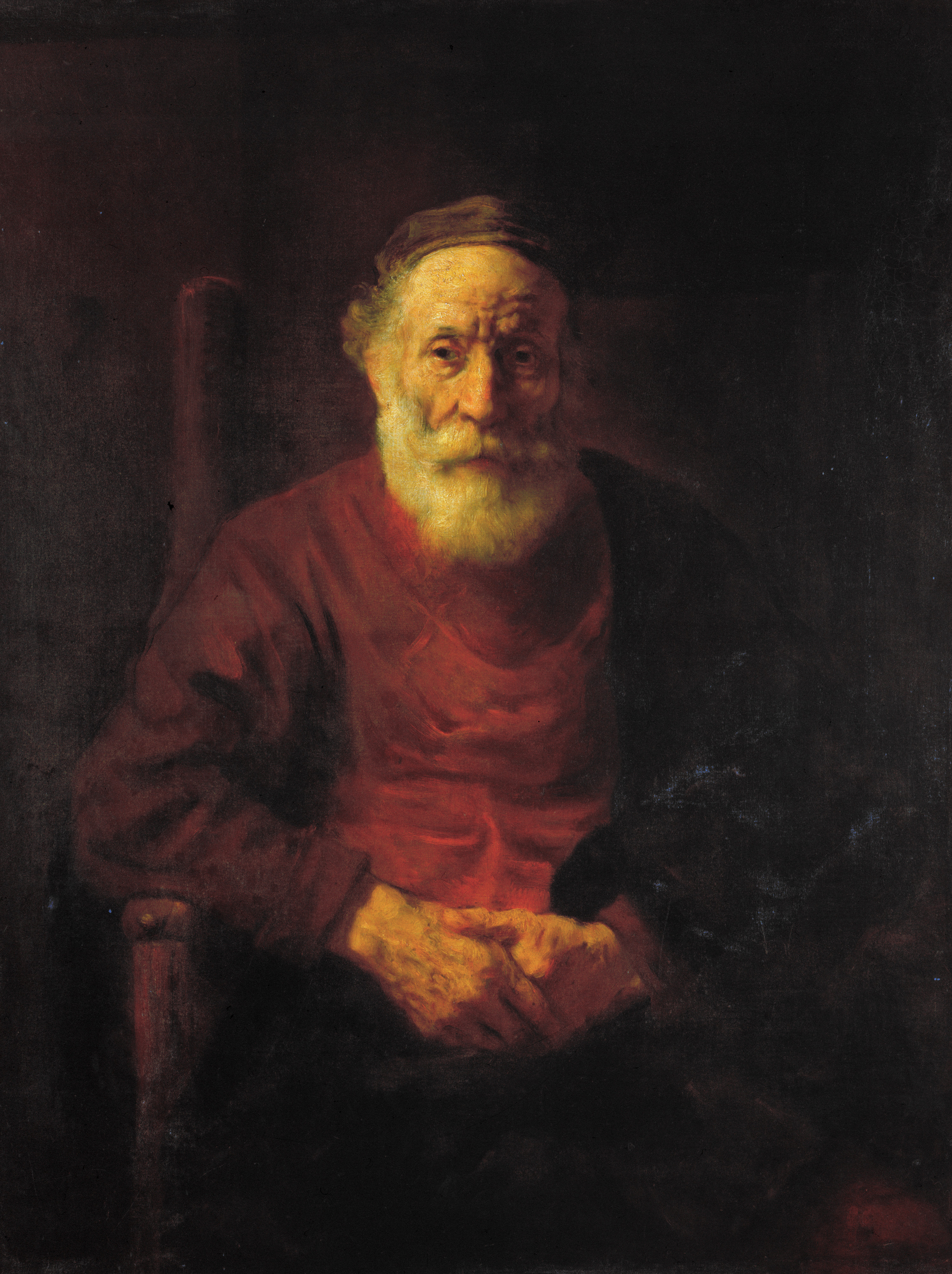
An Old Man in Red (c. 1652–54), Hermitage Museum, Saint Petersburg, Russia

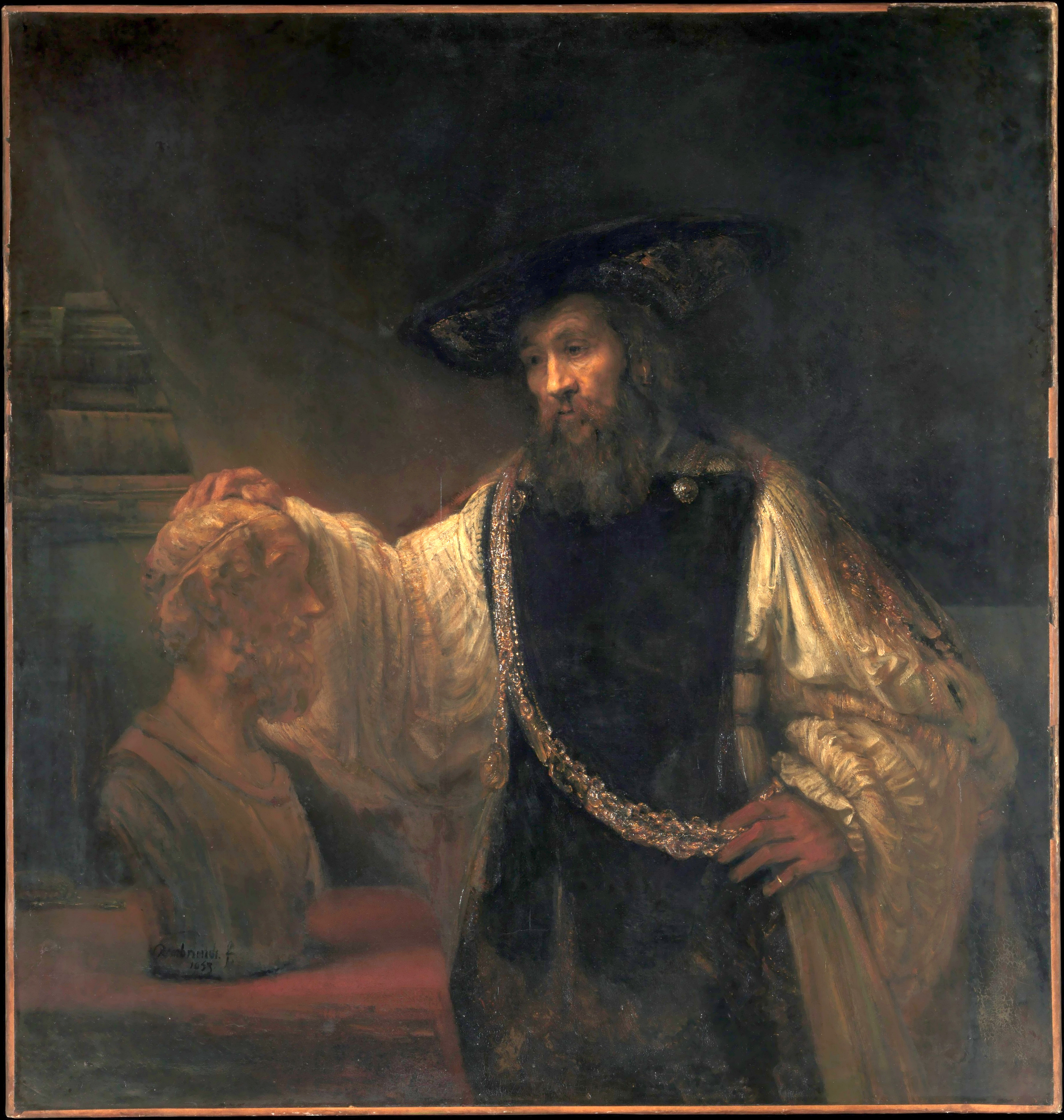
Aristotle with a Bust of Homer (1653), Metropolitan Museum of Art, New York

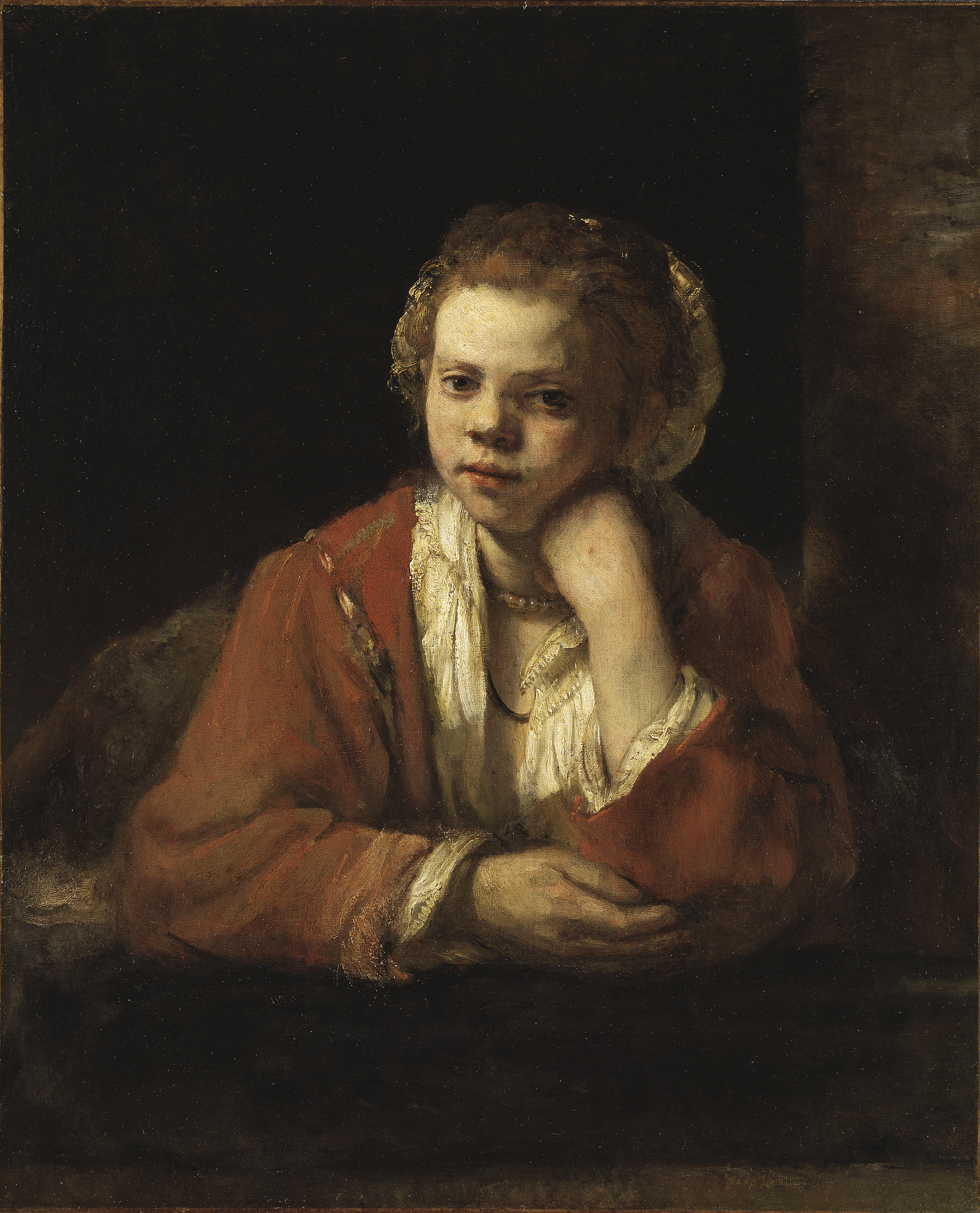
Young Girl at the Window (1654), Nationalmuseum, Stockholm

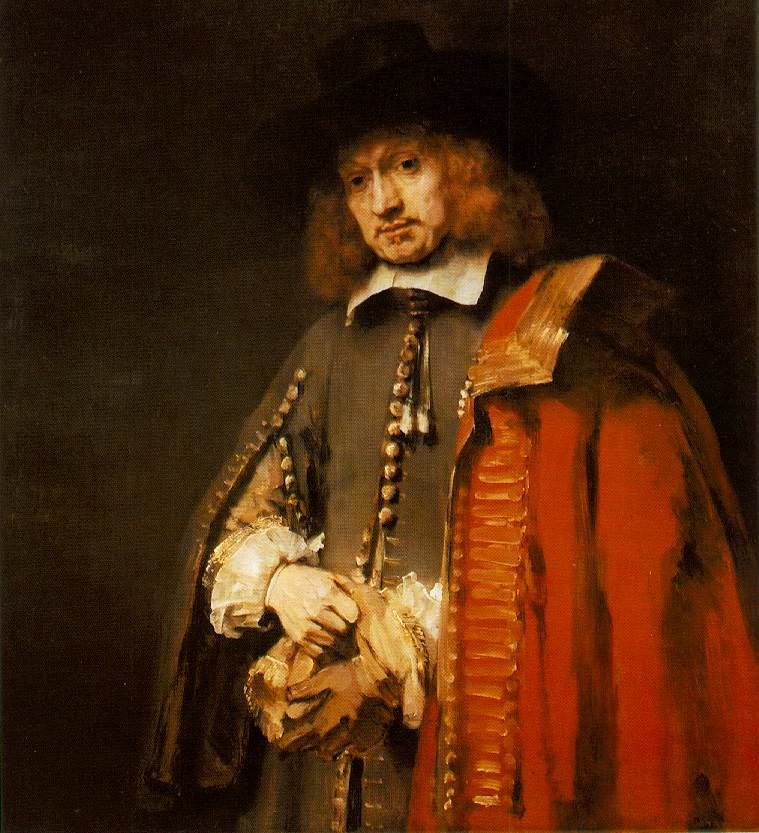
Portrait of Jan Six, a painting of a wealthy friend of Rembrandt (1654)

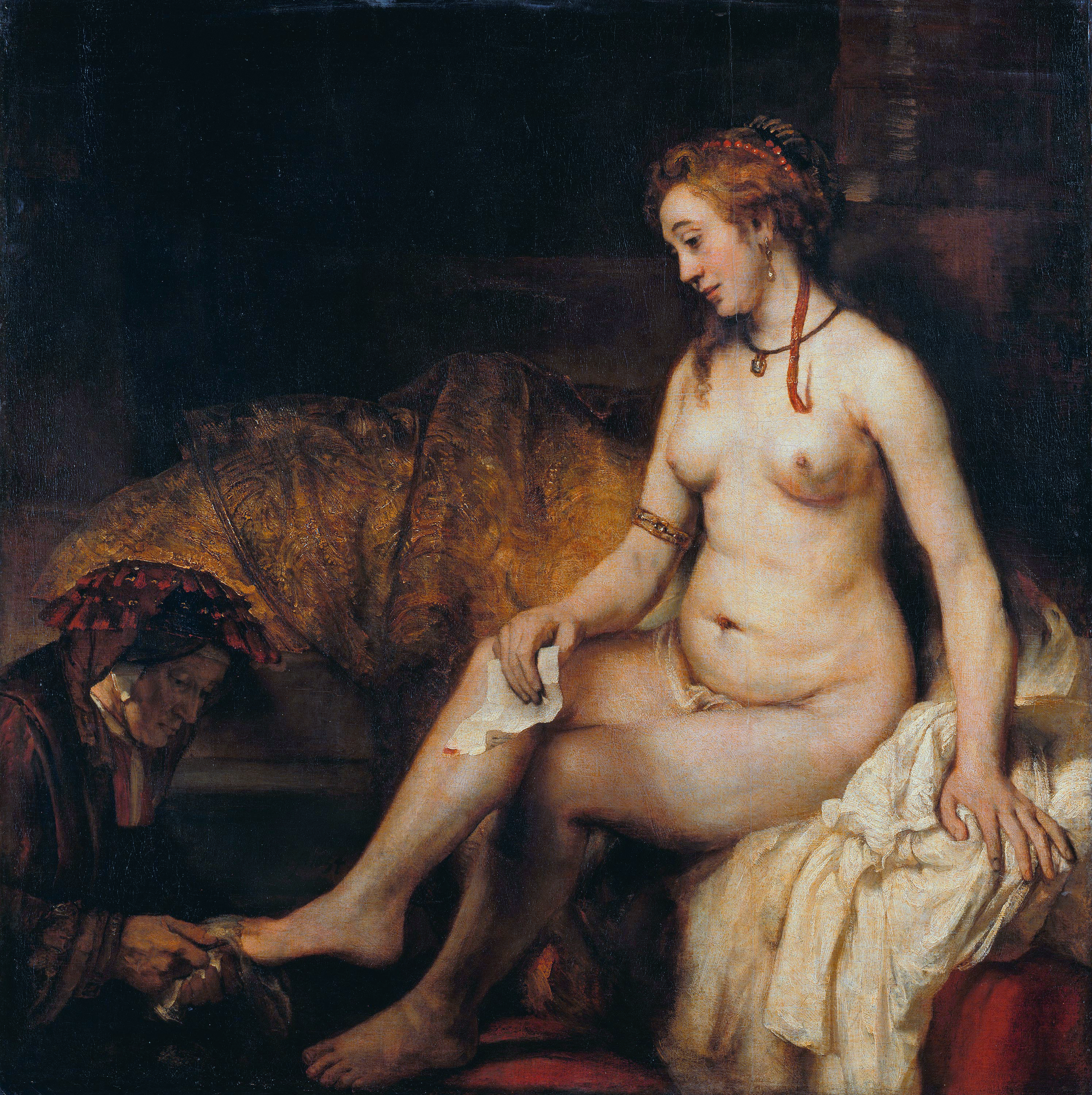
Bathsheba at Her Bath, modelled by Hendrickje (1654)

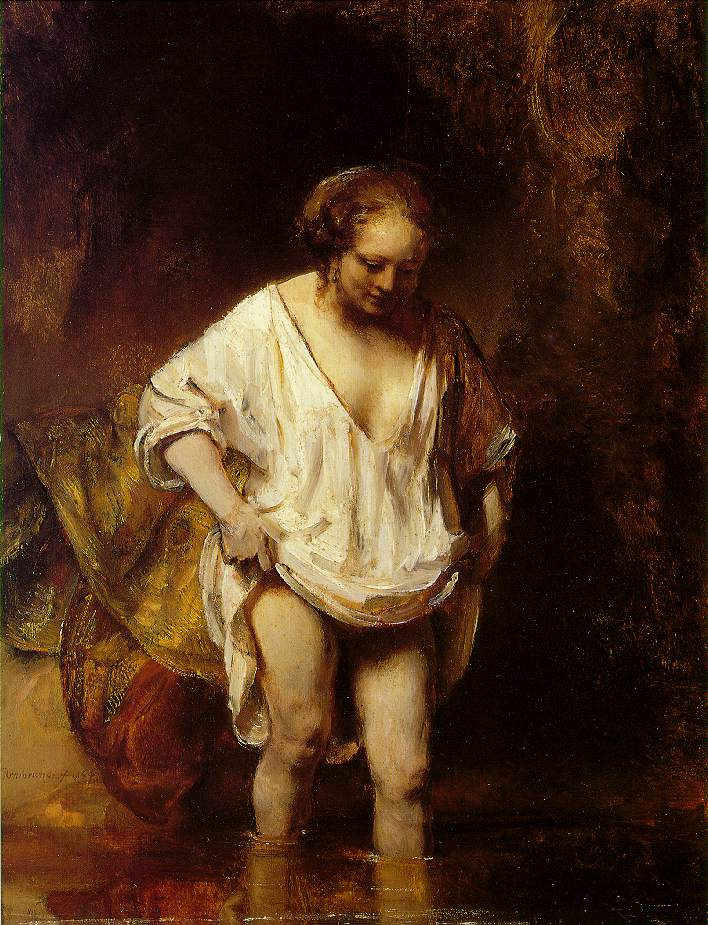
A Woman Bathing in a Stream, modelled by Hendrickje (1654)

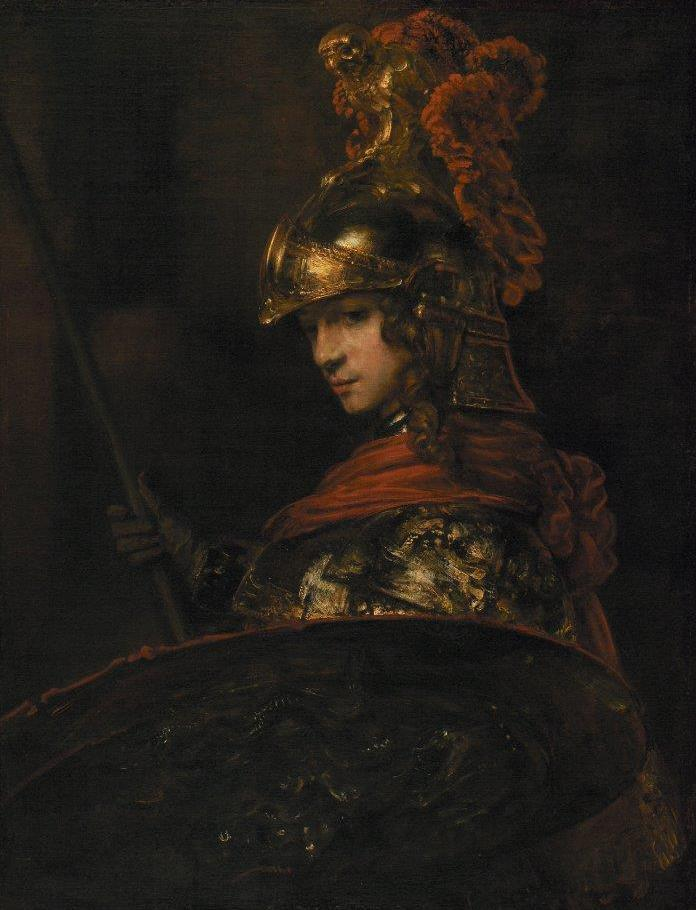
Pallas Athene (c. 1655)

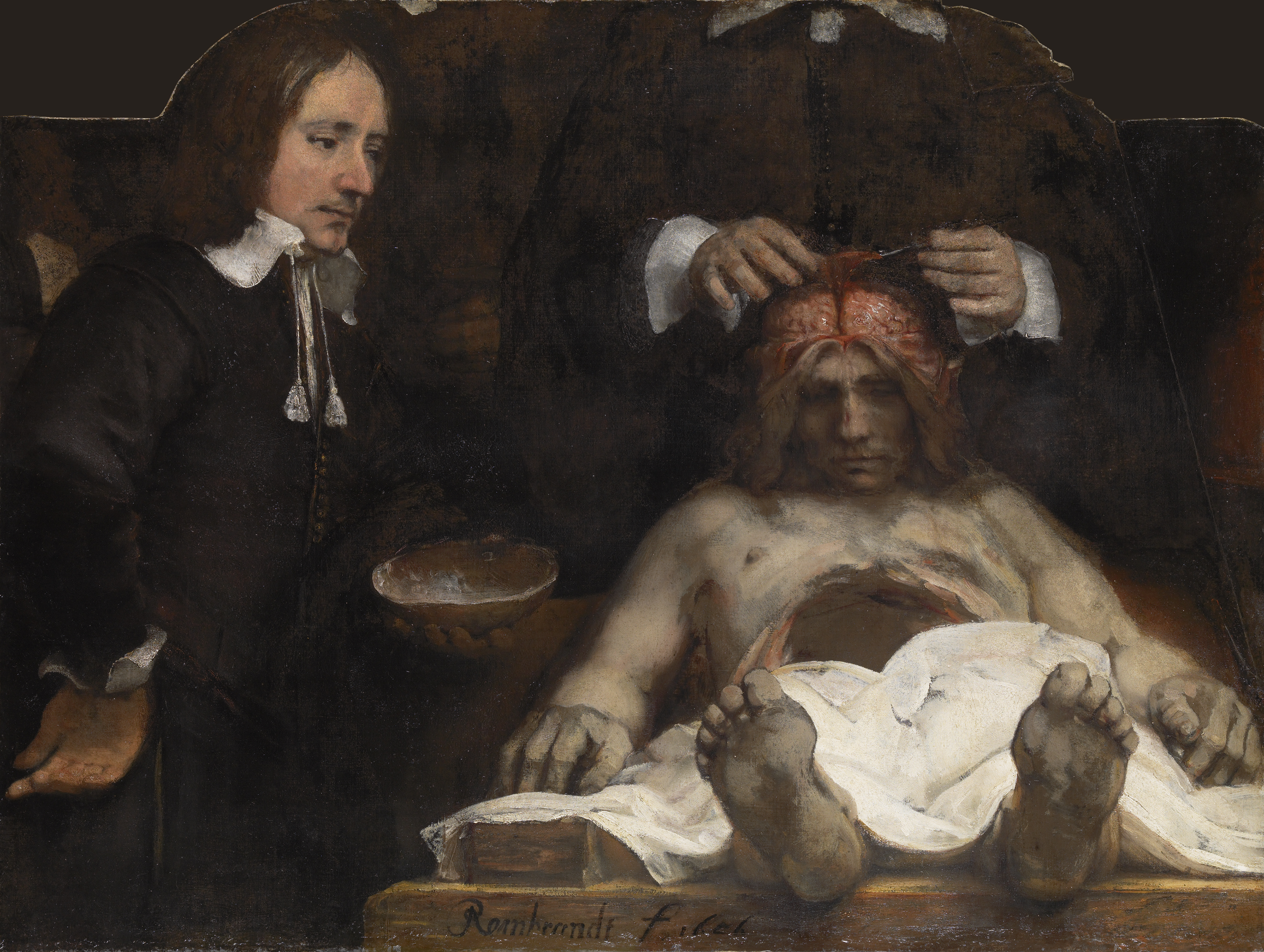
The Anatomy Lesson of Dr. Deijman (1656)

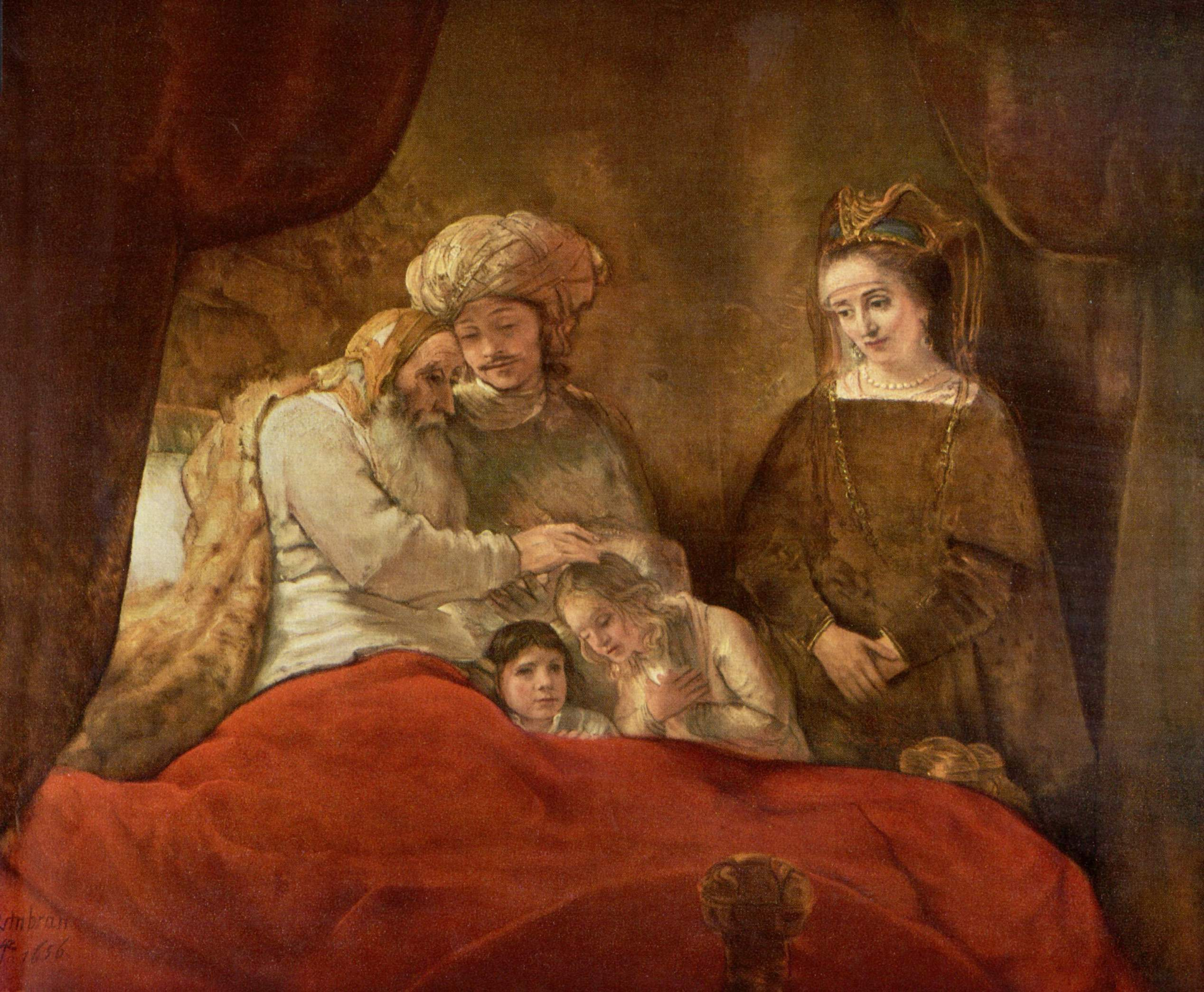
Jacob Blessing the Sons of Joseph (1656)

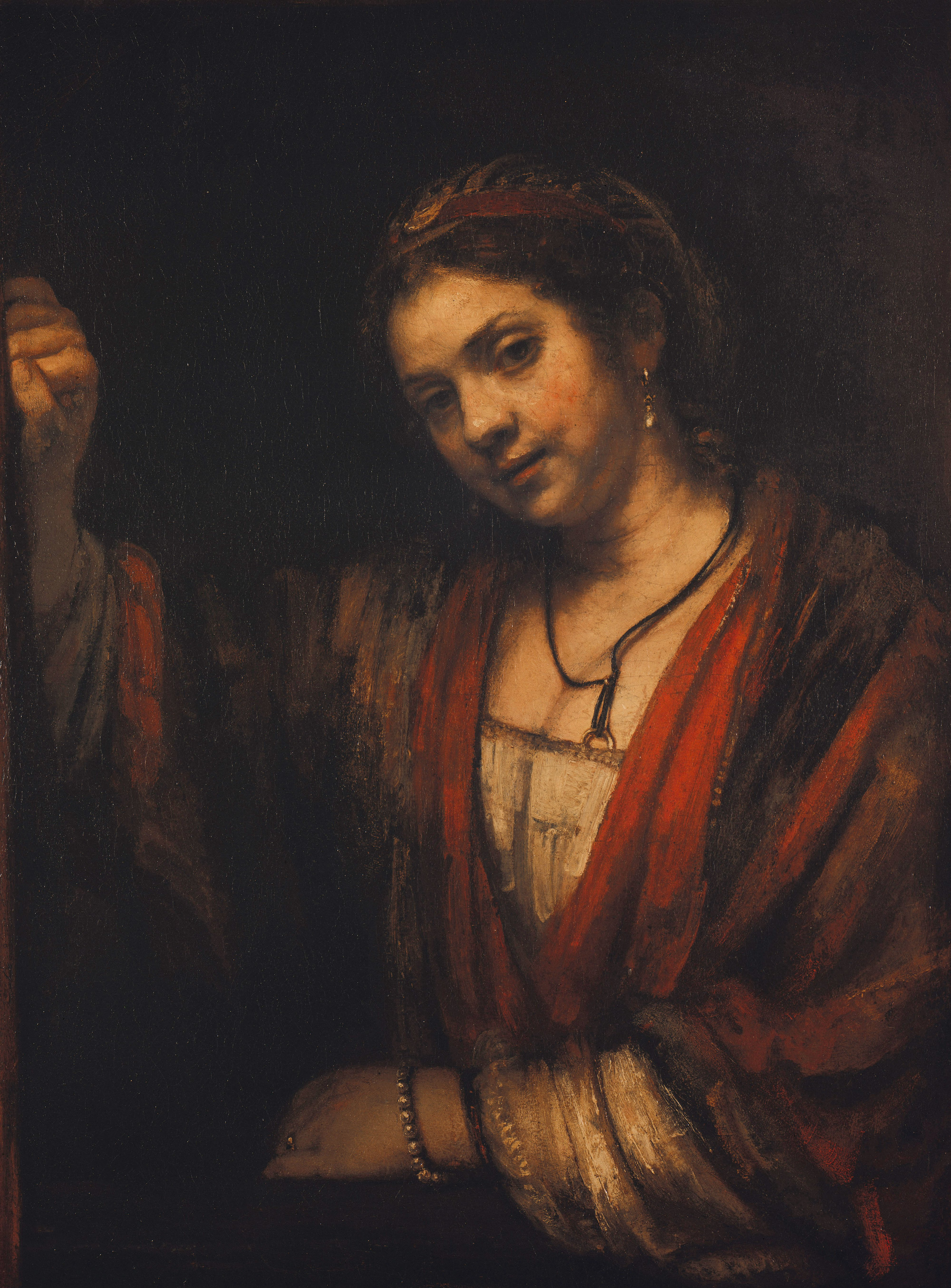
Woman in a Doorway (1657–58)

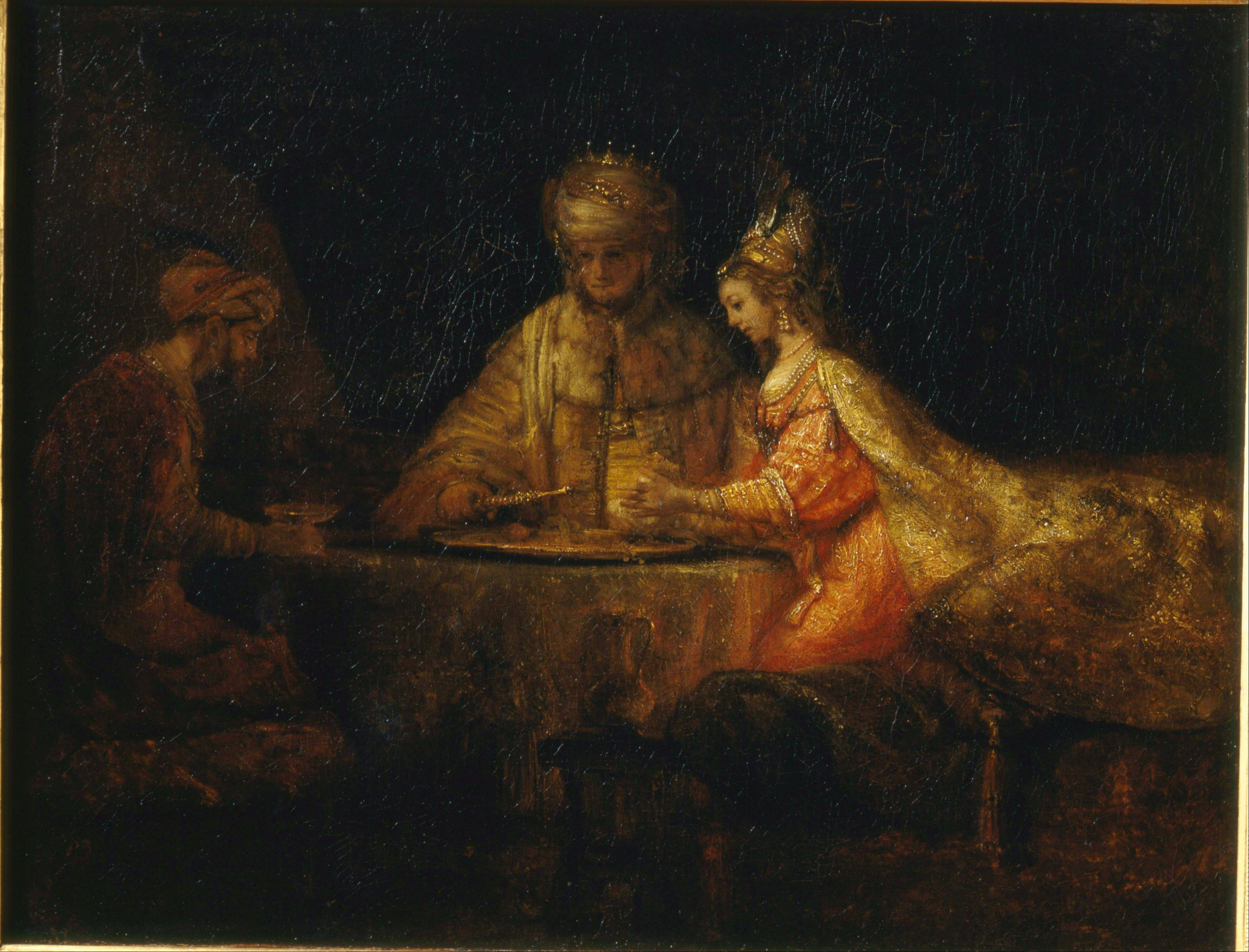
Ahasuerus and Haman at the Feast of Esther (1660), Pushkin Museum, Moscow

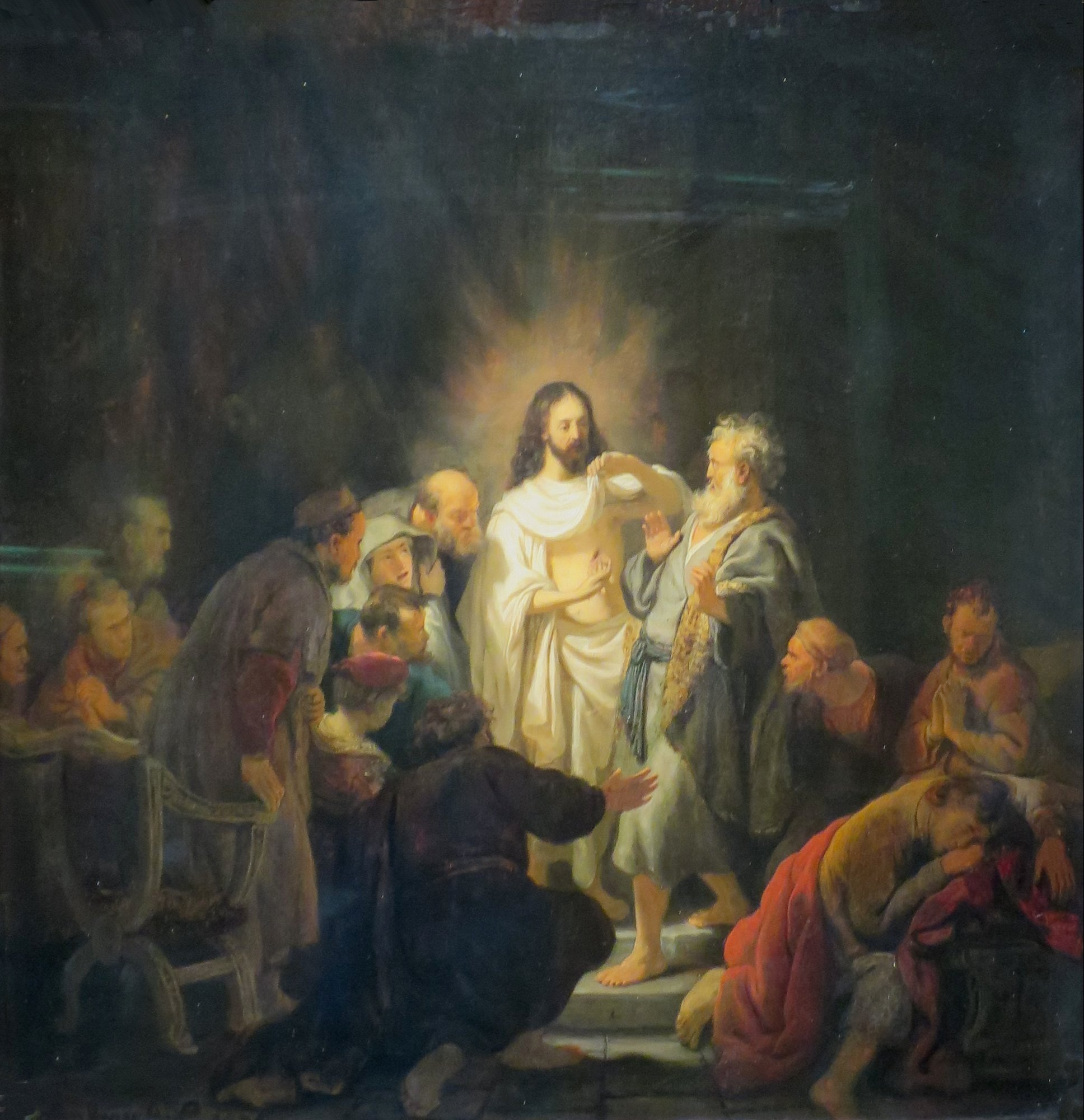
The Incredulity of St Thomas (1660), Pushkin Museum, Moscow

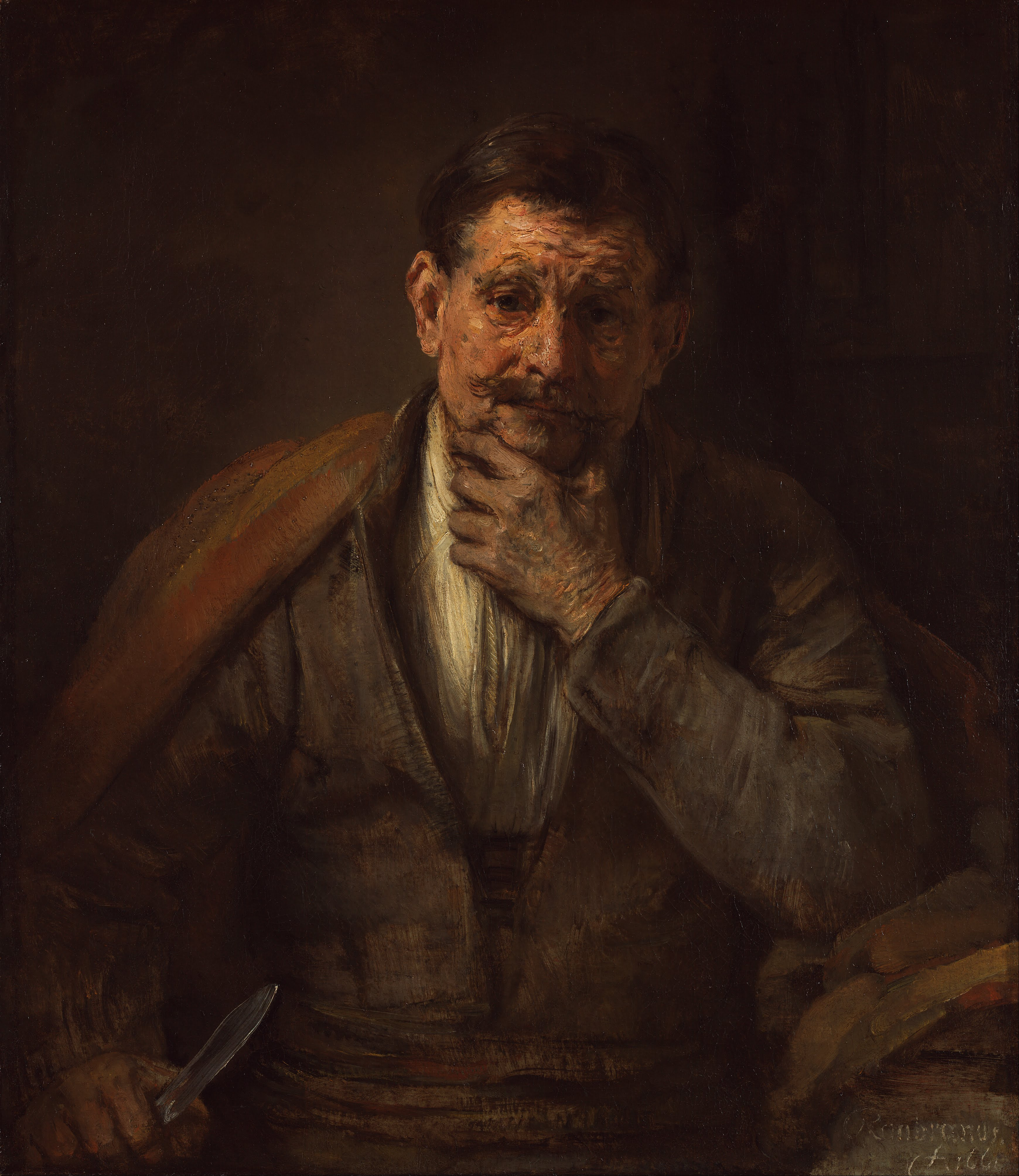
Saint Bartholomew (1661), J. Paul Getty Museum, Malibu

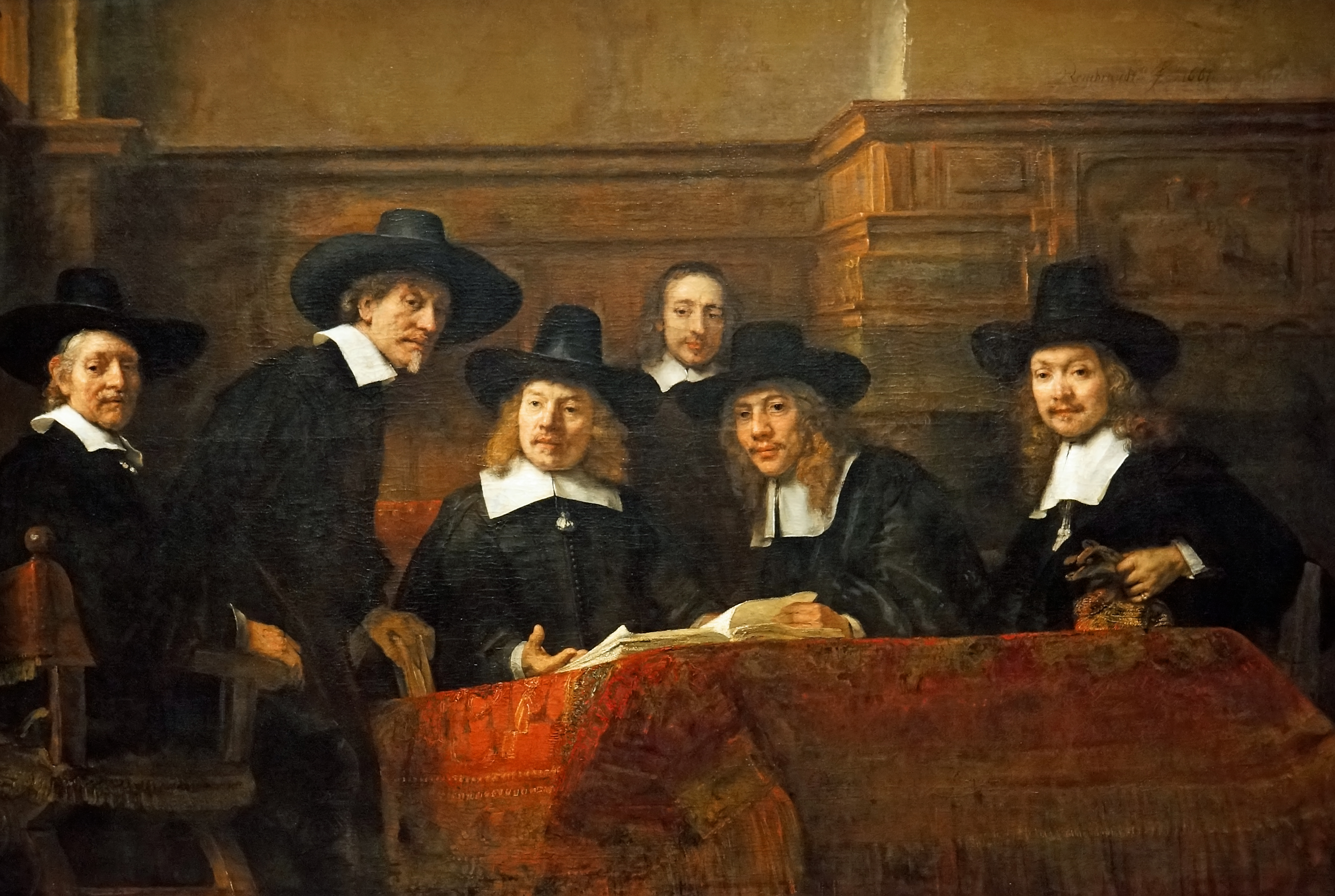
The Syndics of the Drapers' Guild (1662)

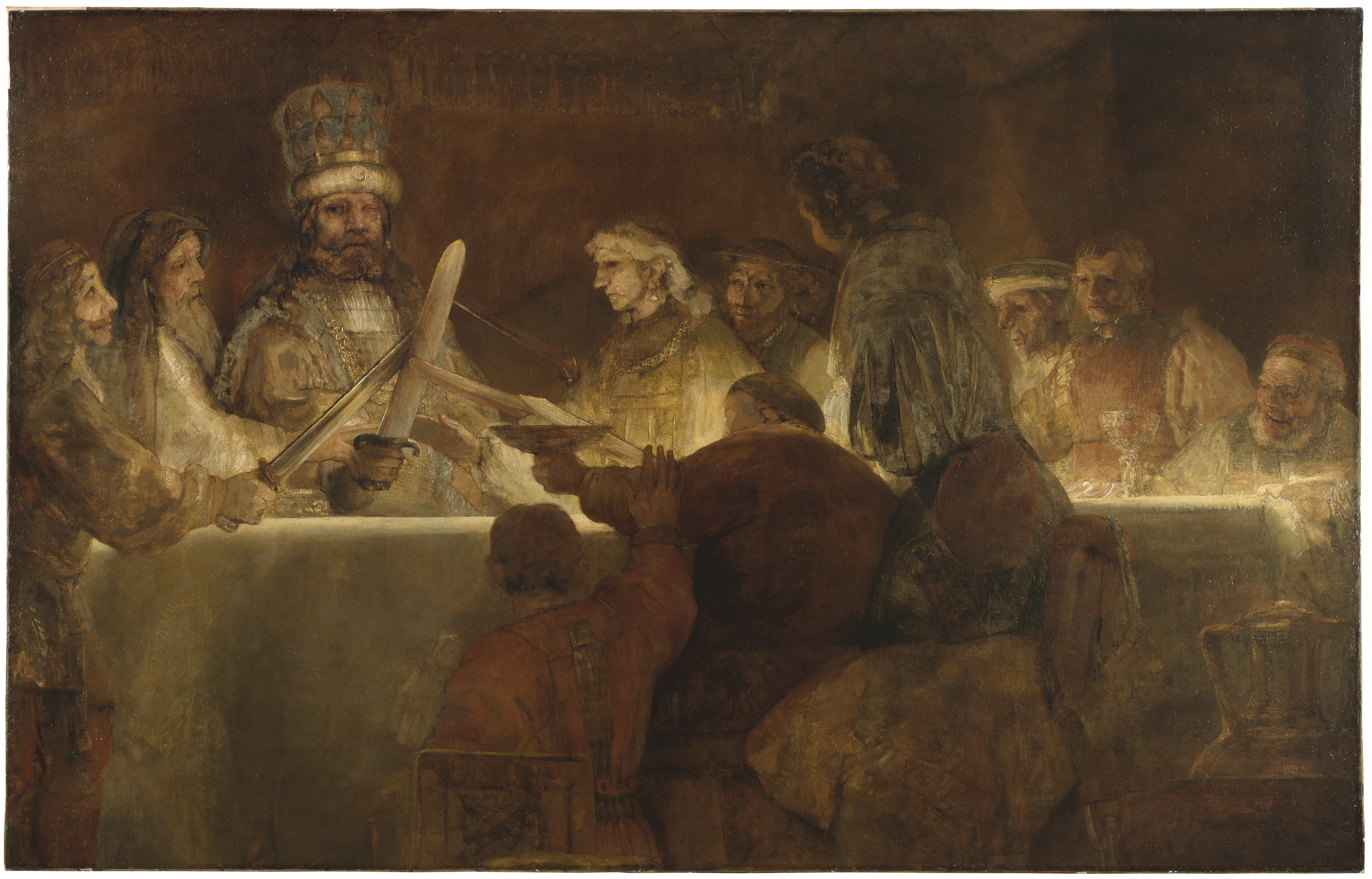
The Conspiracy of Claudius Civilis (cut-down) (1661–62)

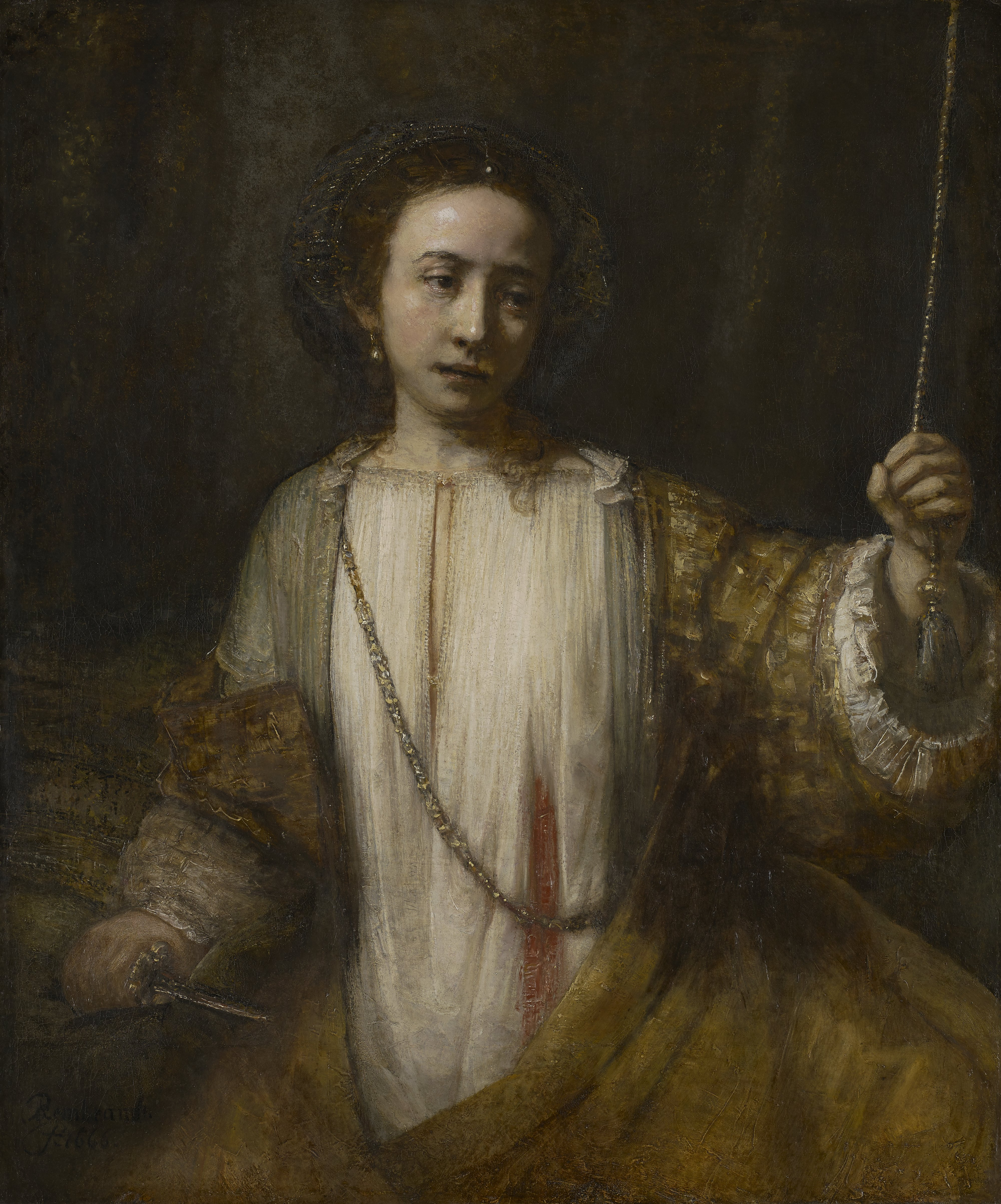
Lucretia (1666), Minneapolis Institute of Art

The Return of the Prodigal Son (c. 1669), Hermitage Museum, Saint Petersburg, Russia

== Drawings and etchings ==
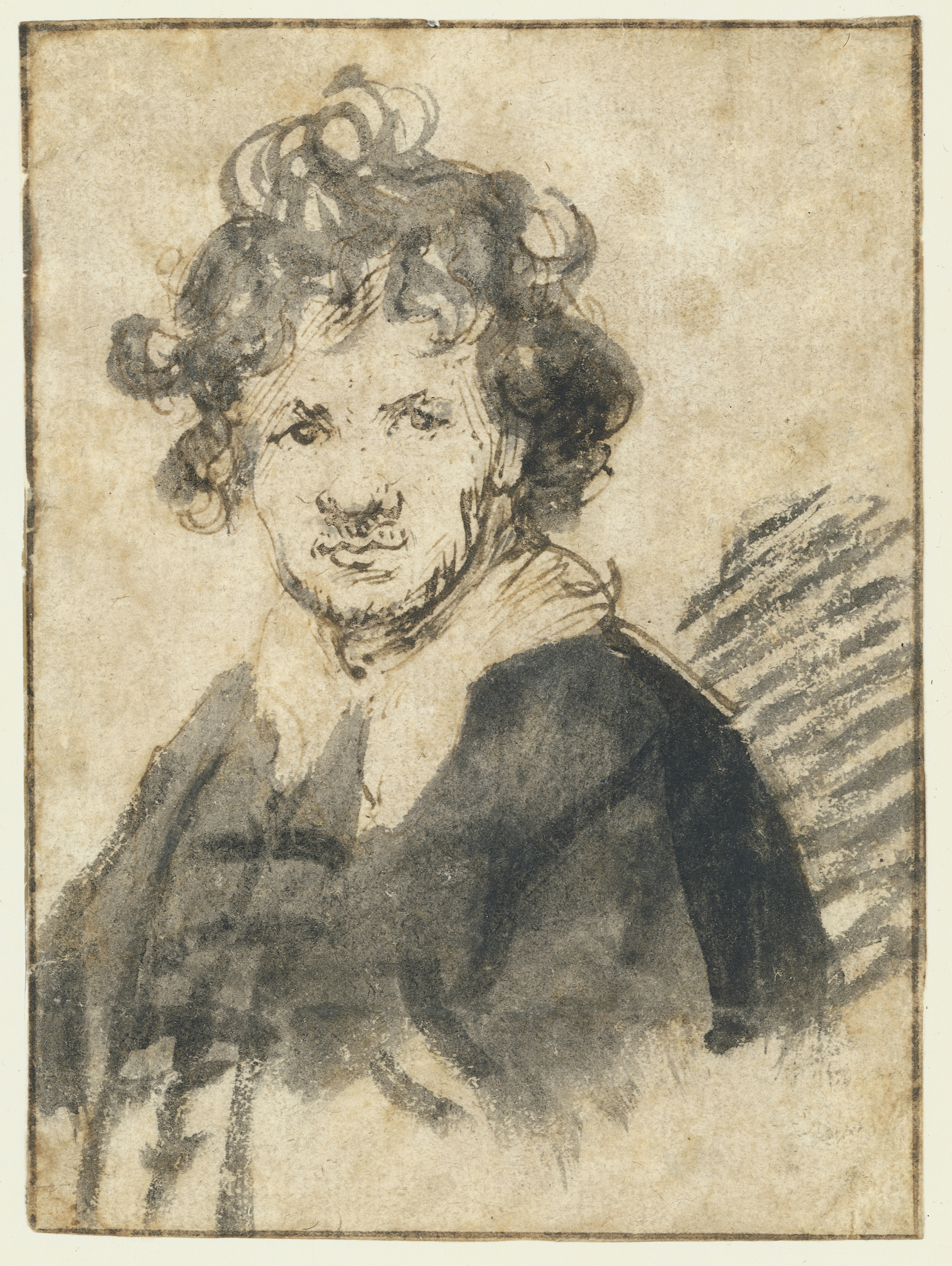
Self-portrait, c. 1628–29, pen and brush and ink on paper

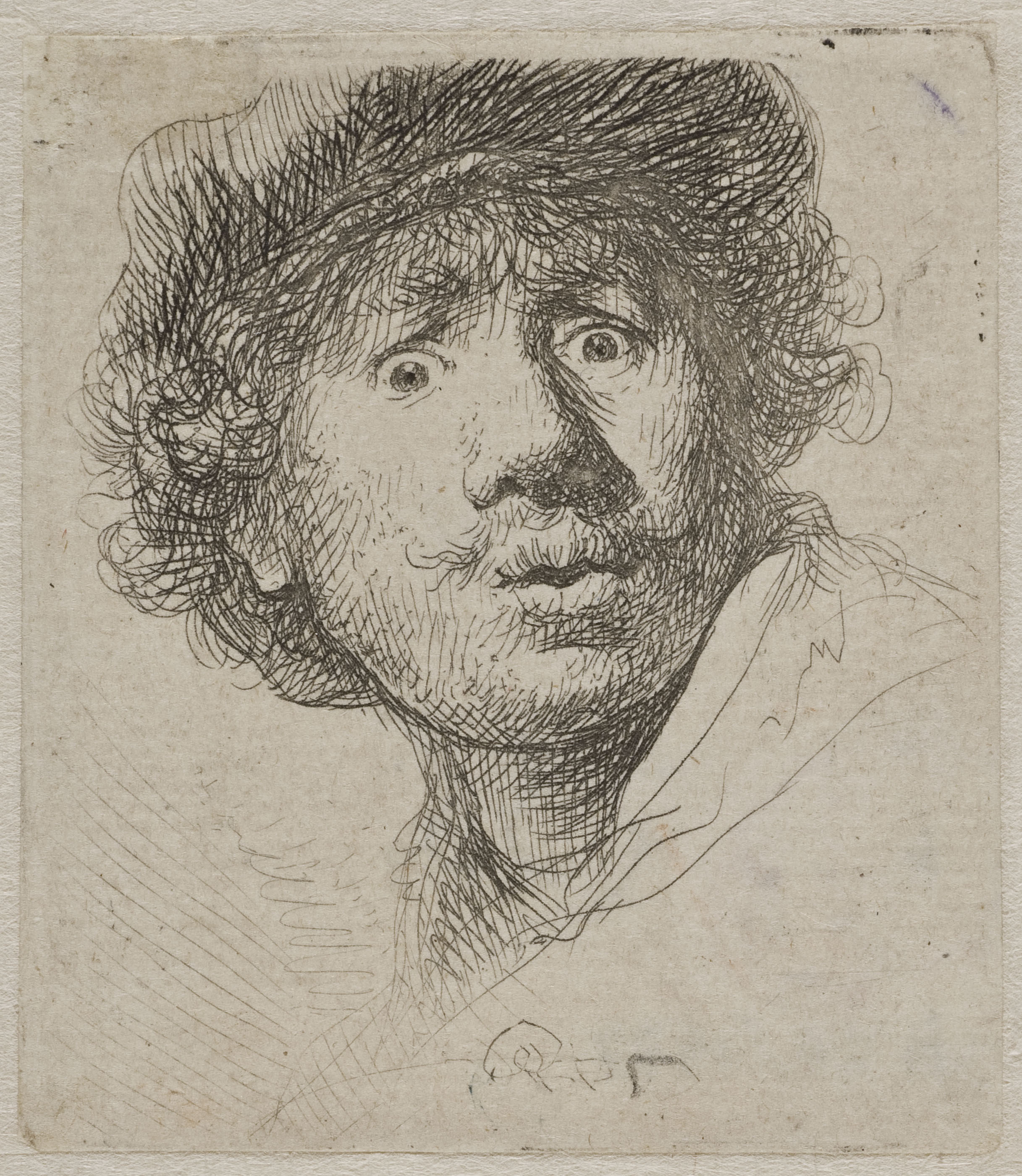
Self-portrait in a cap, with eyes wide open, 1630, etching and burin

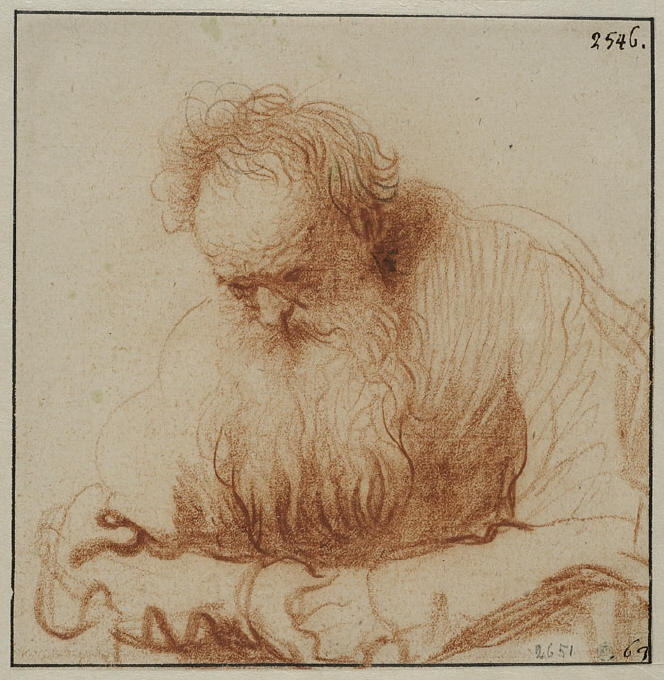
Seated Old Man (c. 1630), red and black chalk on paper, Nationalmuseum, Stockholm

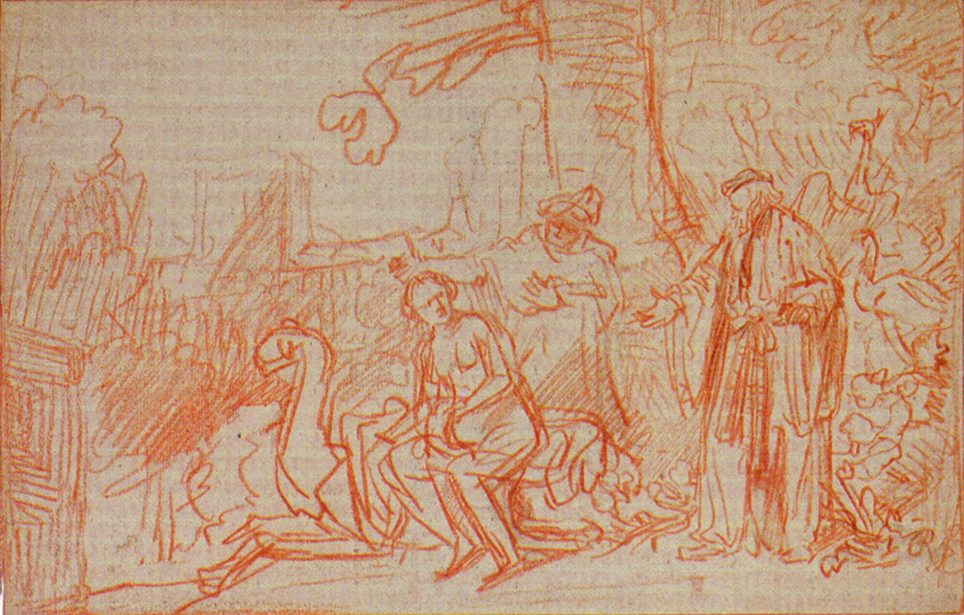
Suzannah and the Elders, 1634, drawing in Sanguine on paper, Kupferstichkabinett Berlin

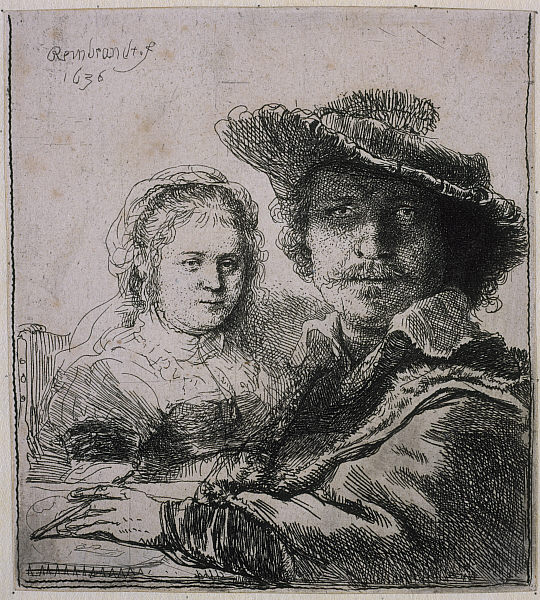
Self-portrait with Saskia, 1636, etching

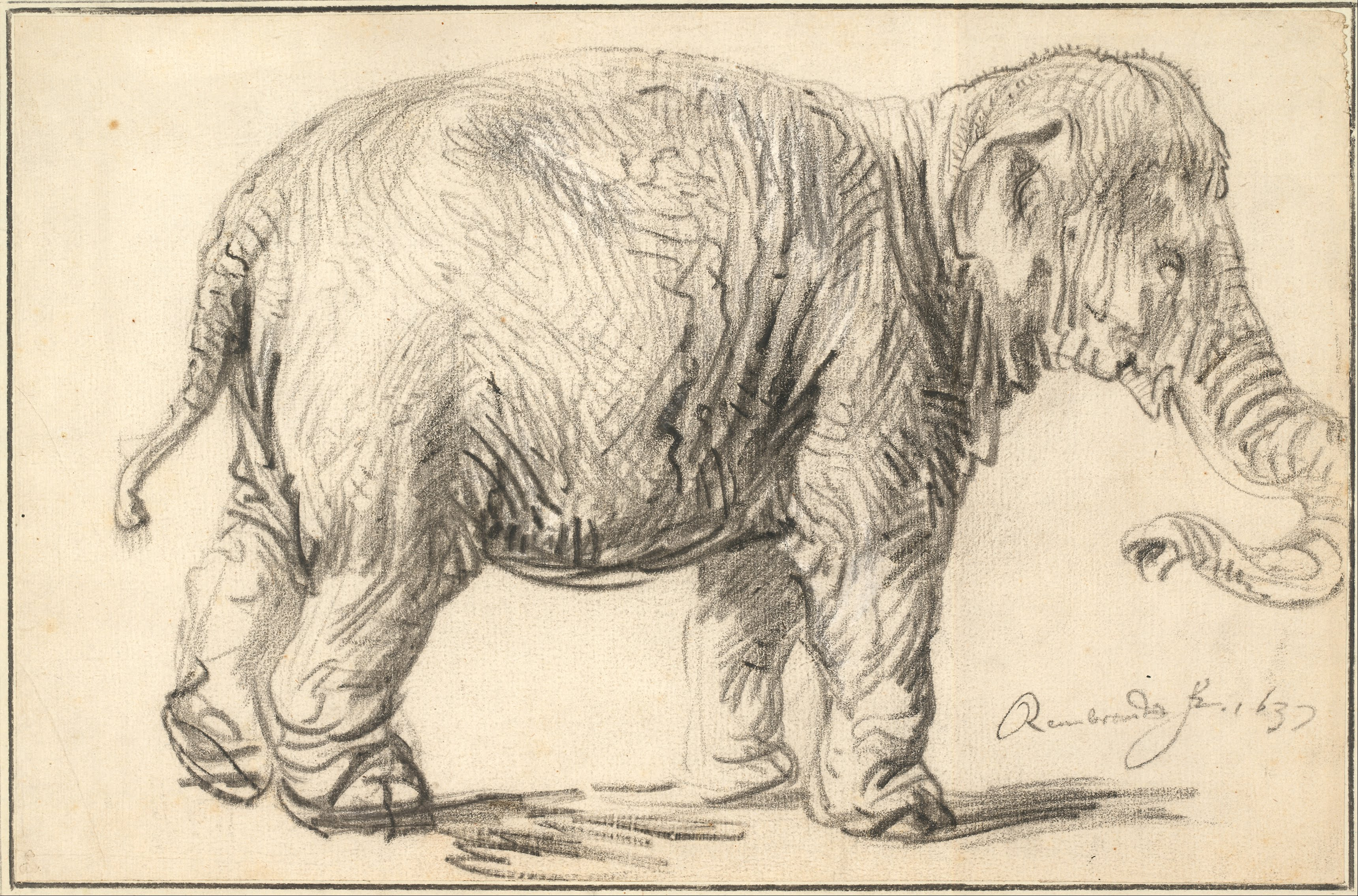
An elephant, 1637, drawing in black chalk on paper, Albertina, Austria

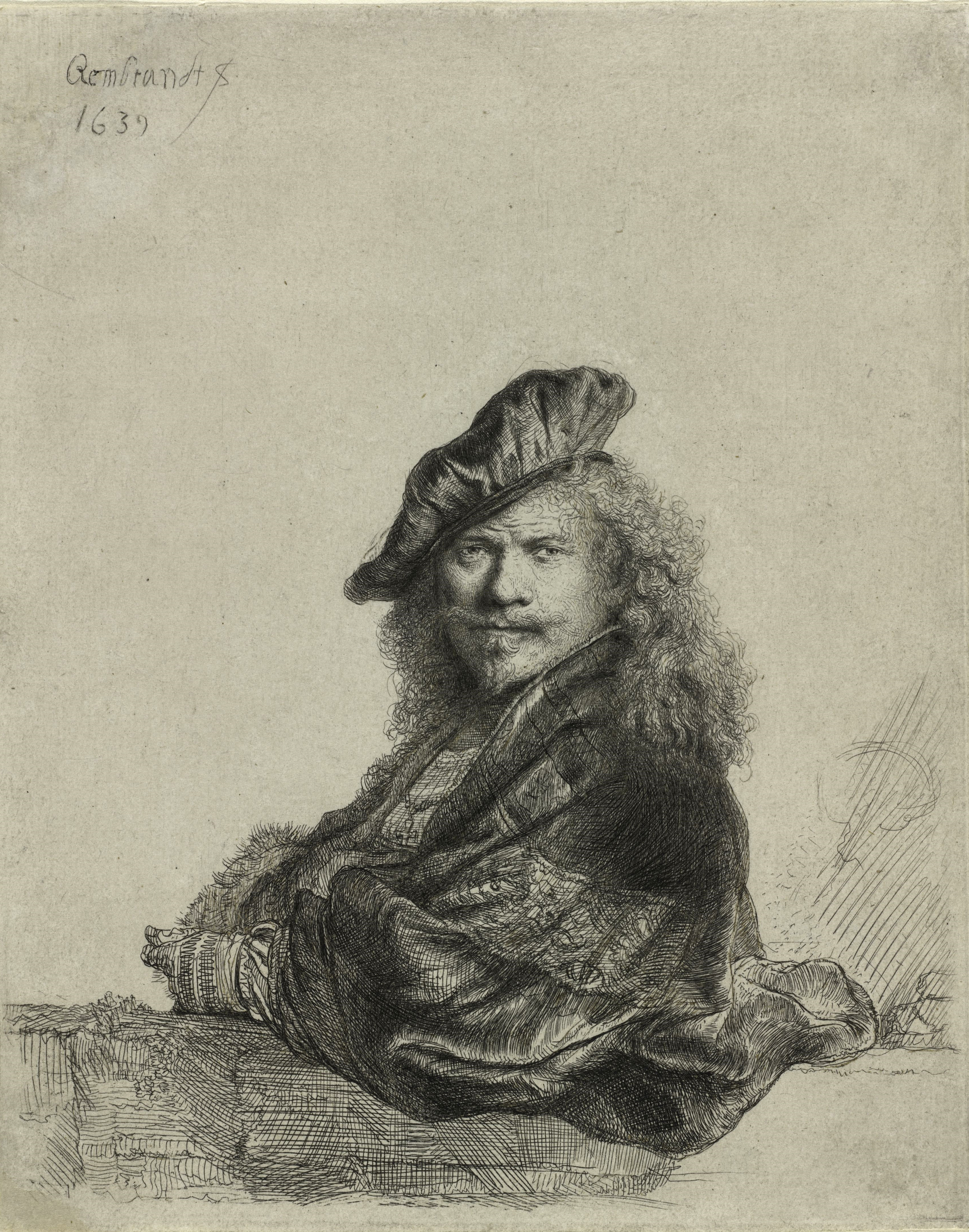
Self-portrait leaning on a Sill, 1639, etching

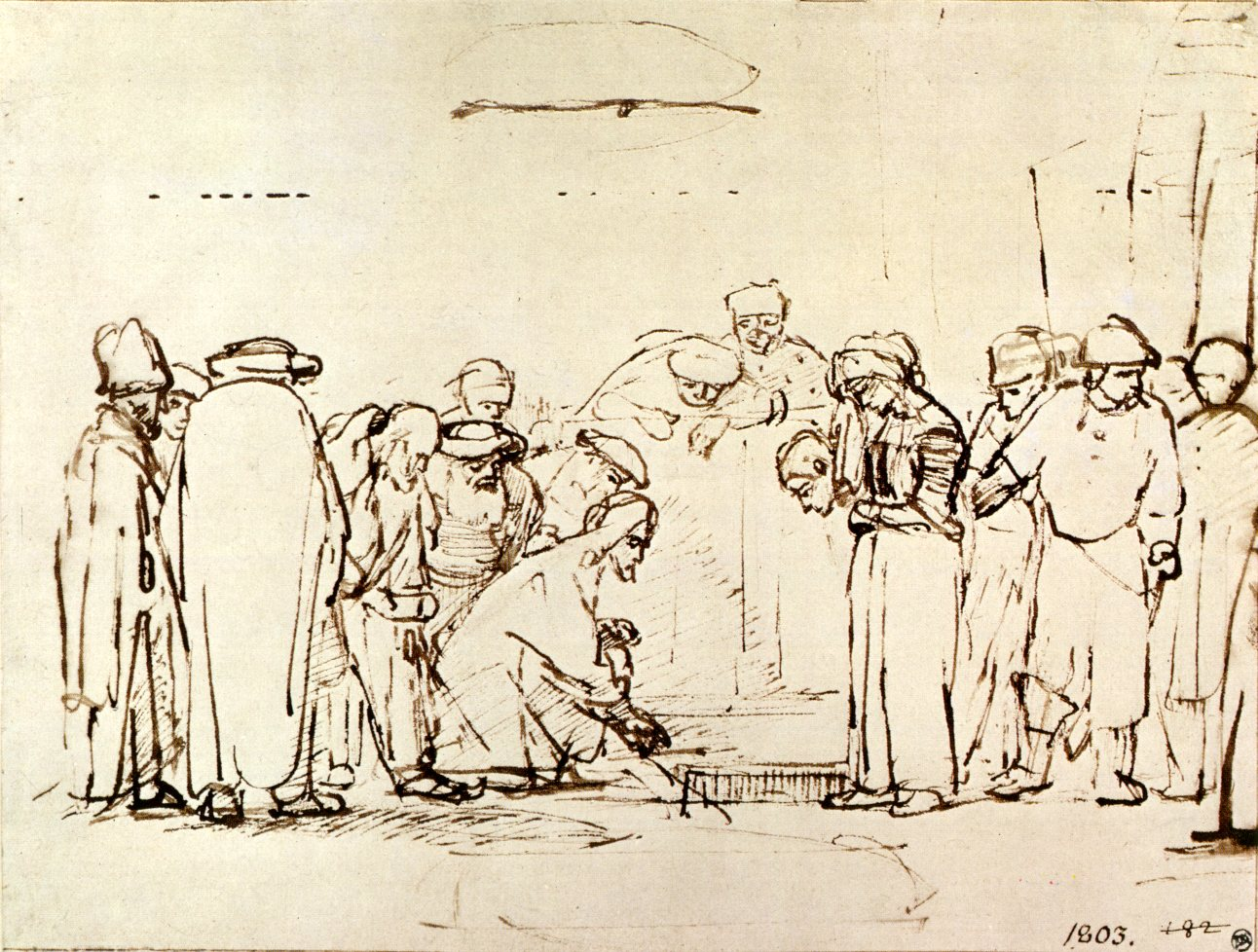
Christ and the woman taken in adultery, c. 1639–41, drawing in ink, Louvre

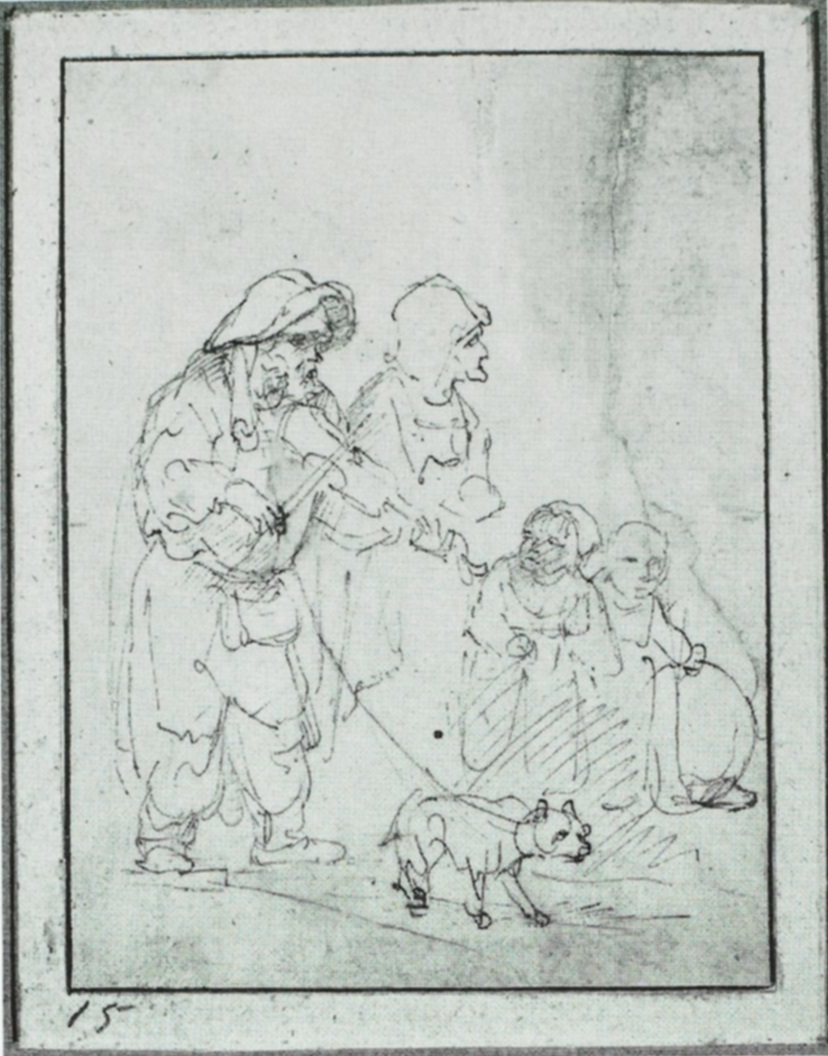
Beggars I., c. 1640–42, ink on paper, Warsaw University Library

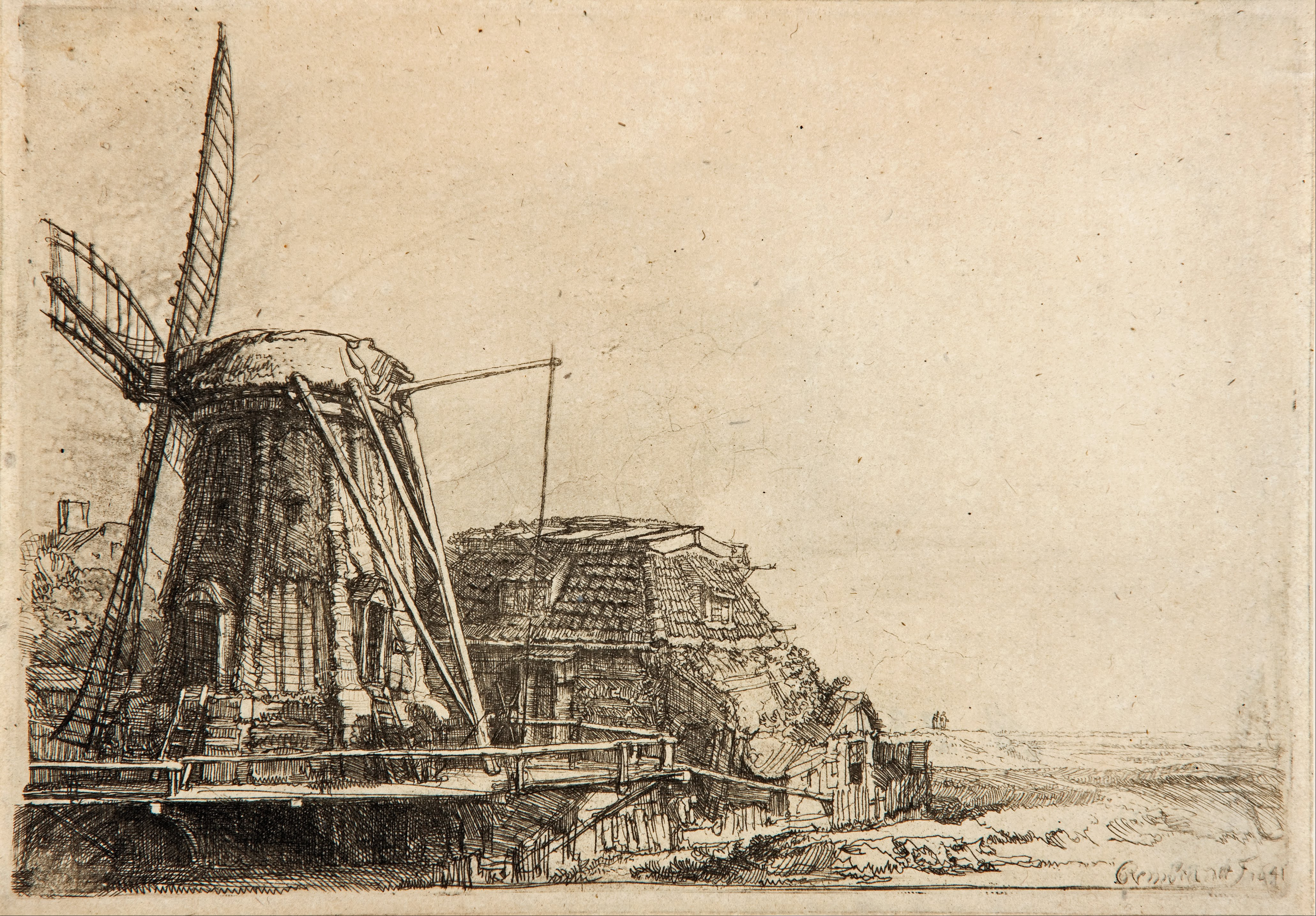
The Windmill, 1641, etching

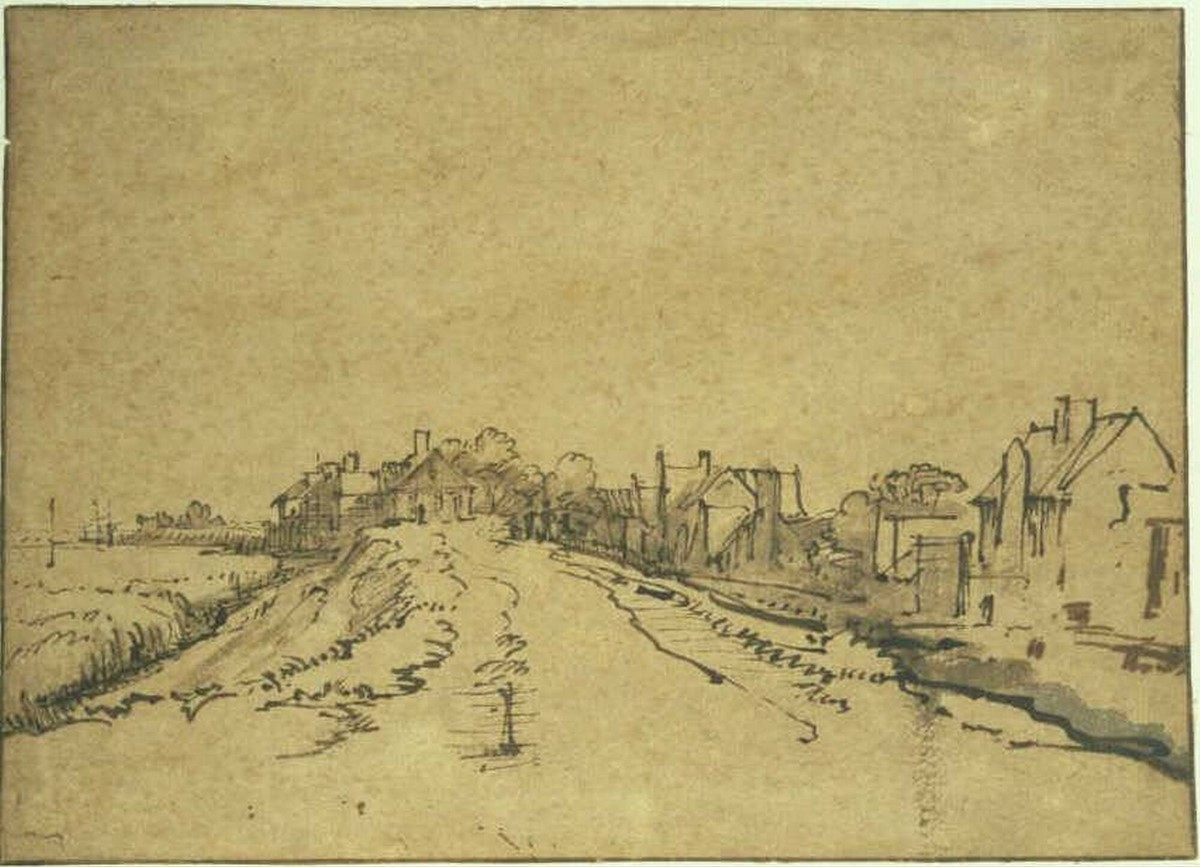
The Diemerdijk at Houtewael (near Amsterdam), 1648–49, pen and brown ink, brown wash, Museum Boijmans Van Beuningen

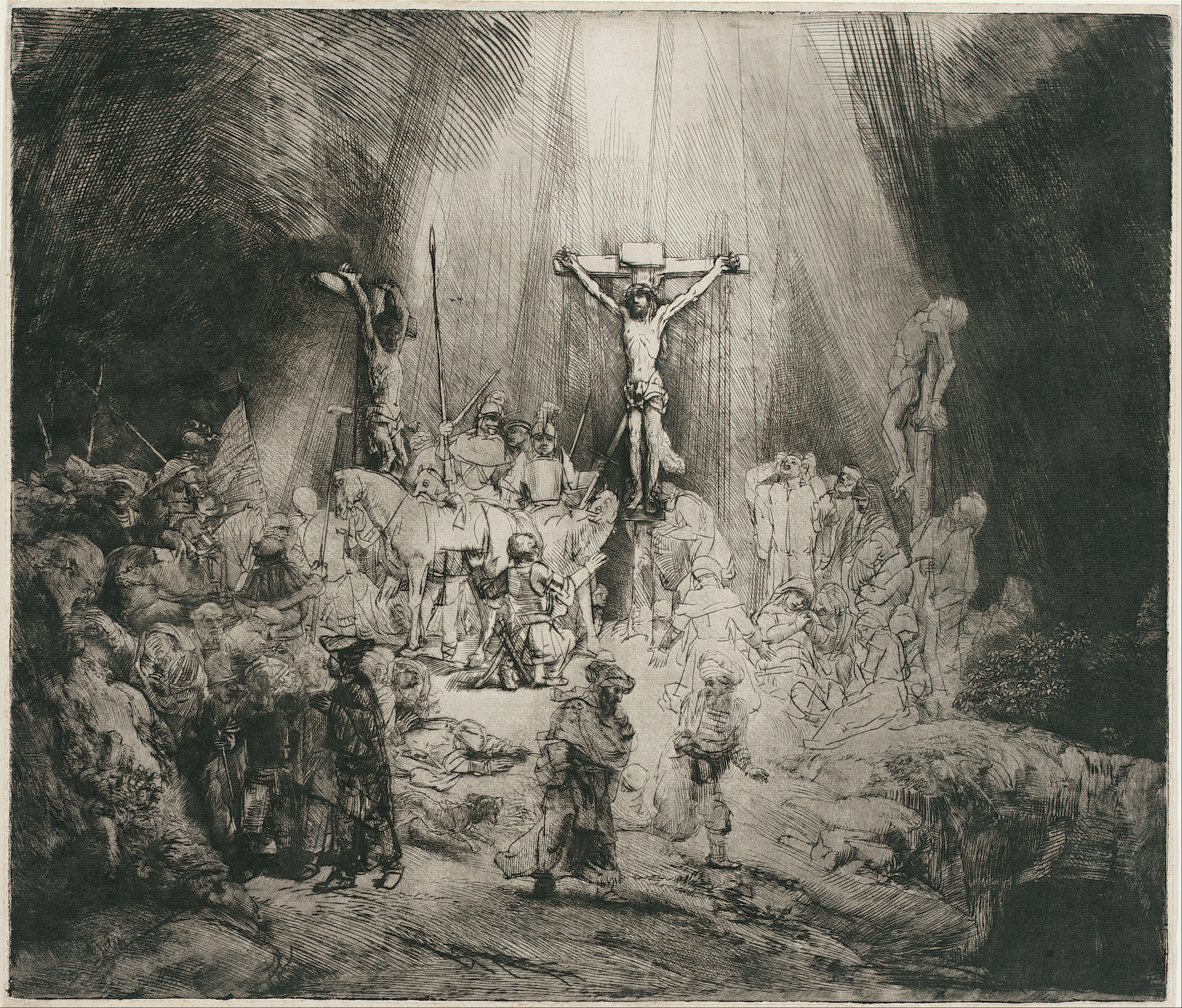
The Three Crosses, 1653, drypoint etching, state III of V

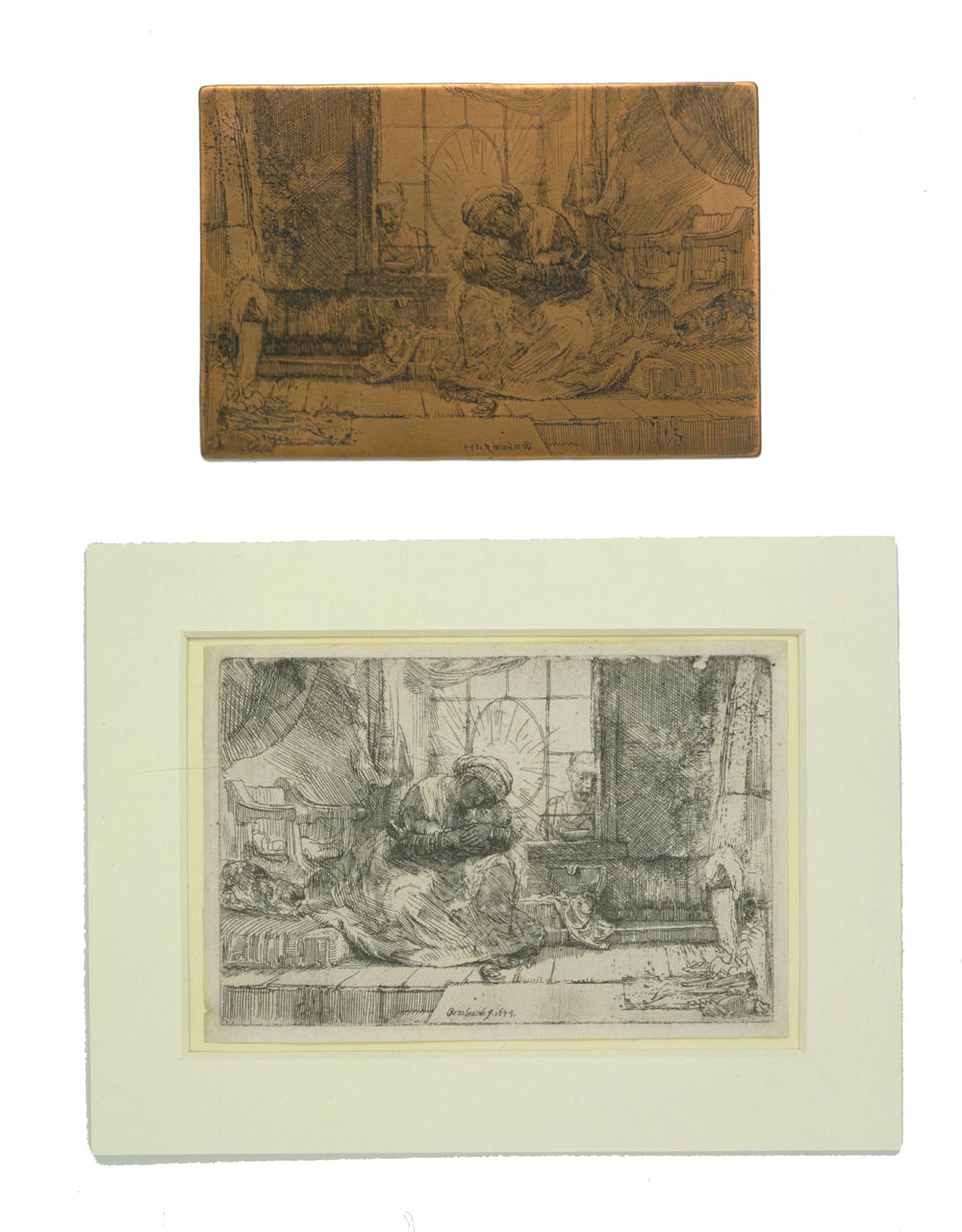
Virgin and Child with a Cat, 1654, original copper etching plate above (the original copper plate), in Victoria and Albert Museum, example of the print below

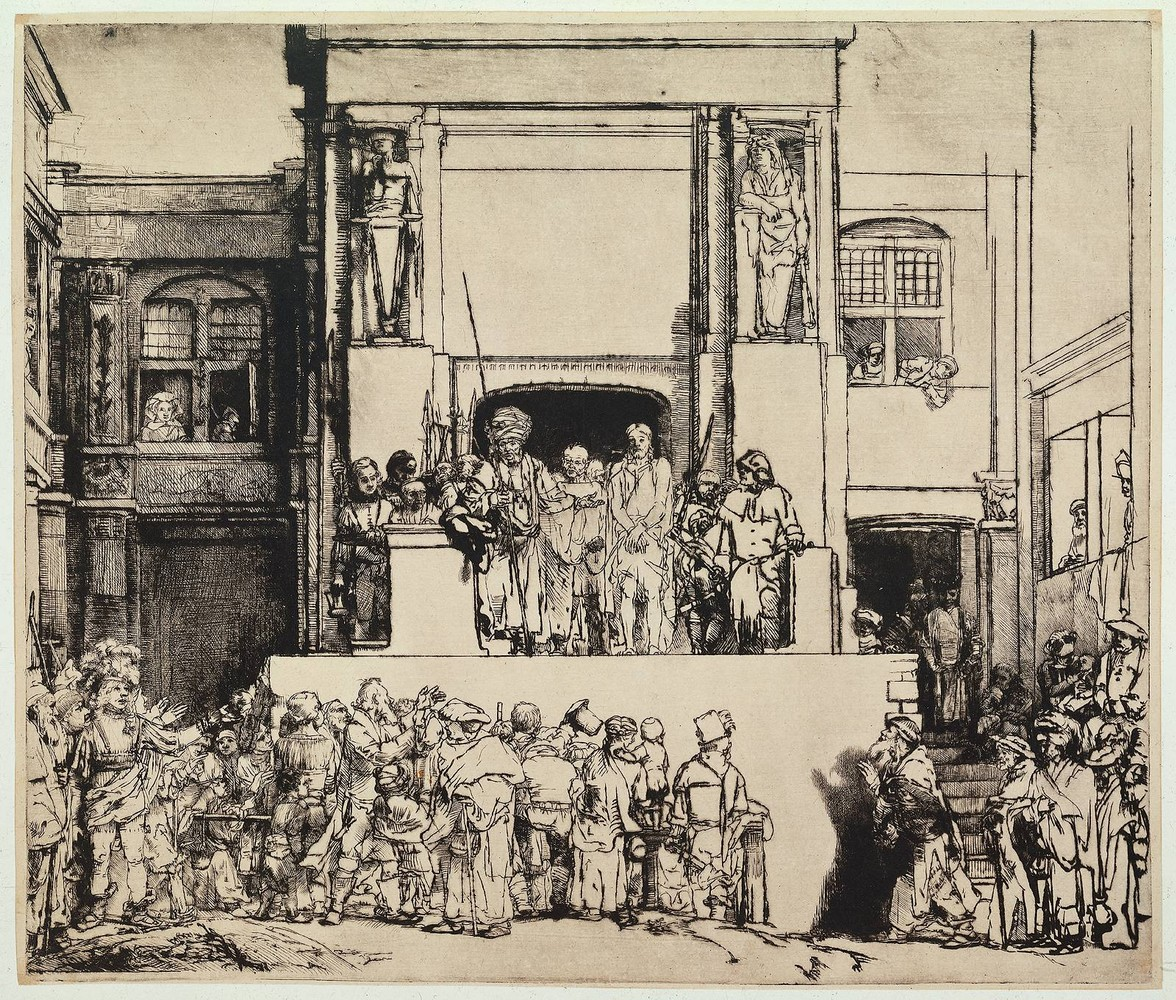
Christ presented to the People, drypoint etching, 1655, state I of VIII

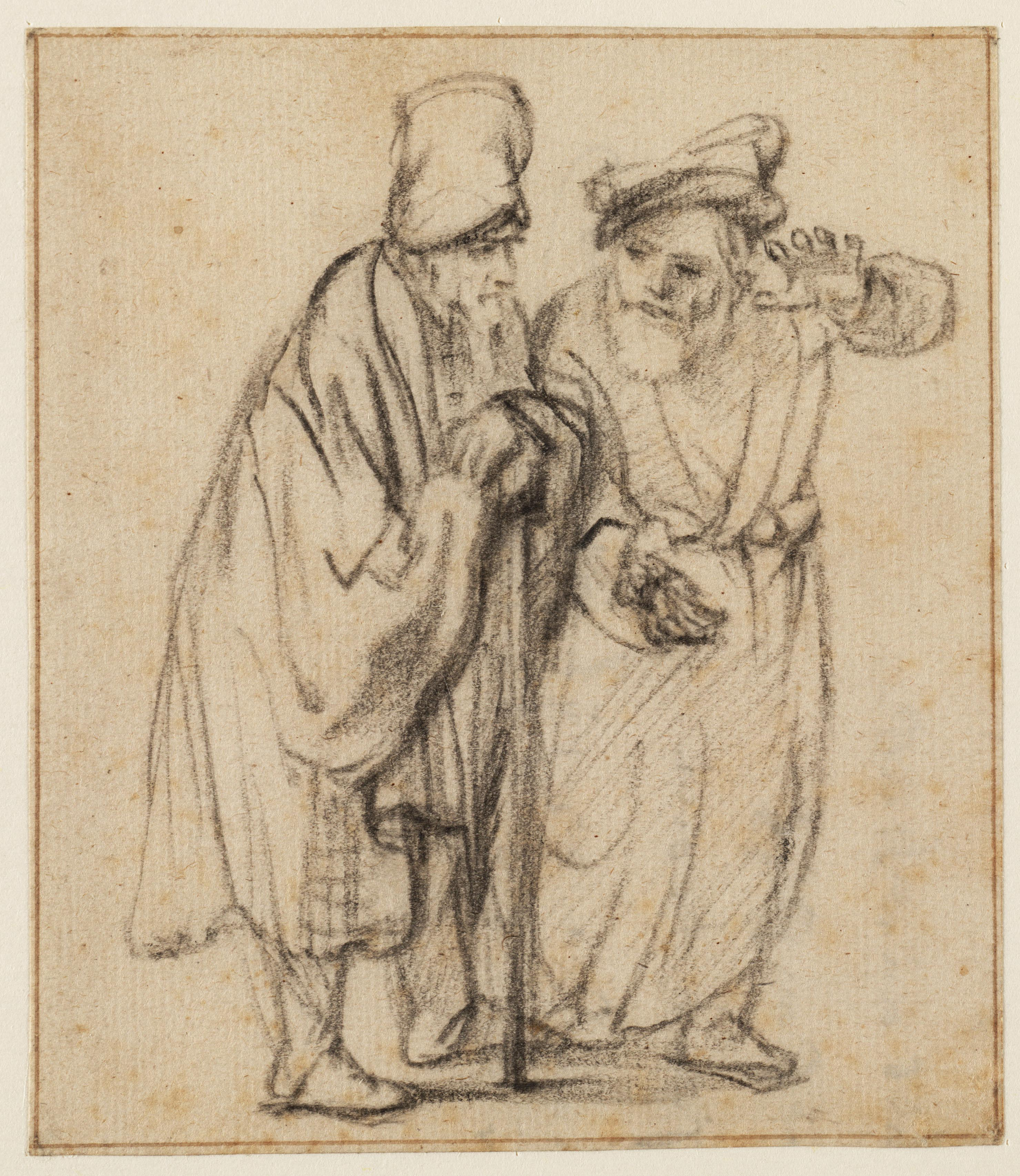
Two Old Men in Conversation /Two Jews in Discussion, Walking, year unknown, black chalk and brown ink on paper, Teylers Museum

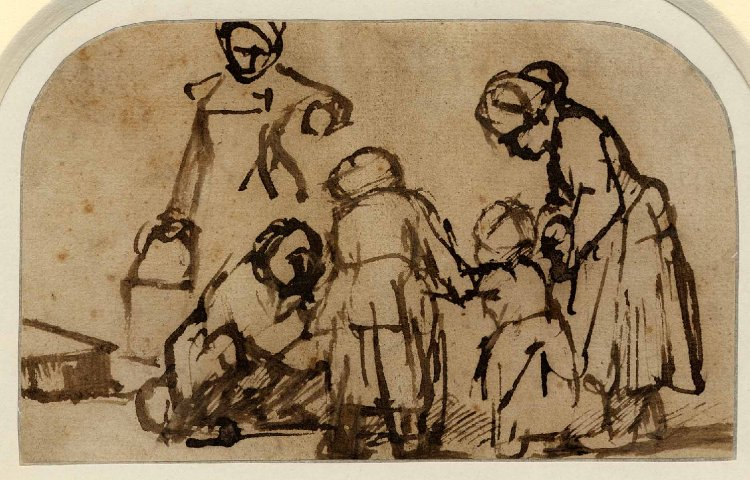
A child being taught to walk (c. 1635)

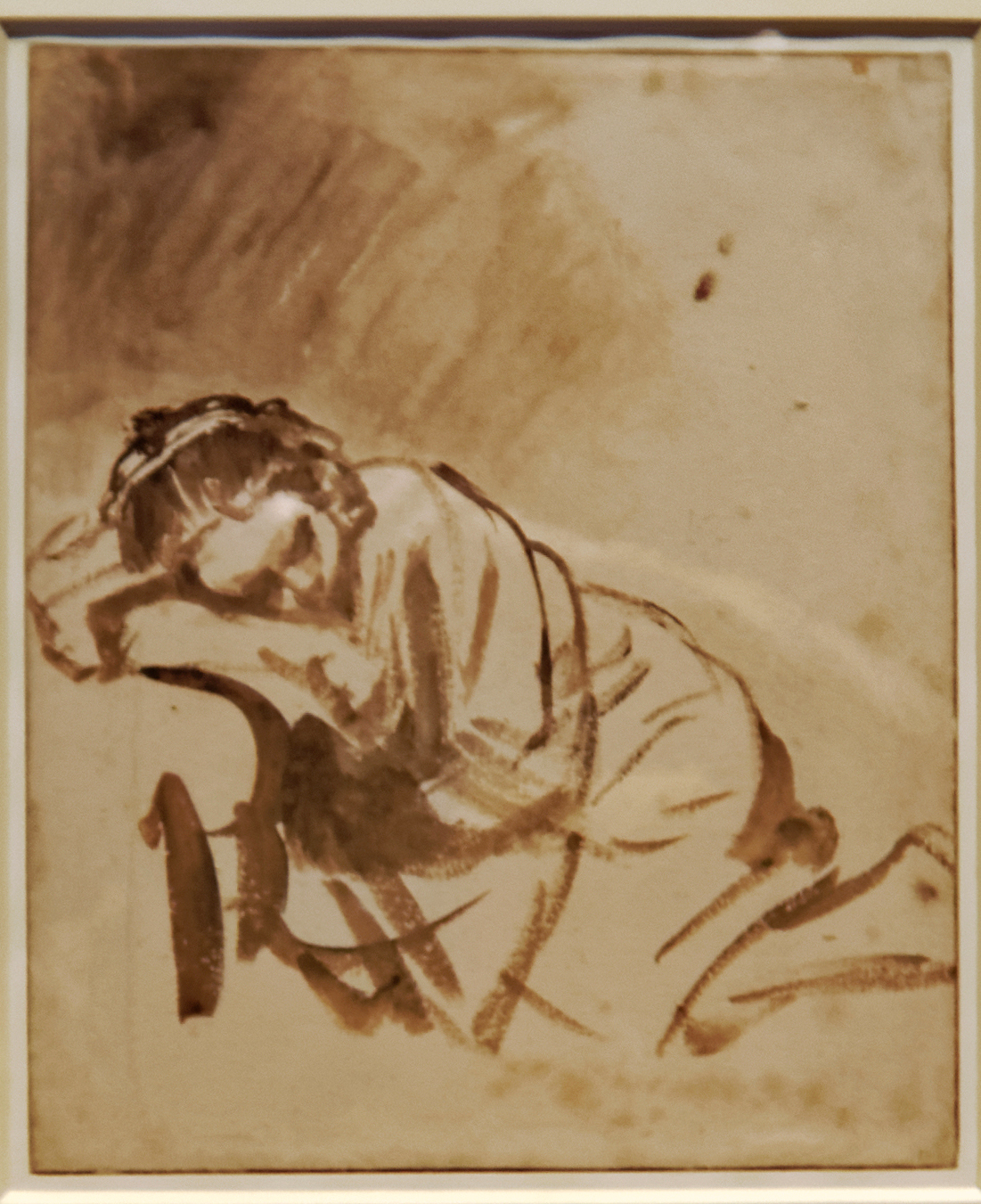
A young woman sleeping (c. 1654). Shows Rembrandt's calligraphic-style draughtsmanship.

== Works about Rembrandt ==
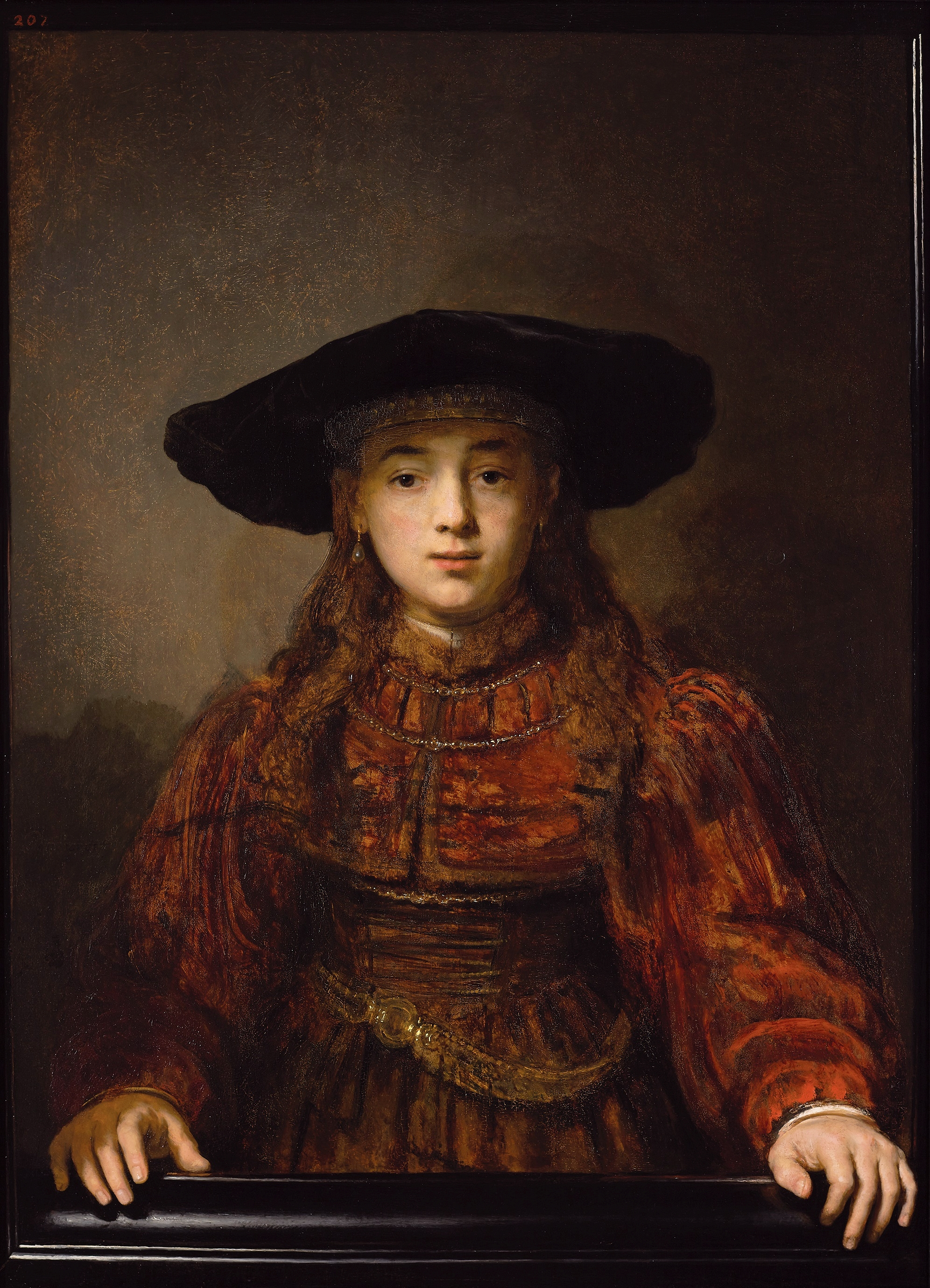
The Girl in a Picture Frame (1641), Royal Castle, Warsaw

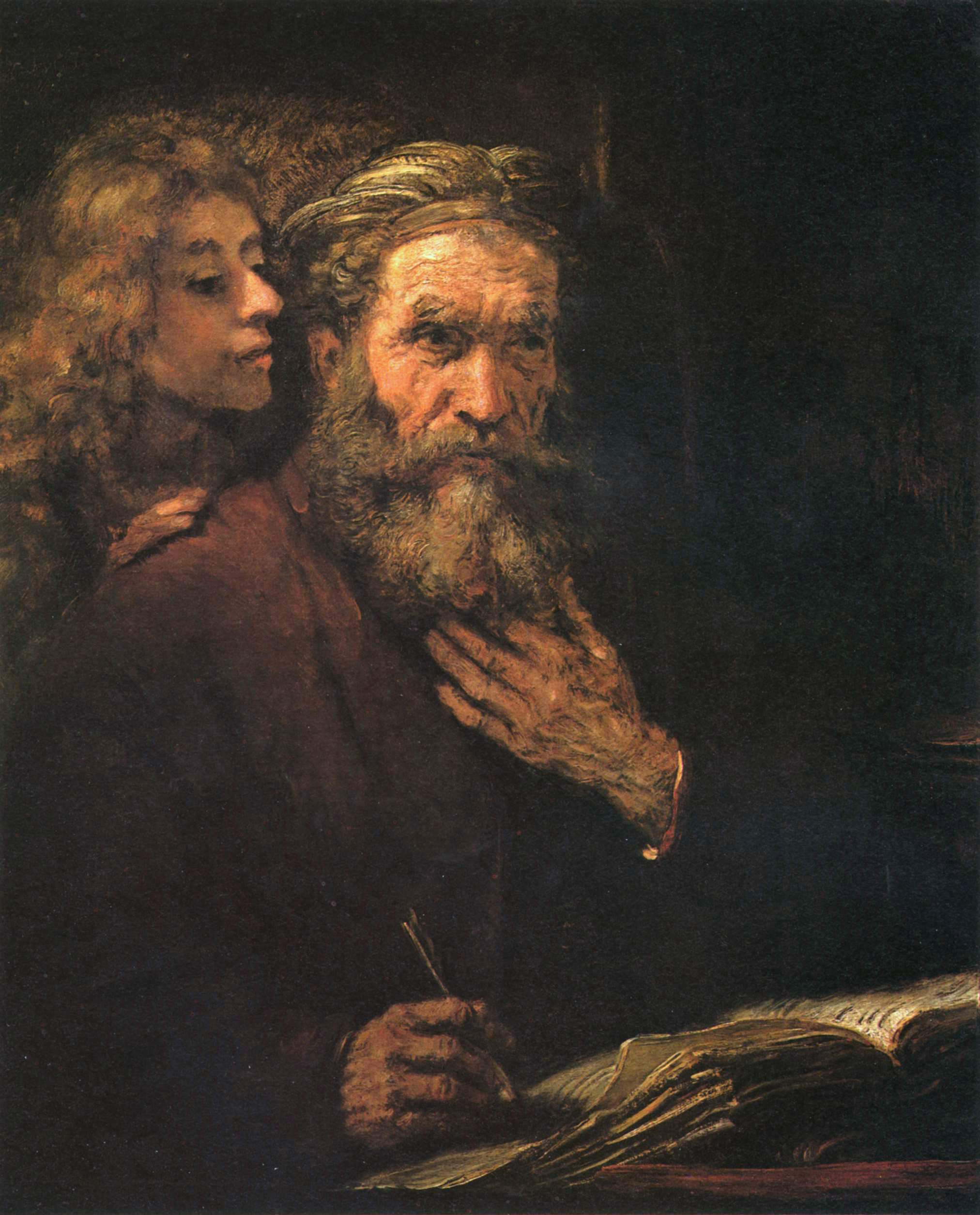
The evangelist Matthew and the Angel (1661)

=== Literary works (e.g. poetry and fiction) ===
- To the Picture of Rembrandt, a Russian-language poem by Mikhail Lermontov, 1830
- Gaspard de la nuit: Fantaisies à la manière de Rembrandt et de Callot, a series of French-language poems by Aloysius Bertrand, 1842
- Picture This, a novel by Joseph Heller, 1988
- Moi, la Putain de Rembrandt, a French-language novel by Sylvie Matton, 1998
- Van Rijn, a novel by Sarah Emily Miano, 2006
- I Am Rembrandt's Daughter, a novel by Lynn Cullen, 2007
- The Rembrandt Affair, a novel by Daniel Silva, 2011
- The Anatomy Lesson, a novel by Nina Siegal, 2014
- Rembrandt's Mirror, a novel by Kim Devereux, 2015

=== Music ===
- The Donna Summer song "Dinner with Gershwin" contain the lyrics "I want to watch Rembrandt sketch."
- The Scott Walker song "Duchess" features the lyrics "It's your bicycle bells / and your Rembrandt swells"
- The song on the Dreamville album Revenge of the Dreamers III "Rembrand... Run it Back"

=== Films ===
- The Stolen Rembrandt, a 1914 film directed by Leo D. Maloney and J. P. McGowan
- The Tragedy of a Great / Die Tragödie eines Großen, a 1920 film directed by Arthur Günsburg
- The Missing Rembrandt, a 1932 film directed by Leslie S. Hiscott
- Rembrandt, a 1936 film directed by Alexander Korda and starring Charles Laughton
- Rembrandt, a 1940 film
- Rembrandt in de schuilkelder / Rembrandt in the Bunker, a 1941 film directed by Gerard Rutten
- Rembrandt, a 1942 film directed by Hans Steinhoff
- Rembrandt: A Self-Portrait, a 1954 documentary film by Morrie Roizman
- Rembrandt, schilder van de mens / Rembrandt, Painter of Man, a 1957 film directed by Bert Haanstra
- Rembrandt fecit 1669, a 1977 film directed by Jos Stelling
- Rembrandt: The Public Eye and the Private Gaze, a 1992 documentary film by Simon Schama
- Rembrandt, a 1999 film directed by Charles Matton
- Rembrandt: Fathers & Sons, a 1999 film directed by David Devine
- Stealing Rembrandt, a 2003 film directed by Jannik Johansen and Anders Thomas Jensen
- Simon Schama's Power of Art: Rembrandt, a 2006 BBC documentary film series by Simon Schama
- Nightwatching, a 2007 film directed by Peter Greenaway
- Rembrandt's J'Accuse, a 2008 documentary film by Peter Greenaway
- Rembrandt en ik, a 2011 film directed by Marleen Gorris
- Schama on Rembrandt: Masterpieces of the Late Years, a 2014 documentary film by Simon Schama
