= I Am Rembrandt's Daughter =

2007 novel by Lynn Cullen

- Author: Lynn Cullen
- Publisher: Bloomsbury USA
- Publication date: June 1, 2007
- ISBN: 9781599900469

I Am Rembrandt's Daughter is a 2007, young adult historical fiction novel by Lynn Cullen about the famous artist Rembrandt van Rijn's daughter Cornelia van Rijn (1654–1684). In Cullen's version of the story, Cornelia finds that she is not Rembrandt's daughter, but rather that of Nicolaes Bruyningh, the subject of one of Rembrandt's paintings. The novel was selected by YALSA as one of the Best Books for Young Adults in 2008.

== Summary ==
The novel is told through a series of flashbacks describing key parts from her childhood and most of her teenage life.

During one of the first flashbacks of the novel, Cornelia is sent upstairs to put the cat in the attic when she unrolls a picture. When she realizes that the painting is her mother, nude, she becomes ashamed of her. As her mother appears in the doorway, she runs past her.

In a flashback to her childhood, Cornelia is unknowingly introduced to her biological father. Around the age of five, Cornelia runs home crying because she has lied to her friend about having an ivory doll. When the Nicolaes, whom she calls Gold Mustache Man, walks past, she tells him what is wrong, and, some days later, she finds a doll sitting on her stoop, waiting for her. In her excitement, Cornelia runs to Rembrandt and tells him of what she has been given, but he takes the doll and sells it. Cornelia goes to her mother for comfort, which is something she does many times in the story. The day her mother dies, Cornelia goes to her mother's room and sees her lying in bed with the spots of the plague on her. Her father tells her to leave and throws her mother's beads at her. When Cornelia stumbles outside, the Gold Mustache Man walks towards her and when she tells him her mother is dead he runs away.

At the beginning of the novel, Cornelia, the supposed daughter of Rembrandt, describes how she has never gotten a chance to experience the things her wealthier friends have been able to do. Throughout the story, it is shown how close Cornelia is to her older brother, Titus, and how much she would rather not be Rembrandt's daughter. Rembrandt, Titus, and Cornelia struggle with their lack of money, though Cornelia is the only one showing her dislike for being so "lowly". When Titus announces that he is getting married, Cornelia is filled with a sense of loss at the idea of her brother leaving her. At the wedding, she sees a handsome boy, Carel, that she has trouble tearing her gaze from, until her father makes a scene when he sees the newlyweds' portrait. When he makes the bride spill her last drop of wine, which was bad luck, he causes the ceremony to come to a halt. Cornelia follows her father home and expresses how she feels ashamed of him.

Cornelia sees how her father calls out for Titus to come and view his work, but he never calls for her. When Rembrandt finishes his family portrait, Cornelia and Neel realize that he has painted the innocent eyes of the baby as Titus's. When Titus cannot figure it out, Rembrandt drops the subject. Through the rest of the book, Cornelia thinks of how the men separate themselves through their art. Cornelia wishes her father would teach her the trade, but he never looks to her as someone to learn it.

Over the days that follow the wedding, Rembrandt finishes a piece that he tries to sell. When he take Cornelia with him to a house he wants to use to sell the art, Carel answers the door and has to reject the painting. Titus makes Cornelia go back, without their father knowing, but the piece is rejected again. Carel seeing Cornelia twice, sparks something in him that makes him come to visit repeatedly throughout the story.

Rembrandt has forbidden Cornelia to see Carel again. When Titus comes back into the picture, he announces that he and his wife Magdalena are going to have a baby. Unfortunately, Titus becomes ill and Cornelia is forced to go shopping with Magdalena. Magdalena shows Cornelia how little she cares about those who need to make a profit when she tells her she's going to buy twice as much fabric at a discount and then return the extra for full price. When Cornelia and Magdalena return to her home, they see Titus lying on the bed with the tokens of the plague right under his ear. At a stressful point in the waiting for Titus to pull through, Rembrandt sees the beads that were once Hendrickje's and kicks Cornelia out to go to Nicolaes. Cornelia runs out of the house, but runs to Carel, who will not take her in. As Cornelia backs away in tears, she bumps in Nicolaes, who takes her in to explain to her the truth about her life.

Inside his home, he explains to her that he is her real father and that he left her mother because he had seen her posing nude for Rembrandt. When Cornelia realizes that Nicolaes never came for her because he would lose his money, she leaves and goes back to her brother. Rembrandt asks what he has told her and then tells her his side of the story and how he had promised her mother he would take care of her and Cornelia. When Titus dies, they have no money to pay for funeral bells, but for some reason they still ring. When Cornelia and Rembrandt get back to their home, they discover that Neel has paid for the bells to ring and that he does care for her and Rembrandt.

The very end of the story is told in a present tense. Cornelia is selling her father's things when two men walk in and criticize his work, though not noticing her. When one of the men finally decides he wants a painting, she does not want to sell it. Out of the back room comes Neel, who says no to selling the painting, the secret between the two being that it is Cornelia's own original piece.

== Characters ==
- Cornelia, the main character of this book and the narrator, is the assumed daughter of the artist Rembrandt. All her life she tells, how she wishes she could have some of the things the richer kids could get, for example, she tells her friend that she has an ivory doll, but she really does not. She gets the taste of engaging with the higher class when a young, handsome man, Carel, starts to talk and visit her. She also has better skills for painting than her brother Titus.
- Rembrandt, the father to Cornelia van Rijn and Titus van Rijn, is an outspoken old man. He stops being able to support his family when he takes up with Cornelia's mother. To make matters worse, he stops giving the customers what they want out of his art and makes lumpy, splotchy paintings. Rembrandt also takes care of Cornelia, though he is not her real father, but treats her as if she is his own.
- Moeder (mother), Rembrandt's lover Hendrickje Stoffels, the maid, who is ridiculed for having a child out of wedlock, and the mother of Cornelia. Hendrickje dies in a flashback phase of the book. Throughout her adult life, she takes part in lying to Cornelia out of love. After Nicolaes leaves her when he has already impregnated her, she takes up with Rembrandt, who says he will "care for her".
- Gold Mustache Man or Nicolaes, a rich man that seems kind, is Cornelia's real father. He abandons his child because she is of a lower class than he is. Cornelia refers to him as the "Gold Mustache Man" as a child because of his golden, blonde hair and mustache. He figures it was better to leave Hendrickje rather than stay and help her, he justifies himself by asking Cornelia "[w]hat [he] would [have been] to [her] without [his] money".
- Neel, a serious young man that is Rembrandt's only student, is the man that sees Cornelia as someone great and loves her. Throughout the stages of Rembrandt's decline in popularity, Neel stays loyal to him, leaving himself as his last student. Neel values the company of Rembrandt and his daughter, but mostly Cornelia. He is useful as an assistant, but also as someone who can look beyond what's placed in front of him and analyze the depth of a picture or a situation.
- Titus, the "brother" to Cornelia, is an ambitious and somewhat foolish man. He cares for his younger sister, but does not see things the way she sees them. Titus is more care free, but he is very dedicated to his family even after his father interrupted his wedding.
- Carel, the handsome first cousin to Cornelia, is a self-centered character who only cares about his own well being, even when Cornelia needs him to take her in after her father kicks her out.
- Magdalena, the rich wife of Titus, is a spoiled woman. She values her wealth and herself over her husband towards the end of the novel when "[s]he and her moeder [leave] for relatives in St. Annaparochie" when Titus gets sick. The main character puts Magdalena's lifestyle in perspective when she comments that Magdalena has "a cook, a maid, and a mother to jump to her every command".

== Reception ==
Reviewers have commented on the novel's emotional appeal. For instance, Gillian Engberg of Booklist commented that I Am Rembrandt's Daughter is "noteworthy for emotional depth", adding that it is an "absorbing romantic story". Stephanie Murphy agreed, calling it an "emotionally touching book".

The realism of the characters also impressed readers. Publishers Weekly noted it as "sensitively sketched first novel paints a compelling portrait of [Cornelia]", adding that it had "colorful cast". Booklist noted the novel's "heartbreaking individuals" and the author's "sensitive development of characters" and remarked that the novel is a "powerful family drama". Murphy reminded readers that it was "based on real [people]".

Reviewers also pointed out the difference between this novel and most young adult fiction: its setting in a world of art history. One reviewer noted the author "uses paintings in effective ways to tether the story" and another commented on the novel's "highly atmospheric Dutch setting".

Not all reviews were positive, however. Kirkus called the story "achingly familiar".

== Bibliography ==
Cullen, Lynn. I Am Rembrandt's Daughter. New York: Bloomsbury Children's Books, 2007.
