= Rembrandt (1936 film) =

- DVD Cover
- Directed by: Alexander Korda
- Written by: June Head; Lajos Bíró; Arthur Wimperis
- Based on: story by Carl Zuckmayer
- Produced by: Alexander Korda
- Starring: Charles Laughton; Gertrude Lawrence; Elsa Lanchester; Edward Chapman
- Cinematography: Georges Périnal
- Edited by: Francis D. Lyon; William Hornbeck (sup)
- Music by: Geoffrey Toye
- Production company: London Film Productions
- Distributed by: United Artists
- Release date: 6 November 1936
- Running time: 85 minutes
- Country: United Kingdom
- Language: English
- Box office: £400,000

Rembrandt is a 1936 British biographical film made by London Film Productions of the life of 17th-century Dutch painter Rembrandt van Rijn. The film was produced and directed by Alexander Korda from a screenplay by June Head and Lajos Bíró based on a story by Carl Zuckmayer. The music score was by Geoffrey Toye and the cinematography by Georges Périnal.

== Plot ==
The film is set in mid 17th-century Amsterdam. Rembrandt's wife Saskia dies after a long illness. She was not only his great love, but also his only model. In his grief, he paints Saskia one last time before her image threatens to disappear forever. Shortly before her death, Rembrandt had received the commission for his famous painting The Night Watch from the civic militia of the city. However when the painting is unveiled, his clients cannot recognize themselves as the respectable gentlemen they are, and are furious, threatening not to pay. Rembrandt's apprentices leave, fearing social stigma, and he then gets drunk, along with his wife's maid Geertje, with whom he shares a mutual attraction.

Ten years later, Rembrandt is heavily in debt. His possessions have already been sold, but his debts remain overwhelming. Rembrandt meets a beggar who first models for him for a painting of King Saul and then teaches him how to beg, but Rembrandt has no talent for begging. Finally, Rembrandt flees from his debts and his now partner Geertje - who orders him to accept work from the prosperous merchants and nobles which would bring him solvency - to Leiden, where he stays with his father and brother, who run a mill, but the hard work is impossible for the sensitive artist.

Rembrandt returns home after a few days, where he meets his new maid Hendrickje Stoffels and finally finds peace again after Saskia's death. She becomes his new model and the two plan to be married. However due to a clause in his wife's will, Rembrandt must pay his son 20,000 florins if he remarries. Meanwhile, in a jealous rage, Geertje accuses Hendrickje of impropriety and she is excommunicated. Rembrandt, Hendrickje and his son move to the countryside, where he will be able to paint in peace and live with her. Hendrickje finds a way for him to escape his debts by declaring all his paintings to be her property, so that creditors cannot get their hands on Rembrandt's money as soon as he sells a painting. This allows the couple to return to Amsterdam and finally get married. Shortly before the wedding however, Hendrickje dies.

Years later, Rembrandt is a brokenhearted old man who drinks and lives in even greater poverty than in his younger years. He lives on handouts from friends, which he invests in paint to work on his last work, a self-portrait.

== Cast ==
- Charles Laughton as Rembrandt van Rijn
- Gertrude Lawrence as Geertje Dircx
- Elsa Lanchester as Hendrickje Stoffels
- Edward Chapman as Carel Fabritius
- Walter Hudd as Frans Banning Cocq
- Roger Livesey as Beggar Saul
- John Bryning as Titus van Rijn
- Sam Livesey as Auctioneer
- Herbert Lomas as Gerrit van Rijn
- Allan Jeayes as Dr. Tulp
- John Clements as Govert Flinck
- Raymond Huntley as Ludwick
- Abraham Sofaer as Dr. Menasseh
- Laurence Hanray as Heertsbeeke
- Austin Trevor as Marquis de Grand-Coeur
- Edmund Willard as Van Zeeland
- Henry Hewitt as Jan Six
- Gertrude Musgrove as Girl at Inn
- Marius Goring as Baron Leivens (uncredited)
- Wilfrid Hyde-White as Civil Guardsman (uncredited)
- Alexander Knox as Ludwick's Assistant (uncredited)
- Hay Petrie as Jeweller (uncredited)

== Production ==
Alexander Korda had previously worked with Laughton on The Private Life of Henry VIII— a hit “on both sides of the Atlantic”—and wanted to re-create that success.

In an article on TCM.com, Seattle Times critic Sean Axmaker describes the detailed preparations for the film, which included Korda and Laughton's repeated trips to Holland and Laughton's taking up painting and growing a mustache. “There were problems on the set, notably a clash with stage legend Gertrude Lawrence... She was quite the raconteur on set, entertaining the cast and crew, and especially Korda, with gossip and ribald stories while Laughton tried to focus on his part. Laughton had soundproof screens put around the set to keep the chatter and bustle down, but Korda's perceived neglect of Laughton in favor of Lawrence led to a rift between the actor and the director that was never repaired.”

Laughton's wife, Elsa Lanchester, noted in her autobiography that Lawrence "despised films so much that she wouldn't even attempt to learn the words" and wrote her lines on the large white cuffs of her costumes or on the back of a chair. Lanchester states that Korda and Laughton had considered showing several Rembrandt paintings on the screen, but "realized that the dramatic interest of the story lay in the creative needs that drove Rembrandt to paint." Believing that the actual paintings would only remind the audience that Laughton was not a painter, it was decided that the camera should show Laughton painting at an easel, but never show the actual brush touching the canvas.

According to a Laughton biography, Laughton had set designer Vincent Korda and costume designer John Armstrong teach him how to create the illusion of painting. Lanchester reports that Laughton visited Holland several times before shooting began and went to every museum that had Rembrandt paintings.

Lanchester plays Hendrickje, Rembrandt's maid and model, who becomes his lover and bears his daughter. Lanchester composed the music and lyrics for “Hendrickje's Theme”.

== Critical reception ==
In a 3 December 1936 review in The New York Times, B.R.Crisler, recommended the picture “in the strongest terms.”: "Charles Laughton and Alexander Korda have produced a great, and rich, and glowing motion picture in Rembrandt... a picture signed all over with distinction, like one of the master's own canvases... the noblest subject and the best likeness—so far, at any rate—in Mr. Laughton's inspired gallery of historical portraits”. Inspired “to raise ... perhaps undignified cheers,” the author pointed to the film's “courageous indifference to ‘romance,’ in the cheap Hollywood sense, its surprising, rather foreign awareness of the facts of life, and its resolute hewing to a line of individual integrity and character”.

In her “Shots and Angles” column in Maclean's (15 March 1947) Ann Ross recommended the “dignified, informative and beautifully acted picture.”

Writing for The Spectator in 1936, Graham Greene gave the film a poor review, describing it as "a series of unrelated tableaux". Greene found that "the film is ruined by lack of story ['line'] and continuity [...] [which is the] drive of a well-constructed plot". Greene gave some praise for the acting of Laughton and Lanchester, but condemned the direction stating "I have called the film reverent, but pompous, I fear, would be nearer the mark."

Time Out writes that although the film was "Less successful at the time than the earlier Private Life of Henry VIII, (it is) a far better film, thanks to a subtle, touching performance from Laughton as the ageing painter...Surprisingly sombre, it lacks a tight plot, but appeals through its vivid characterisation, superb Vincent Korda sets, and Georges Périnal's lovely camerawork."

In June 2018 the British Film Institute praised Rembrandt as “one of the most beautiful period films of its time. Laughton... is on fine form... the cinematography by Georges Périnal elegantly captures not just the painter’s life and times but also replicates the immersive, shadowy textures of his canvasses. One memorable scene, in which the widowed Rembrandt’s libido is reawakened by the sight of his maid walking up to her bedroom, is a tour de force of florid expressionism.”

Leonard Maltin gives 3.5 out of 4 stars to this “Handsome bio of Dutch painter, full of visual tableaux and sparked by Laughton's excellent performance.”

In 2007 Dennis Schwartz gave the film an A-minus: “(This) is a superior film and Korda has nothing to be ashamed of in the way he filmed it without the usual Hollywood action scenes. It features a marvelously spirited and subtle performance by Charles Laughton... Though the film only has a slight plot and there’s not much dramatic tension, it has a grand visual style.”

Rotten Tomatoes lists a 75% rating, based on 8 reviews, for an average of 7.1/10.

== In popular culture ==
The film is mentioned in Len Deighton's 1970 novel Bomber, which portrays an RAF night bombing raid on a German town in 1943. At the RAF bomber station at Warley Fen, as the aircrew prepare for take-off in the early evening, off-duty ground crew attend a screening of Rembrandt at the station cinema. The novel mentions that the turnout is so many, extra chairs are brought in from another building and latecomers sit in the aisles.
