= Hendrickje Stoffels =

Partner of Rembrandt

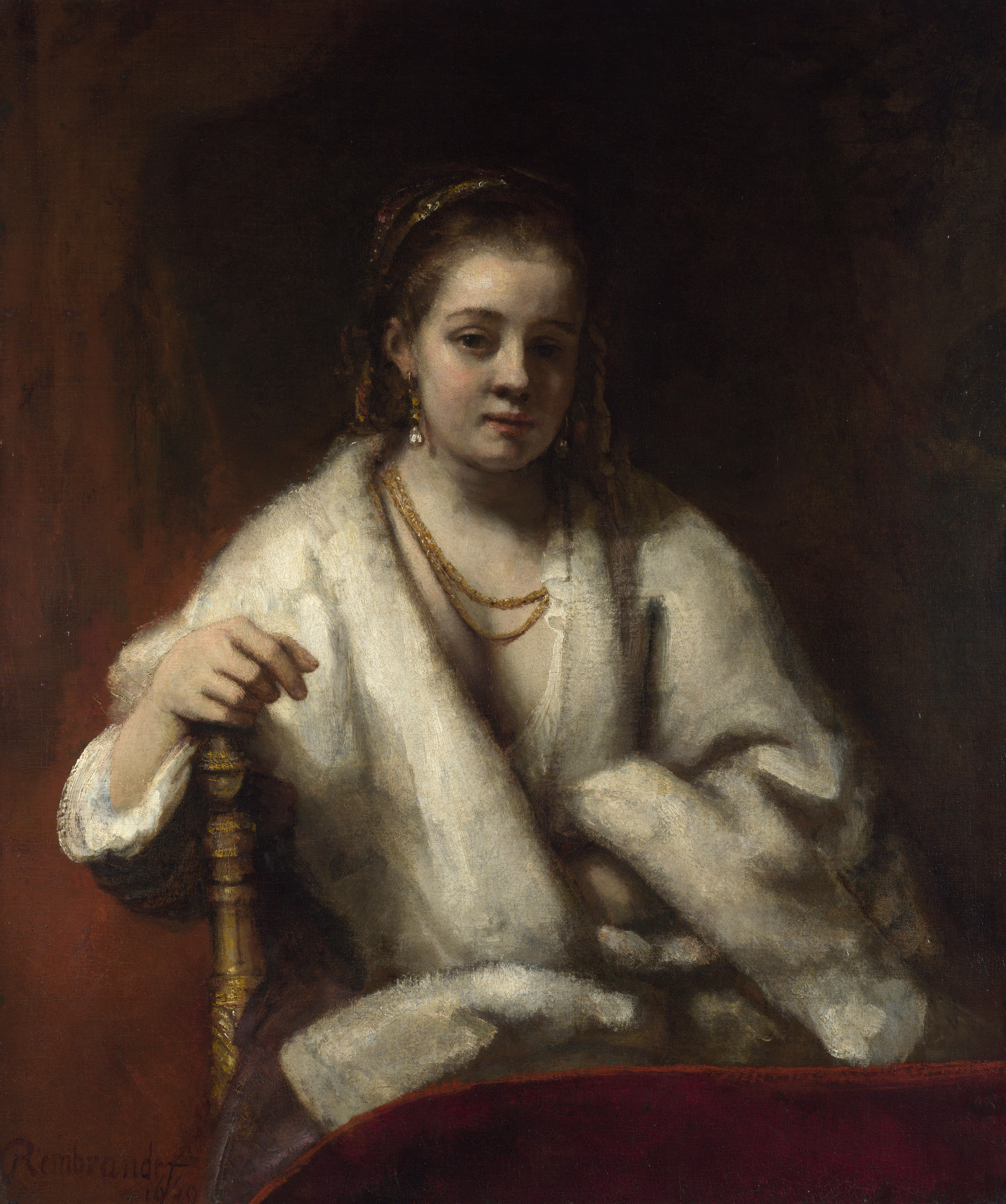
Portrait of Hendrickje Stoffels, c. 1654–1656, oil on canvas, 101.9 x 83.7 cm; National Gallery, London

Hendrickje Stoffels (1626 – 21 July 1663) was the longtime partner of Rembrandt. The couple were unable to marry because of the financial settlement linked to the will of Rembrandt's deceased wife Saskia, but they remained together until Hendrickje's death. In 1654 she gave birth to Rembrandt's daughter Cornelia. In the later years of their relationship Hendrickje managed Rembrandt's business affairs together with the painter's son Titus.

Hendrickje is widely believed to have modelled for several of Rembrandt's works and to be depicted in some Tronie portraits. However, her role as Rembrandt's model is disputed by some critics.

== Life ==
=== Youth ===
Hendrickje was born in the garrison city of Bredevoort, Gelderland, the daughter of sergeant Stoffel Stoffelse and Mechteld Lamberts. Sergeant Stoffel Stoffelse was Jager (hunter) for the castle at Bredevoort and so was also nicknamed Jeger, with his children nicknamed 'Jegers', but always officially referred to as 'Stoffels'.

Hendrickje had three brothers: Hermen, Berent and Frerick. Hermen and Berent were longtime soldiers in Bredevoort, never serving elsewhere. Berent and Frerick both died young. Hendrickje had a sister, Martijne Jegers, and perhaps also another, Margriete. Martijne married Jan Kerstens Pleckenpoel from Lichtenvoorde, who was another soldier in Bredevoort. After his death Martijne remarried, to Berent van Aelten.

Hendrickje's father almost certainly died in July 1646, the victim of an explosion of the gunpowder tower in Bredevoort. In January 1647, after the normal mourning time of half a year, his widow Mechteld Lamberts married a neighbour, Jacob van Dorsten, a widower with three young children. As a consequence of her mother's marriage, Hendrickje seems to have been constrained to leave home for Amsterdam.

=== Relationship with Rembrandt ===
Hendrickje obtained work as Rembrandt's housekeeper, and seems to have lived with him from approximately 1647, at first as a maid, but fast becoming much more. This led to an acrimonious fallout with Rembrandt's previous live-in lover Geertje Dircx, who sued Rembrandt for breach of promise in 1649, and demanded maintenance payments from him. Hendrickje testified in the case, confirming that a financial agreement had been reached with Geertje. In the same year Hendrickje returned to Bredevoort for the summer (possibly with Rembrandt accompanying her), and is there mentioned as a witness to a christening in the Bredevoorts church records. The Eighty Years' War was past, and peace was finally reaching even the eastern Netherlands.

In 1654, when she was pregnant with Rembrandt's daughter, Hendrickje had to appear before the Council of the Reformed Church for "living in sin" with Rembrandt, who was a widower and 20 years her senior. She admitted to "unwedded cohabitation" with Rembrandt and was banned from receiving communion. On 30 October 1654, the couple's daughter Cornelia van Rijn was baptized in the Oude Kerk in Amsterdam. Rembrandt and Hendrickje lived together as common law husband and wife until her death in 1663.

Initially, Rembrandt's unwillingness to marry Hendrickje had a pecuniary motive: by marrying her he would have forfeited the inheritance of his first wife Saskia van Uylenburgh. Even with this inheritance he had major financial problems, but without it he would have been bankrupt. But then in 1655, Titus – the son he had with Saskia – turned 14, and thereby eligible by law to make his will. Rembrandt immediately made sure that Titus installed him as his only heir and by that he outwitted Saskia. Still, he did not marry Hendrickje.

=== As Rembrandt's dealer ===
In 1656 Rembrandt “assigned” his share in the house to Titus just four weeks prior to the application for cessio bonorum. By February 1658, the house was sold at a foreclosure auction, and the family moved from Jodenbreestraat to more modest lodgings at Rozengracht. The authorities and his creditors were generally accommodating to Rembrandt but he could not sell anything without their knowledge. To get around this, Hendrickje and Titus set up a dummy corporation as art dealers in 1660, with Rembrandt who had board and lodging, to continue his artistic pursuits. In this way his Hendrickje Stoffels and Titus had become his employer – at least officially. Her biographer Christoph Driessen believes that Rembrandt’s noticeable productivity in the early 1660s was caused by the obvious support Hendrickje was rendering him. She was organizing his life for him and prevented his complete downfall after his bankruptcy.

In May 1663, the plague arrived in Amsterdam and killed thousands, especially at the end of the year. It is not clear Hendrickje was a victim of the epidemic as she was the only one who was buried in the Westerkerk in Amsterdam on 24 July 1663.

== In Rembrandt's art ==
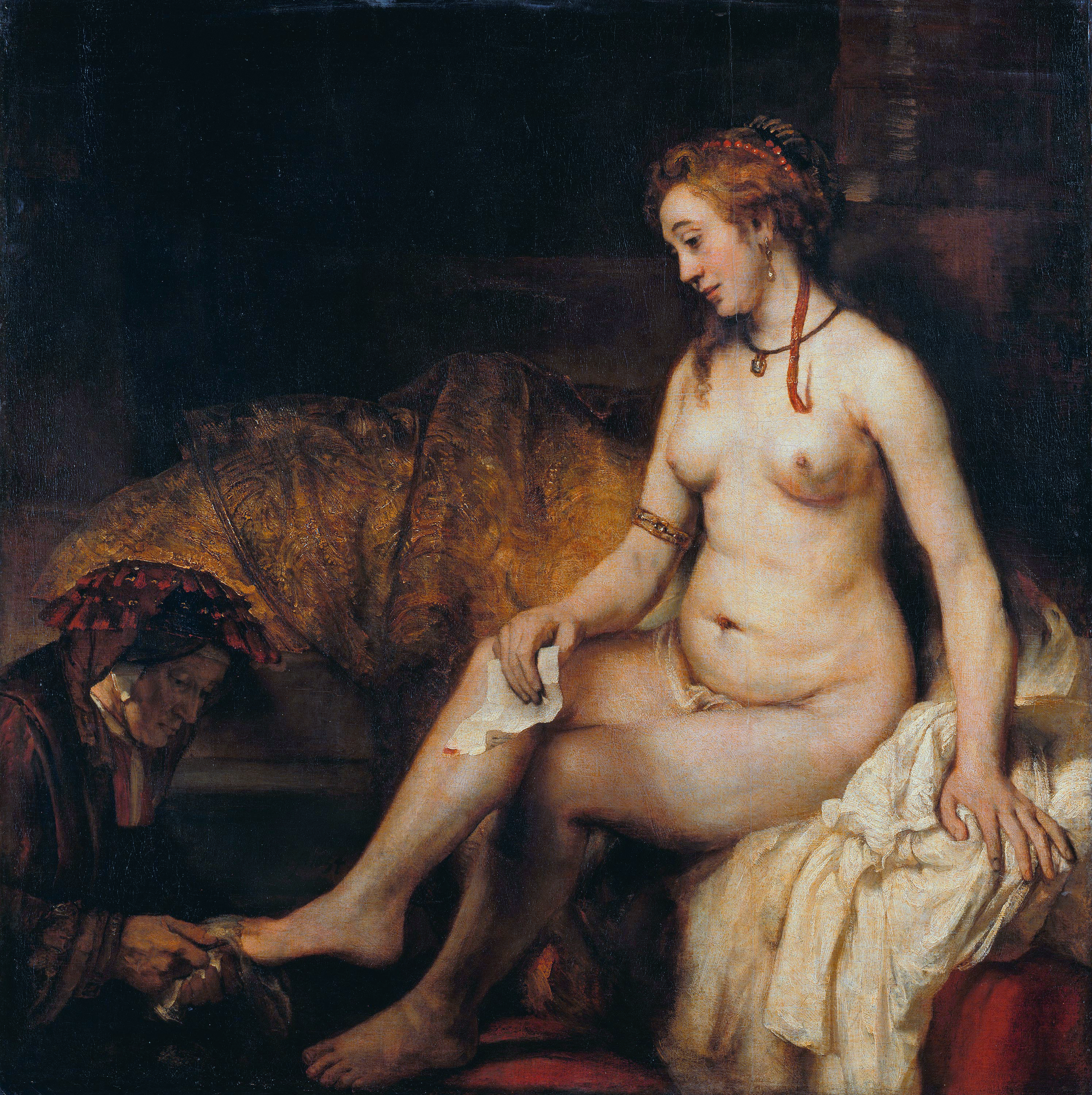
Hendrickje may have been a model for Bathsheba at Her Bath (1654).

Though there are no paintings that are explicitly identified as depictions of Hendrickje, there are a number of portraits, nudes and other images which appear to depict the same woman, who is often assumed to be Hendrickje. A portrait in the National Gallery, London is identified as her "based on the knowledge of the sitter's relationship with the artist, and the informality and affection with which she is represented." She is seated wearing a fur wrap and jewellery. There are a number of other portrait-like images that appear to depict the same woman. However, Rembrandt scholar Eric Sluijter is sceptical of attempts to identify Hendrickje in Rembrandt's work, writing that,

If one compares the large number of etchings, drawings and paintings with the purpose of recognizing Hendrickje it appears more often than not that there is little mutual resemblance between all the candidates. It is surprising how, still, in recent art historical literature numerous works are identified as Hendrickje Stoffels as a matter of course.

Sluijter suggests that the broad similarity between the faces of women in Rembrandt's paintings suggest that he tended to portray an "ideal type".

Hendrickje is also traditionally identified as the model for a number of nudes, especially the painting Bathsheba at Her Bath. She would have been 28 at the time of the painting. Sluijter has proposed otherwise, stating that Rembrandt would be very unlikely to portray his partner's own recognisable face on nudes to be sold publicly.

=== Hendrickje's appearance in paintings ===
While not confirmed, many historians and physicians have theorized Hendrickje may have had breast cancer or a similar condition. An Italian surgeon, T. Greco, theorized she may have breast cancer based on her appearance in the painting Bathsheba at Her Bath. Appearance such as the asymmetry, distended appearance, and peau d'orange on the left breast as well as swelling in and around the left armpit. After doing research into her life, Greco theorized her death could be caused by breast cancer.

The theory has been expected by both physicians and historians. The book, Bathsheba's breast: women, cancer & history, is named after this theory, but does not help confirm or deny the theory. Other theories have been suggested for Hendrickje's appearance, such as an abscess due to tuberculosis, mastitis, and improper restoration. One of the main points of contention of people who do not believe in the breast cancer theory is she lived for nine years after the painting was finished, which would be unlikely at the time without a mastectomy. Paolo Zamboni, a vascular surgeon, theorized the appearance could have been caused by thrombophlebitis or Mondor disease, which could cause the appearance of but would not be nearly as deadly as cancer.

== In later culture ==
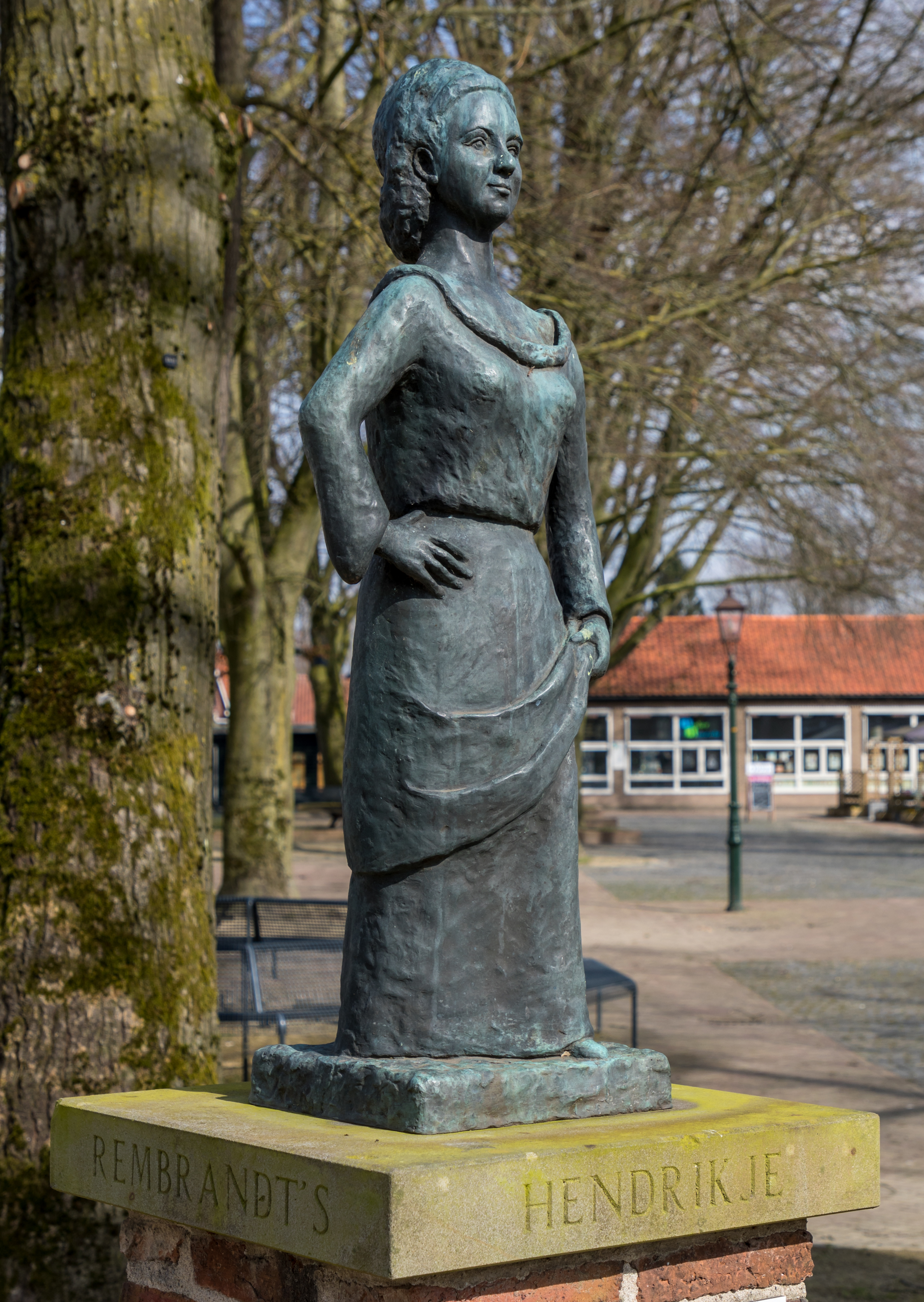
Statue of Hendrickje Stoffels at square 't Zand in Bredevoort

She appears in several films and television dramas about the life of Rembrandt. She is a character in the 1936 British film Rembrandt, where she is portrayed by Elsa Lanchester. Gisela Uhlen took the role in the 1942 German film Rembrandt. In the 1999 biopic Rembrandt she is played by Romane Bohringer. In Peter Greenaway's film Nightwatching, she is played by Emily Holmes.

In television she appears in Portrait by Rembrandt (1952), played by Jennifer Gray. Vera Veroft depicts her as the central character in the 1963 drama Hendrickje Stoffels. She also appears in the Dutch 2011 series Rembrandt en ik, played by Wendell Jaspers.

The novel I Am Rembrandt's Daughter is about Hendrickje's daughter Cornelia. Hendrickje appears in flashback scenes.

A LINT-24 train, run by the Dutch transportation firm Syntus, is named after her. In her birthplace, Bredevoort, a bronze statue has been erected of her in the town's square, known as 't Zand.

== Sources ==
- Driessen, C. (2012) Rembrandts vrouwen, Bert Bakker.
