= Nightwatching =

2007 film by Peter Greenaway

- Theatrical poster
- Directed by: Peter Greenaway
- Written by: Peter Greenaway
- Produced by: Kees Kasander
- Starring: Martin Freeman; Emily Holmes; Michael Teigen; Christopher Britton; Eva Birthistle; Jodhi May
- Cinematography: Reinier van Brummelen
- Edited by: Karen Porter
- Music by: Włodek Pawlik
- Distributed by: BAC Films (France); Axiom Films (United Kingdom); ContentFilm International (Overseas)
- Release date: September 6, 2007; (Venice Film Festival)
- Running time: 134 minutes
- Countries: Canada; France; Germany; Poland; Netherlands; United Kingdom
- Language: English

Nightwatching is a 2007 film about the artist Rembrandt and the creation of his 1642 painting The Night Watch. The film is directed by Peter Greenaway and stars Martin Freeman as Rembrandt, with Eva Birthistle as his wife Saskia van Uylenburg, Jodhi May as his lover Geertje Dircx, and Emily Holmes as his other lover Hendrickje Stoffels. Reinier van Brummelen is the director of photography. James Willcock, known for his esoteric sets, is the art director.

The film is described by co-producer Jean Labadie as "a return to the Greenaway of The Draughtsman's Contract." It features Greenaway's trademark neoclassical compositions and graphic sexuality. The original music is by Włodek Pawlik, while the film also makes prominent use of existing compositions by Giovanni Sollima, whose music Greenaway had also used through The Tulse Luper Suitcases. The film premiered in competition, at the Venice Film Festival.

Nightwatching is the first feature in Greenaway's film series "Dutch Masters", and was followed by Goltzius and the Pelican Company.

An associated work by the same director is the documentary film Rembrandt's J'Accuse (2008), in which Greenaway addresses 34 "mysteries" associated with the painting, illustrated by scenes from the drama.

== Plot ==
The Night Watch by Rembrandt, the subject of the film

The film is centred on the creation of The Night Watch, Rembrandt's most famous work, depicting civilian militiamen who wanted to be celebrated in a group portrait. The film posits a conspiracy to murder within the musketeer regiment of Frans Banninck Cocq and Willem van Ruytenburch, and suggests that Rembrandt may have immortalized a conspiracy theory using subtle allegory in his group portrait of the regiment, subverting what was to have been a highly prestigious commission for both painter and subject.

The film also depicts Rembrandt's personal life, and suggests he suffered serious consequences in later life as a result of the accusation contained in his most famous painting.

== Cast ==
- Martin Freeman as Rembrandt
- Eva Birthistle as Saskia van Uylenburg
- Jodhi May as Geertje Dircx
- Emily Holmes as Hendrickje Stoffels
- Toby Jones as Gerard Dou
- Michael Teigen as Carel Fabritius
- Agata Buzek as Titia Uylenburgh
- Natalie Press as Marieke
- Fiona O'Shaughnessy as Marita
- Adrian Lukis as Frans Banninck Cocq
- Michael Culkin as Herman Wormskerck
- Christopher Britton as Rombout Kemp
- Reimer van Beek as Titus (newborn)
- Maciej Zakościelny as Egremont

== Release and reception ==
The film was released in seven countries between January and August 2008, and grossed US$698,544, of which US$480,704 was earned in France.

It was well-received as a return to form for the director by critics, who singled out the film's look and Freeman's performance for praise. On the review aggregator website Rotten Tomatoes, 74% of 19 critics' reviews are positive. In The Times, Kevin Maher hailed it as a "muscular return to form" for the director, praising its rich visual texture and engaging plot, and Freeman in the central role as a "revelation". TotalFilm's Kate Stables similarly praised Greenaway's "exhilarating and exquisite use of colour and light," and found Freeman "riveting". The Guardian's Peter Bradshaw complimented the "fiercely intelligent performances" of Freeman and Birthistle. In Empire, Adam Smith welcomed the "ravishing" visuals and Freeman's "outstanding" work. For Little White Lies, Matt Bocheski characterised it as a noble exploration of Rembrandt's inner life, but lamented what he saw as its "stupefying dullness". Variety's Jay Weissberg praised the acting, use of colour and production design, despite finding it unfocused. In the Toronto Star Peter Howell characterised Greenaway as "[m]ore art director than film director", who "refuses to stitch together anything resembling a coherent storyline" but conceded that the film's visuals were "above reproach".
