= Portrait of Hendrickje Stoffels =

1654-1656 painting by Rembrandt

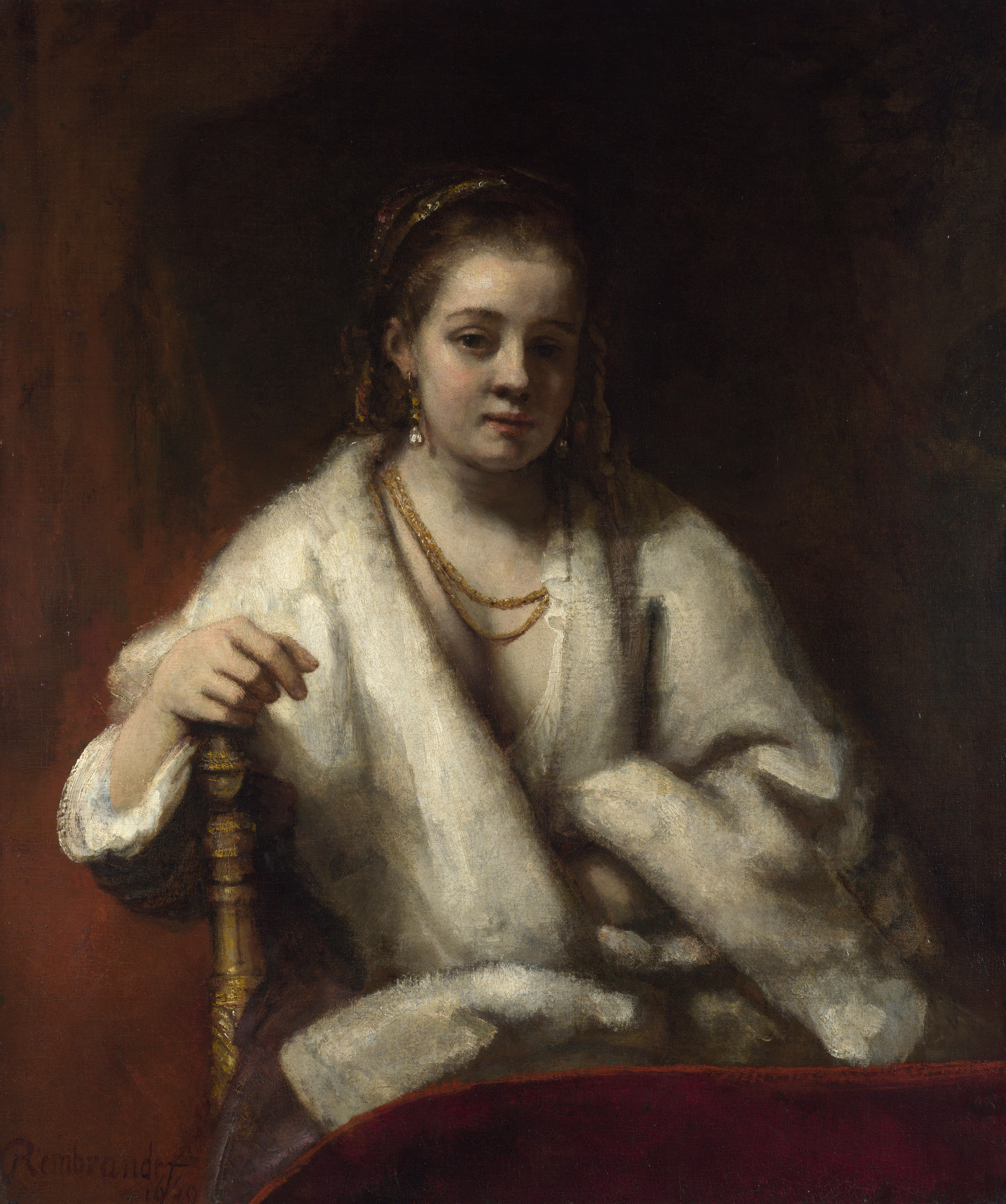
- Artist: Rembrandt
- Year: 1654–1656
- Medium: oil on canvas
- Dimensions: 101.9 cm × 83.7 cm (40.1 in × 33.0 in)
- Location: National Gallery, London

Portrait of Hendrickje Stoffels is an oil on canvas painting by the Dutch golden age artist Rembrandt Van Rijn. The painting is a portrait of Rembrandt's housekeeper Hendrickje Stoffels who was also Rembrandt's mistress and mother of his daughter. In the portrait she is sitting on a chair, wearing a fur mantle and expensive jewellery. Her chemise is open loosely over her bosom, as she rests her right arm on the top of the chair.

== History ==
The painting was made between 1654 and 1656, just 7 to 9 years after she and Rembrandt met in 1647. This is also one of several paintings where the subject of the painting is believed to be Hendrickje Stoffels as there is no universally agreed painting which shows her.

The painting was acquired by the National Gallery in 1976, after a £10,000 contribution from the Art Fund. At the time the painting was said to be valued at £1 million, which as of 2026 would be equivalent of £6.8 million, allowing for inflation. The previous owner, Mary Dent-Brocklehurst (née Morrison), said that she did not receive this amount of money, after deduction of inheritance and capital gains taxation. She acquired the painting in 1968 after the death of her brother, Simon Morrison. The painting was originally purchased by their great-grandfather, James Morrison, in 1838, from the estate of Edward Gray (1751–1838), and was part of the Morrison family trust. Gray, a merchant, had bought the painting in Amsterdam in 1817. The painting had been stored in a bank vault for several years before the National Gallery acquired it.

The Times put the news of the National Gallery's acquisition on the front page, with Geraldine Norman describing the work as a great portrait of the artist's mistress and probably the National Gallery's most significant acquisition since the Death of Actaeon by Titian in 1971.

The National Gallery received the painting covered by a heavy layer of varnish, which was removed before the painting was put on public display. Richard Cork of the Evening Standard wrote that despite the varnish, it was immediately obvious that the painting was one of Rembrandt's most personal and successful mature paintings.

== See also ==
- List of paintings by Rembrandt
