= Geertje Dircx =

Mistress of Rembrandt van Rijn

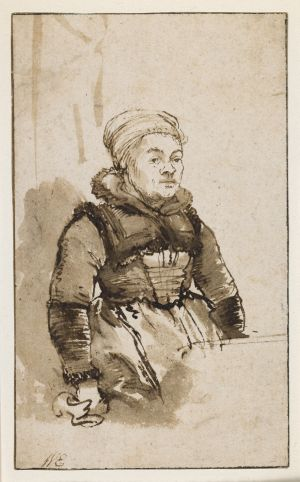
This drawing by Rembrandt is believed to depict Geertje Dircx.

Geertje Dircx (Dutch pronunciation: [ˈɣeːrtɕə ˈdɪr(ə)ks]; c. 1610–1615 – c. 1656) was the lover of Rembrandt van Rijn after the death of his wife Saskia. She was hired as a nurse to the painter's son Titus, but lived with Rembrandt as his lover for several years. The relationship broke up acrimoniously, leading to a lengthy court-case for "breach of promise" (a euphemism for seduction under [breached] promise to marry), in which she claimed maintenance from Rembrandt. On Rembrandt's initiative, she was eventually imprisoned in a workhouse on charges of having descended into a life of loose morals. After her release she made attempts to sue Rembrandt for wrongful imprisonment.

She may be the model for a number of Rembrandt's works, but there is disagreement about which images depict her.

== Life ==
=== In Rembrandt's service ===
Geertje was born in Edam. Between 1630 and 1640, she worked in an inn in Hoorn. At some point she was married to Abraham Claesz, who was 32, a trumpeter of the Navy of the Dutch West India Company, but her husband died at sea. After that she lodged with her brother Pieter, a ship's carpenter in Waterland. It was possibly through him that she got to know Rembrandt.

She entered Rembrandt's service in around 1643, as a childless widow. She lived with Rembrandt for six years in the Sint Antoniesbreestraat and nursed his son Titus. During this time she and Rembrandt apparently entered into a relationship, an arrangement which was not uncommon. He gave her a number of rings that had belonged to his deceased wife, Saskia van Uylenburgh, a gesture not much appreciated by Saskia's family. A few years later Geertje expected Rembrandt to marry her, but such an arrangement would have resulted in his losing an inheritance from Saskia.

=== Legal proceedings ===
In May 1649 she and Rembrandt quarreled, probably as a consequence of Rembrandt's new relationship with his housekeeper Hendrickje Stoffels. The couple separated and Rembrandt came to an agreement with Geertje that he would pay her 160 guilders, plus an annual stipend of 60 guilders for the rest of her life, as long as she did not change her will which named Titus as her heir. In June, Geertje rented a room above a seamens' bar on Rapenburg. By October, Geertje had requested additional support from Rembrandt, having pawned a diamond ring given to her by Rembrandt to maintain her livelihood. Although he was not legally required to do so, Rembrandt paid her 200 guilders to redeem the jewellery and agreed to increase her stipend to 160 guilders a year, on the continued condition that she would not change her will.

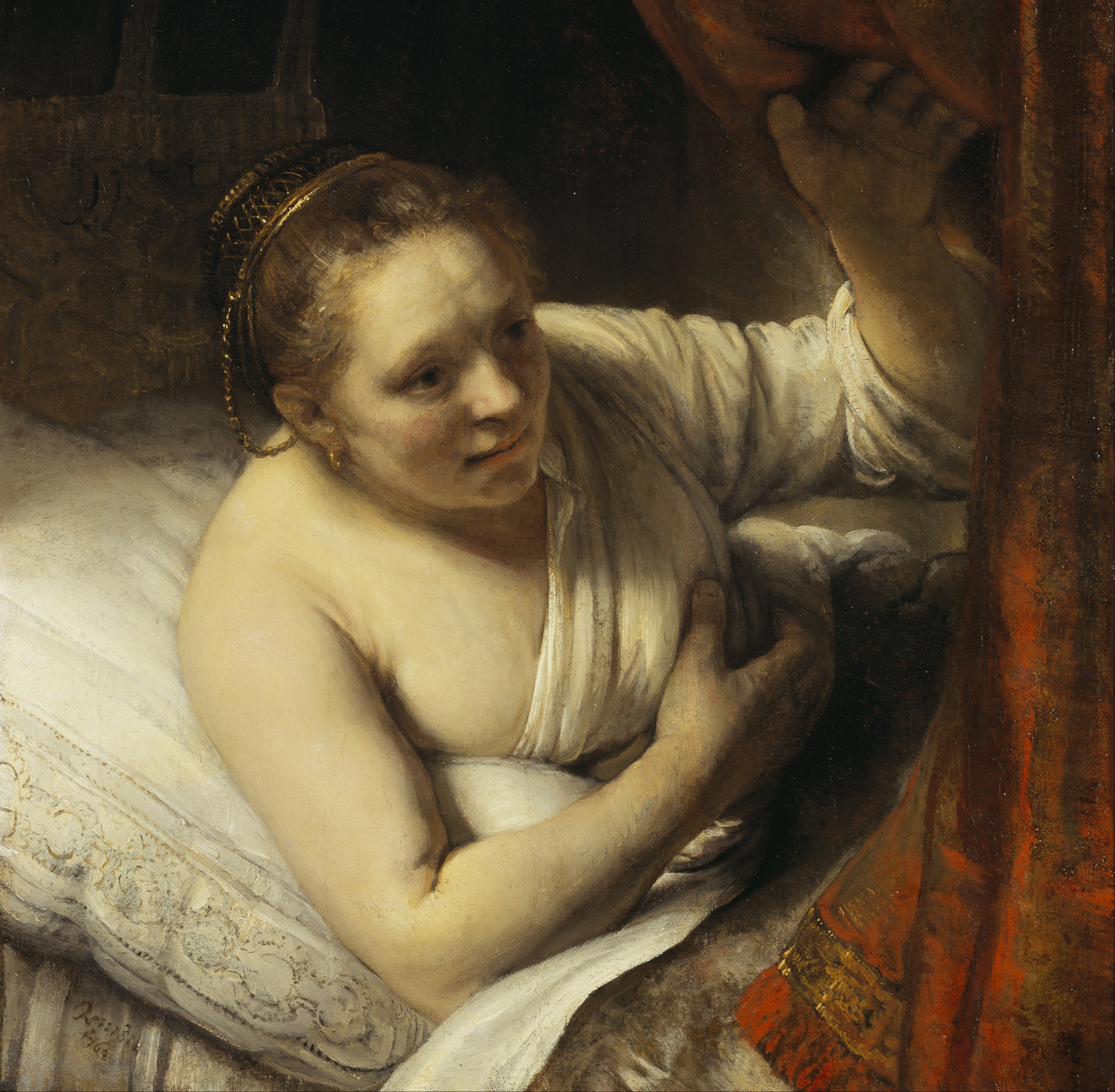
A Woman in Bed (1645). National Gallery of Scotland, Edinburgh. According to Gary Schwartz, the woman in the picture could be Geertghe Dircx.

Geertje, however, refused to accept this settlement, claiming that it would not cover her expenses if she became seriously ill or infirm. When Geertje came to sign the agreement with Rembrandt in the presence of a notary, she refused to sign to the agreement. She summoned Rembrandt before the Commissioners of Marital Affairs on a charge of breach of promise and took his gifts such as a diamond ring to a pawnbroker's to fund the case. The commissioners raised the annual sum to 200 guilders. The court particularly stated that Rembrandt had to pay a maintenance allowance, provided that Titus remained her only heir and she sold none of Rembrandt's possessions.

However, Geertje continued to demand money from Rembrandt, possibly to the point of blackmail. In the summer of 1650, Rembrandt participated in an effort to have Geertje sent to the "spinhuis" in Gouda, a women's house of correction, sometimes referred to as an insane asylum. Historian Patrick Hunt describes it as "virtual prison for destitute and diseased prostitutes as well as an asylum for the mentally unhinged. Geertje probably lived up to the latter requisite by ranting and raving 'most vehemently'". Historians have had differing views about the facts behind this dispute. It seems that her brother and nephew, along with a number of Geertje's neighbours, supported some of Rembrandt's claims against her. She was condemned to twelve years' confinement. In 1652 she petitioned for her release, but was refused. In 1655 she became ill. A friend of hers named Trijn Jacobs eventually managed to persuade the council to intervene on her behalf and Geertje was freed from prison, having been confined for five years.

After her release she prepared a complaint against Rembrandt for wrongful imprisonment on grounds of slander and false testimonies. According to Christoph Driessen, “[t]he audacity and tenaciousness she showed to fight the highly respected and established Rembrandt command one’s admiration”. Rembrandt filed a counter-suit and secured an order that her brother Peter must not leave the Netherlands as he was required as a witness (he was intending to work as a carpenter on board a ship bound for India). On 8 August 1656 Geertje is listed as one of Rembrandt's seven major creditors. She probably died shortly after this.

Rembrandt's financial situation had deteriorated seriously during this period, and Geertje's new demands may have been the "final straw" that led to his filing for bankruptcy.

== Dramatic and literary portrayals ==
In the 1936 film Rembrandt by Alexander Korda, she is depicted as a highly unpleasant, shrewish and conniving woman. She is portrayed by Gertrude Lawrence, making one of her very rare film appearances. She also appears in Peter Greenaway's 2007 film Nightwatching, played by Jodhi May. Again she is portrayed negatively, as a spy hired by conspirators to discredit Rembrandt. She also appears in the 1942 German film Rembrandt played by Elisabeth Flickenschildt.

In television she is depicted by Jenny Tanghe in the drama Hendrickje Stoffels (1963), by Caroline van Houten in Rembrandt (1999) and by Marieke Heebink in the Dutch 2011 series Rembrandt en ik.

In literature author Simone van der Vlugt sets out to rehabilitate Geertje's reputation offering a surprising perspective in her 2019 historical novel Schilderslief.

In 2025 a historical novel, "Rembrandt's Promise" by Barbara Leahy was published. It centres on the relationship between Rembrandt and Geertje Dircx.

== Sources ==
- (in Dutch) Schwartz, G. (1987) Rembrandt, zijn leven, zijn schilderijen. Een nieuwe biografie met alle beschikbare schilderijen in kleur afgebeeld, p. 240-1.
- (in Dutch) Vis, D. (1965) Rembrandt en Geertje Dircx.
- (in Dutch) Wijnman, H. F. (1968) EEN EPISODE UIT HET LEVEN VAN REMBRANDT: DE GESCHIEDENIS VAN GEERTJE DIRCKS, Jaarboek Amstelodamum, p. 106-19.
