= 461 Saskia =

Main-belt asteroid

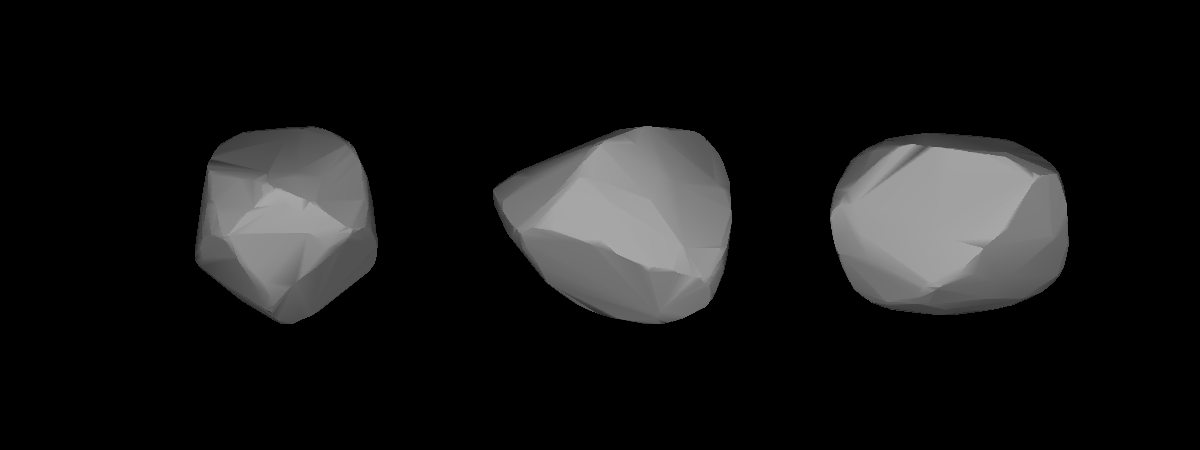
- Lightcurve-base 3D-model of 461 Saskia.

Discovery
- Discovered by: M. F. Wolf
- Discovery site: Heidelberg Obs.
- Discovery date: 22 October 1900

Designations
- Pronunciation: German: [ˈzaski.aː]
- Named after: Saskia van Uylenburgh (wife of Rembrandt)
- Alternative designations: 1900 FP · 1935 CT; A917 XE · A924 DB
- Minor planet category: main-belt · (outer); Themis

Orbital characteristics
- Epoch 23 March 2018 (JD 2458200.5)
- Uncertainty parameter 0
- Observation arc: 117.58 yr (42,946 d)
- Aphelion: 3.5621 AU
- Perihelion: 2.6834 AU
- Semi-major axis: 3.1227 AU
- Eccentricity: 0.1407
- Orbital period (sidereal): 5.52 yr (2,016 d)
- Mean anomaly: 71.934°
- Mean motion: 0° 10^{m} 42.96^{s} / day
- Inclination: 1.4634°
- Longitude of ascending node: 157.03°
- Argument of perihelion: 305.17°

Physical characteristics
- Mean diameter: 39.81±13.20 km 43.10±1.05 km 43.603±0.256 km 44.1±4.4 km
- Synodic rotation period: 7.348 h
- Geometric albedo: 0.06; 0.069; 0.112
- Spectral type: Tholen = FCX; X (S3OS2); B–V = 0.610±028; U–B = 0.310±014
- Absolute magnitude (H): 10.48; 10.63

461 Saskia, provisional designation 1900 FP, is a Themistian asteroid from the outer regions of the asteroid belt, approximately 44 kilometers (27 miles) in diameter. It was discovered on 22 October 1900, by German astronomer Max Wolf at the Heidelberg Observatory in southwest Germany. The X-type asteroid has a rotation period of 7.3 hours. It was named after Rembrandt's wife, Saskia van Uylenburgh.

== Orbit and classification ==
Saskia is a core member of the carbonaceous Themis family (602), one of the largest asteroid families named after 24 Themis. It orbits the Sun in the outer asteroid belt at a distance of 2.7–3.6 AU once every 5 years and 6 months (2,016 days; semi-major axis of 3.12 AU). Its orbit has an eccentricity of 0.14 and an inclination of 1° with respect to the ecliptic. The body's observation arc begins at Heidelberg the night after its official discovery observation.

== Naming ==
This minor planet was named after Saskia van Uylenburgh (1612–1642), wife of renowned Dutch painter Rembrandt (4511 Rembrandt). The official naming citation was mentioned in The Names of the Minor Planets by Paul Herget in 1955 (H 50).

== Physical characteristics ==
In the Tholen classification, this asteroid's spectral type is ambiguous, closest to a dark F-type asteroid, and somewhat similar to that of a C- and X-type (FCX), while in both the Tholen- and SMASS-like taxonomy of the Small Solar System Objects Spectroscopic Survey (S3OS2), Saskia is an X-type asteroid. It has also been characterized as a primitive P-type asteroid by the Wide-field Infrared Survey Explorer (WISE).

=== Rotation period ===
In April 2007, a rotational lightcurve of Saskia was obtained from photometric observations by French amateur astronomer Pierre Antonini. Lightcurve analysis gave a well-defined rotation period of 7.348±0.001 hours with a brightness variation of 0.36 magnitude (U=3). In December 2016, an identical period with an amplitude of 0.28 magnitude was determined by Daniel Klinglesmith at Etscorn Campus Observatory (719), New Mexico (U=3-). This result supersedes two previous observations that gave a period of 7.34 and 7.349 hours, respectively (U=2/3-).

=== Diameter and albedo ===
According to the survey carried out by the NEOWISE mission of NASA's WISE telescope, Saskia measures between 39.8 and 44.1 kilometers in diameter and its surface has an albedo between 0.06 and 0.112, while the Japanese Akari satellite determined a diameter of 43.10 kilometers with an albedo of 0.069. The Collaborative Asteroid Lightcurve Link assumes an albedo of 0.10 and derives a smaller diameter of 33.69 kilometers based on an absolute magnitude of 10.48.
