= Westerkerk =

Church in Amsterdam

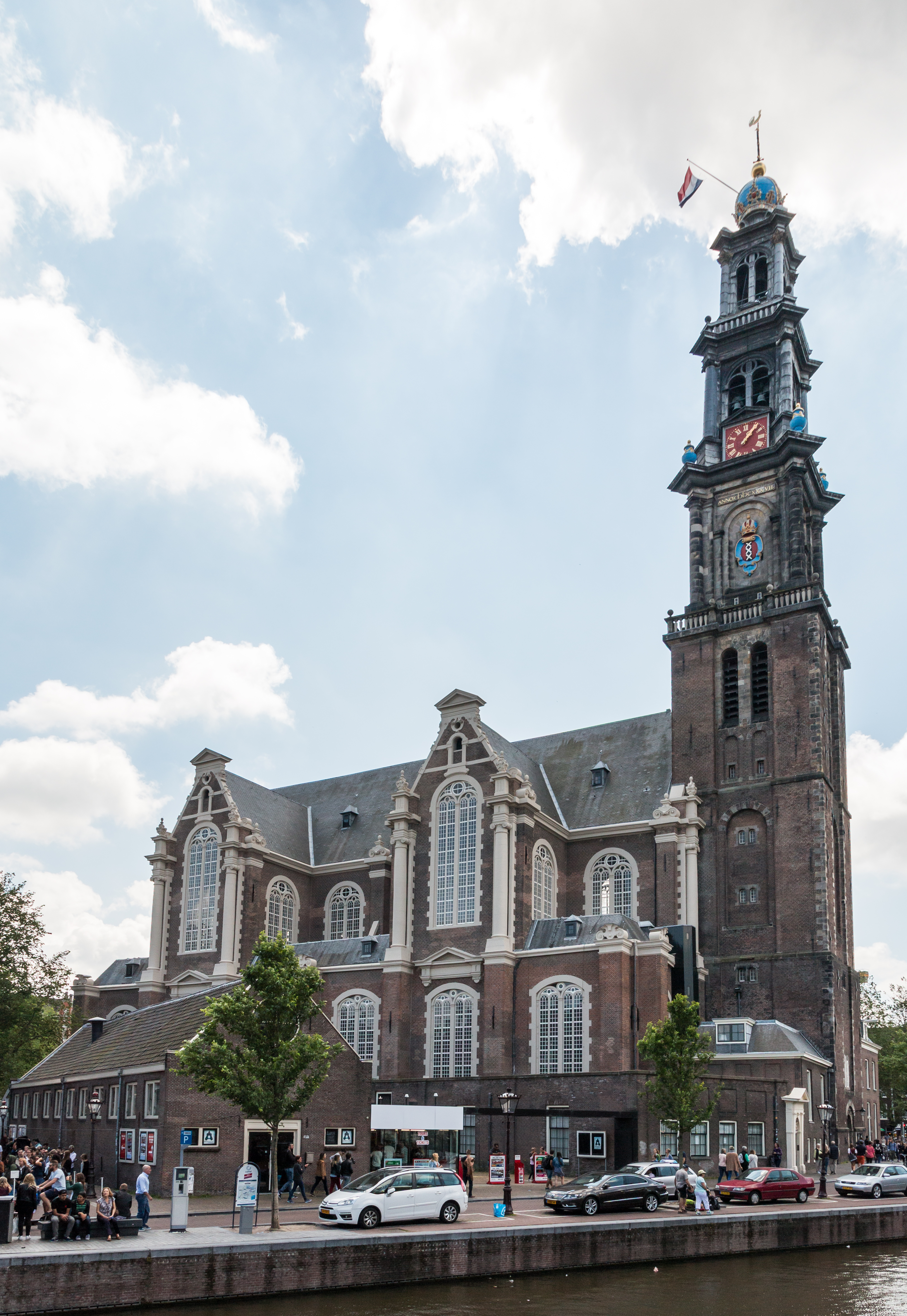
- The Westerkerk in 2015

Religion
- Affiliation: Protestant Church in the Netherlands
- Rite: Calvinist
- Ecclesiastical or organisational status: Parish church

Location
- Location: Prinsengracht 281, Amsterdam, Netherlands
- Interactive map of Westerkerk
- Coordinates: 52°22′28″N 4°53′1″E

Architecture
- Architect: Hendrick de Keyser
- Style: Dutch Renaissance
- Groundbreaking: 1620
- Completed: 1631

Website
- www.westerkerk.nl

The Westerkerk (Dutch pronunciation: [ˈʋɛstərˌkɛr(ə)k]; English: Western Church) is a Reformed church within Dutch Protestant Calvinism in central Amsterdam, Netherlands. It lies in the most western part of the Grachtengordel neighborhood (Centrum borough), next to the Jordaan, between the Prinsengracht and Keizersgracht.

== History ==
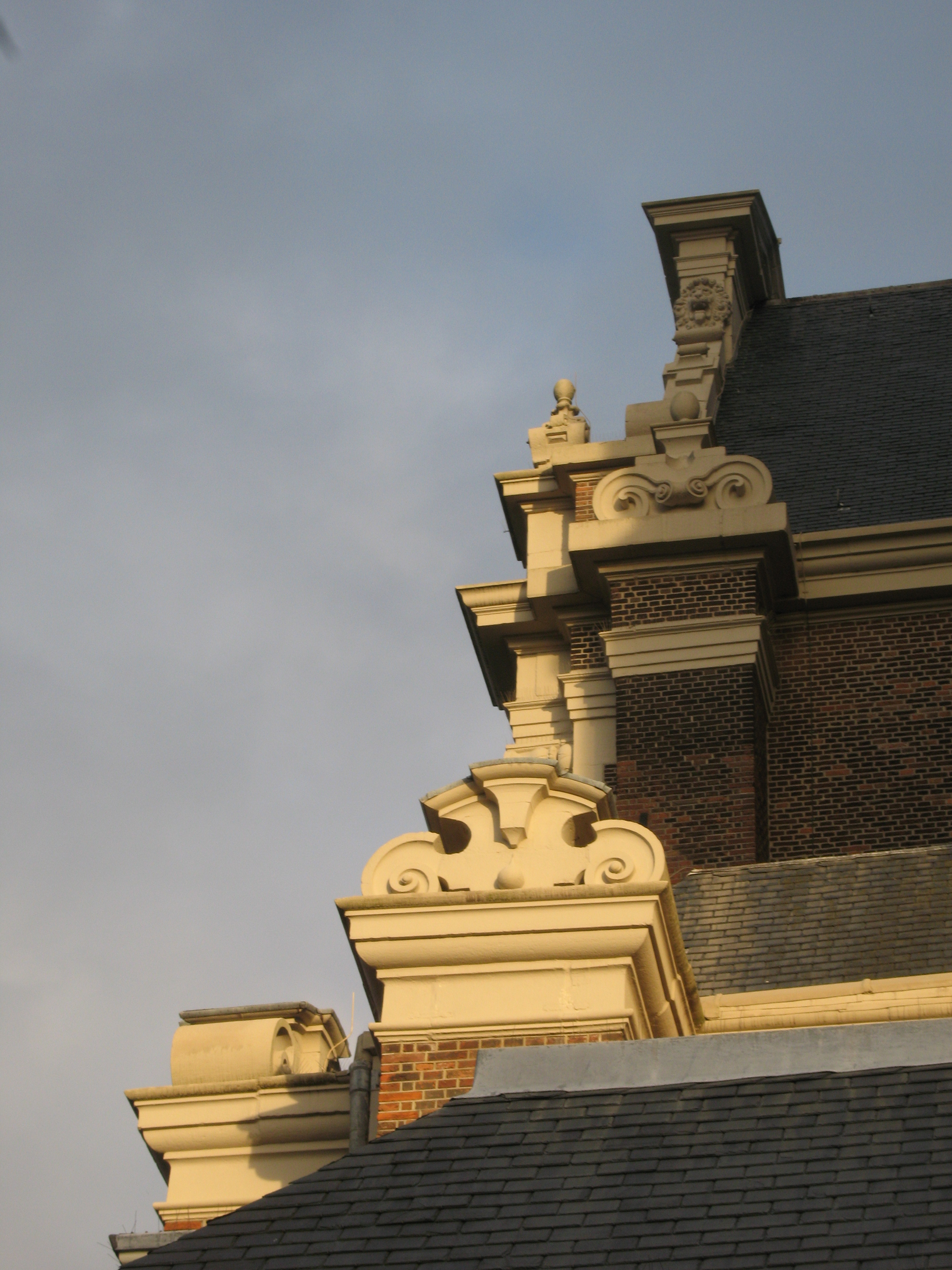
Fantasy ornaments on roof top of Westerkerk

The Westerkerk was built between 1620 and 1631 in Renaissance style according to designs by architect Hendrick de Keyser. The building of the Westerkerk was finished and completed by his son Pieter de Keyser and inaugurated on June 8, 1631. The church has a length of 58 metres (190 ft) and a width of 29 metres (95 ft). The high nave is flanked by the two lower aisles. The three-aisled basilica has a rectangular plan with two transepts of equal dimensions. As a result, the plan for this church was given the form of two Greek crosses connected with each other (a patriarchal cross).

Several older churches in Amsterdam, such as the Oude Kerk and Nieuwe Kerk, were originally built before the Reformation and were converted to Protestantism during the Reformation in 1578. The Westerkerk was one of the first purpose-built Protestant churches. It remains the largest church in the Netherlands that was built for Protestants, and is still in use by the Protestant Church in the Netherlands.

== Main Duyschot organ ==
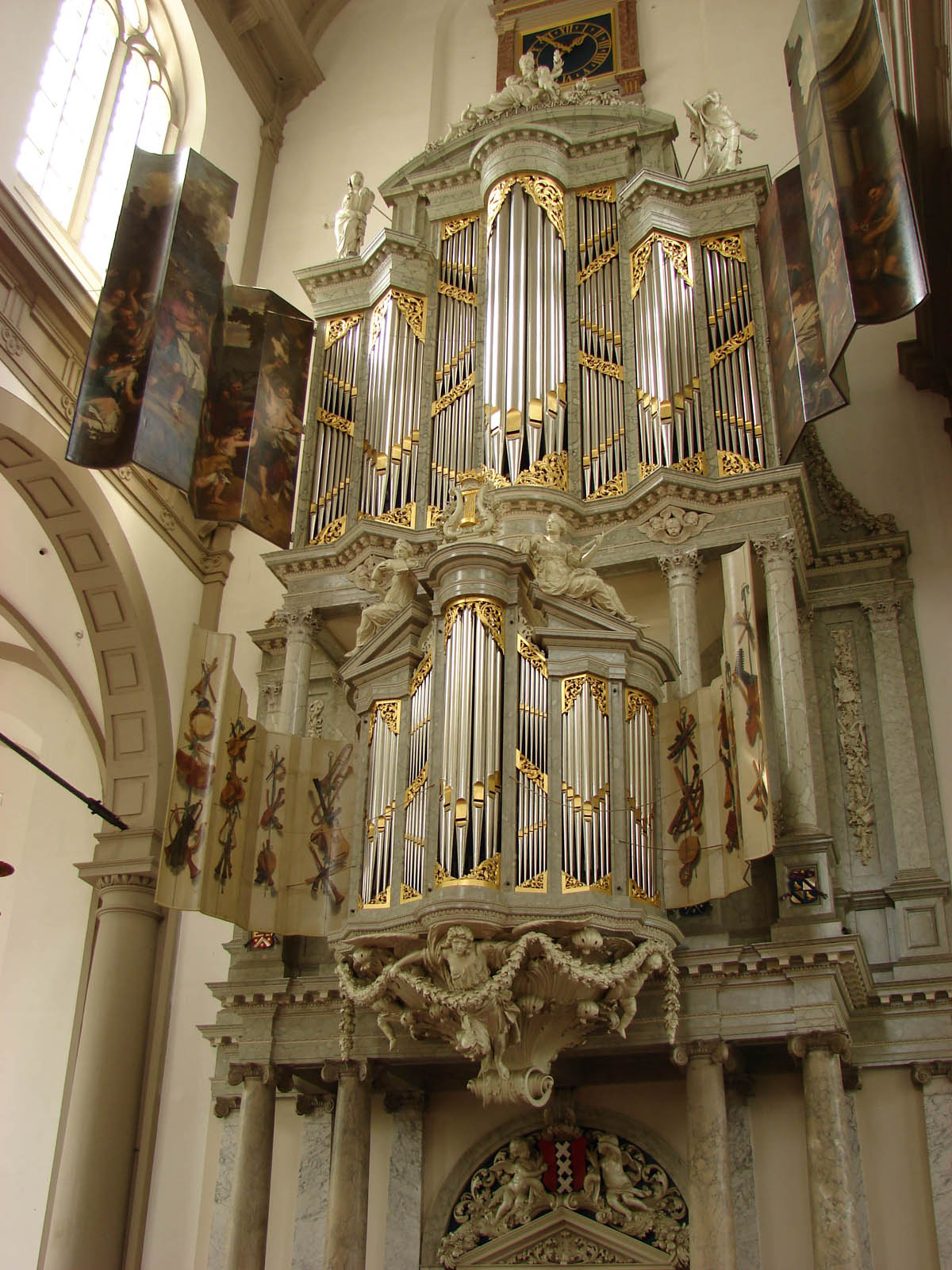
Duyschot organ Westerkerk Amsterdam

There was no organ when the Westerkerk was consecrated on Pentecost Sunday, June 8, 1631, in accordance with Calvinistic belief at that time instrumental music in the church was considered profane. It took many years of deliberation until an organ was finally allowed. At first there was still talk of moving the small organ (koororgel) used in the Nieuwe Kerk or the Oude Kerk, but the pipes of the Oude Kerk choir organ were finally moved to the Zuiderkerk. In 1681 the Westerkerk decided to commission the organ builder Roelof Barentszn Duyschot for the construction of a new organ. Roelof Barentszn Duyschot died before the organ was completed. His son finished the commission in 1686. Later, in 1727, the console was enlarged with a third manuel by Christiaan Vater, who learned his profession through Arp Schnitger.

Many alterations were done on the organ in the course of time. In the 19th century in 1895 a rebuild of the inside of the organ took place by Daniel Gerard Steenkuyl. Many of the old pipes and the wind chests were re-used. In 1939, the keyboard was equipped with electric tracker action and a swell work was added. It was not what this organ was intended to be in sound and action. The organ was almost doubled in size, but was also too big for its case.

So between 1989 and 1992 the organ was reconstructed by Flentrop organ builders in Zaandam to its former mechanical action, again more or less like Christiaan Vater made it in 1727. Today the bovenwerk (Oberwerk, located in the top of the organ case) is still almost complete, with stops by Vater. An exception is the baarpyp, which is made by Steenkuyl in 1896 and the Dulciaan which is made by Flentrop in 1992. The front pipes were made in 1842 by Hermanus Knipscheer. The situation after 1992 was that less than half of the pipes are historic and re-used in the hoofdwerk (great organ) and the Rugwerk (choir organ). The manuals and stop triggers beside this mechanical baroque organ are located in the main case behind this rugwerk. For this kind of baroque organs, it is characteristic that many of the stops, mainly the principals, are doubled in the trebles. This was set up to create more power in leading the congregation in their psalm singing. For complex organ works one or even two stop assistants are necessary for triggering the stops. During the restoration of the inside of the church between 2018 and 2020, the inside of the organ was taken to Zaandam at Flentrop Orgelbouw for cleaning and partly revoicing the sound. In the spring of 2020 it was returned to the church. On 18 April the new organist Evan Bogerd performed the commissioning concert on the internet; the church was closed to visitors because of the coronavirus pandemic.

From April till the end of October, there is a free weekly lunchtime concert on Fridays or Saturdays at 1pm. In August there are free concerts almost every day for a week 'Geen dag zonder Bach' ('Not a day without Bach') and the Grachten (Canal) festival. A voluntary donation is asked at the end of the concert upon leaving the church. Music by Johann Sebastian Bach (1685–1750) is performed almost weekly at the services of divine worship on Sundays.

The organist titulaire in the Westerkerk is Evan Bogerd.

== Stoplist of the Duyschot organ ==
I Rugwerk (Chaire organ) CDE–d^{3} Prestant 8′ Td Holpijp 8′ Td Quintadeen 8′ Octaaf 4′ Td Open Fluit 4′ Td Superoctaaf 2′ Td Sifflet 1′ Td Sexquialter II-III ranks Mixtuur III-VIII ranks Scherp III-VIII ranks Scherp IV ranks treble Trompet 8′ Tremulant	II Hoofdwerk (Great organ) C–d^{3} Prestant 16' Td Prestant 8' Td Quintadeen 8' Octaaf 4' Td Nasard 3' Td Superoctaaf 2' Td Mixtuur III-VII ranks bass/treble Scherp IV-VII ranks bass/treble Sexquialter III-IV ranks treble Fagot 16' Trompet 8'	III Bovenwerk (Oberwerk organ) C–d^{3} Prestant 8′ Td Baarpijp 8′ Quintadeen 8′ Octaaf 4′ Td Holfluit 4′ Quint 3′ Td Woudfluit 2' Td Tertiaan II-III ranks Ruispijp III-VI ranks Dulciaan 8′ Vox Humana 8′ Tremulant	Pedals C–d^{1} Bourdon 16′ Prestant 8′ Roerquint 6′ Octaaf 4′ Bazuin 16′ Trompet 8′ Trompet 4′

Couplers and shutters:

- Shutters for all manuals and pedals.
- Couplers: I/II, II/I, III/II, I/P, II/P, III/P
- Td = Treble is doubled

== The paintings of the organ ==
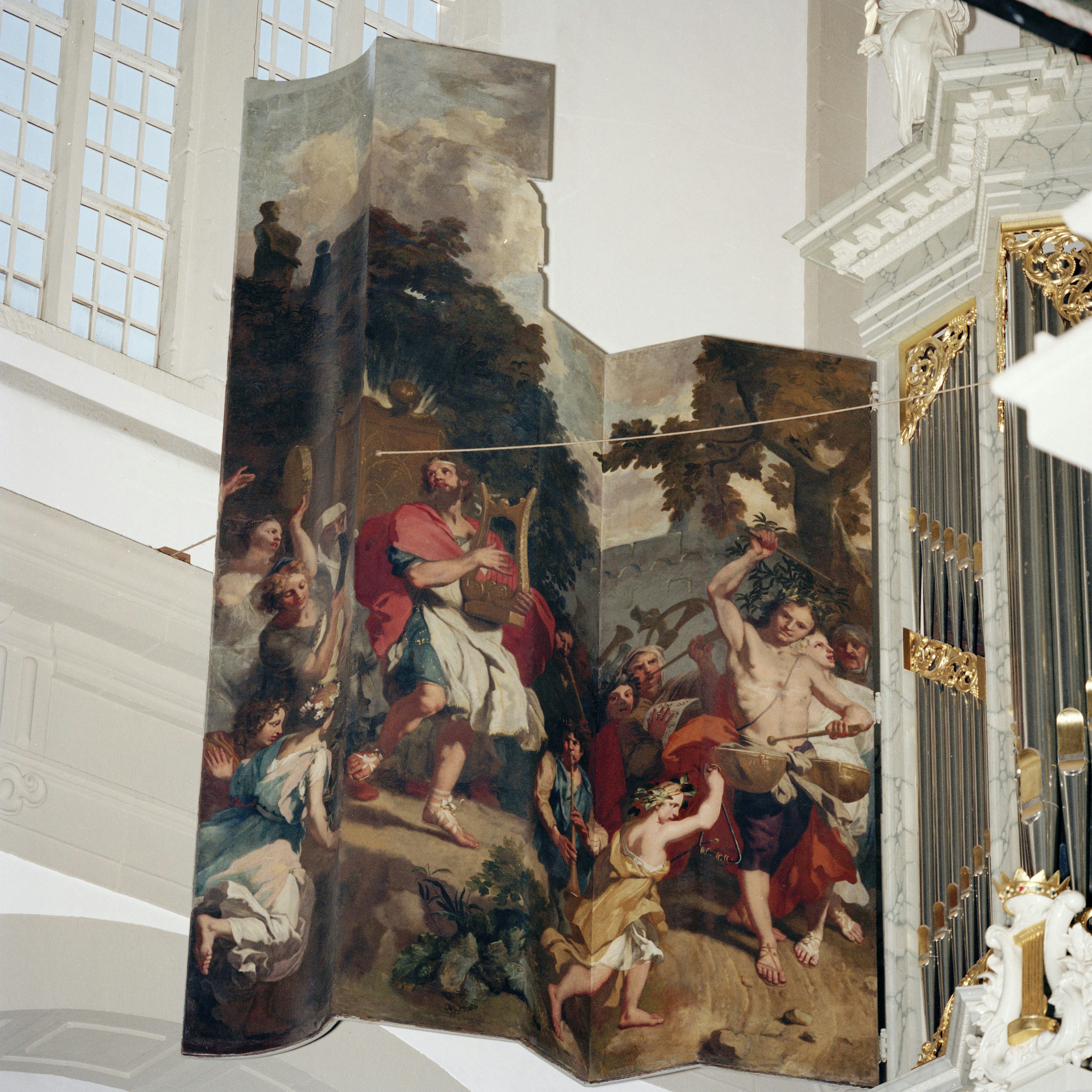
Left inside panel of the main organ with King David dancing in front of the Ark of the Covenant'. Made by Gerard de Lairesse in 1686

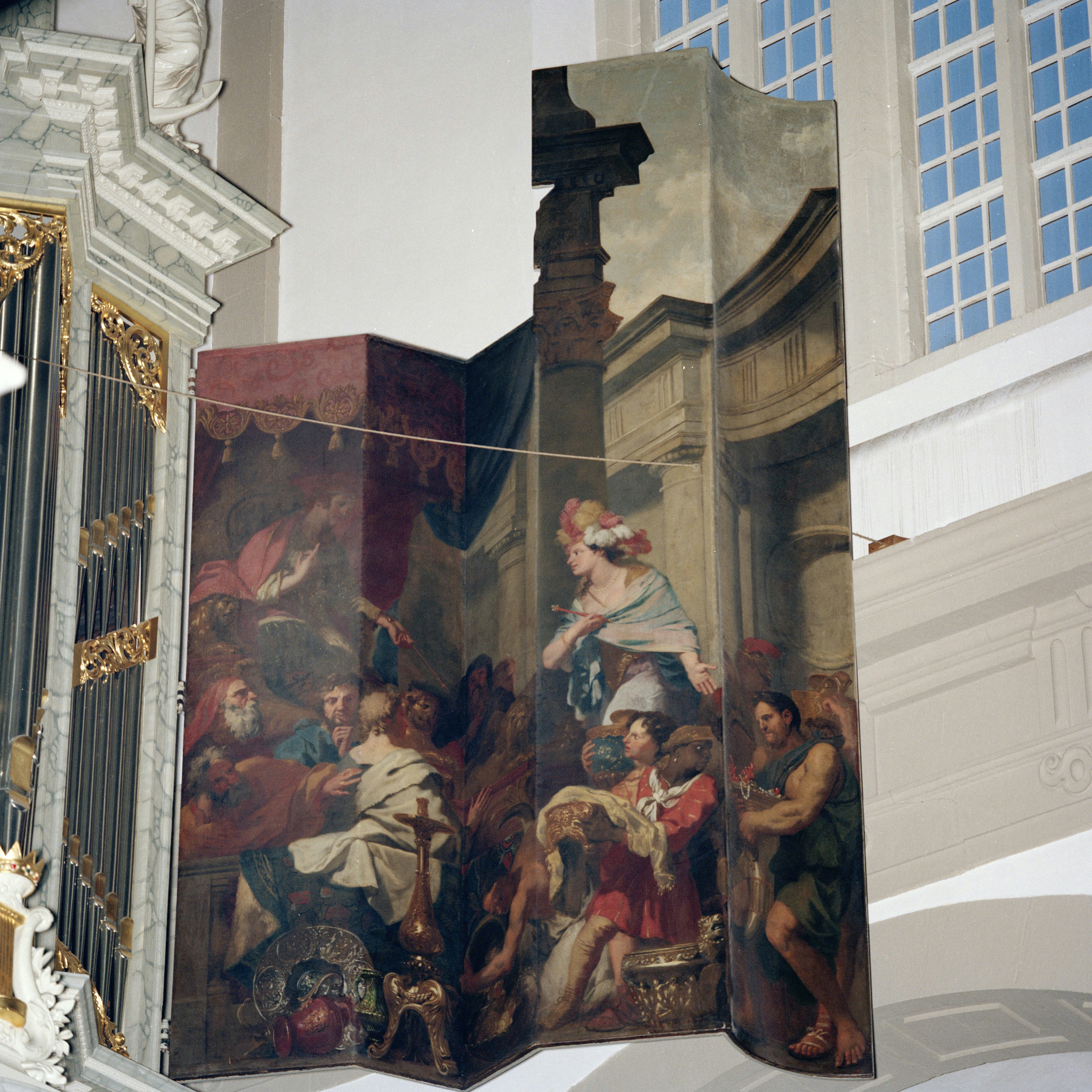
Inside of the right panel of the main organ 'The queen of Sheba is visiting King Solomon'

The inside of the organ shutters of the hoofdwerk was painted by Gerard de Lairesse. On the left panel is the dancing and playing King David in front of the Ark of the Covenant. On the right panel is the Queen of Sheba presenting gifts to King Solomon. Both are stories in the Book of Kings in the Old Testament of the Bible. Gerard de Lairesse was born in Liège in French Belgium in 1640 and he moved to Amsterdam in 1664. In the second half of the 17th century, he was one of the most popular painters in the Netherlands. At this moment, the shutters of the Duyschot organ can be seen on a retrospective of the work of Gerard de Lairesse at the National Museum Twente in Enschede. The outside paintings of these panels or shutters were lost in the 19th century when the church wanted to sell them. The grisailles on the rugwerk panels were also painted by Gerard de Lairesse; The four evangelists with their items are shown. The inside of the rugwerk shutters have paintings of old musical instruments. The complete organ was cleaned and re-painted in 1992 in its original state of colour in 1686, most of it in marble imitation.

== Ds. A.H. Visser organ ==
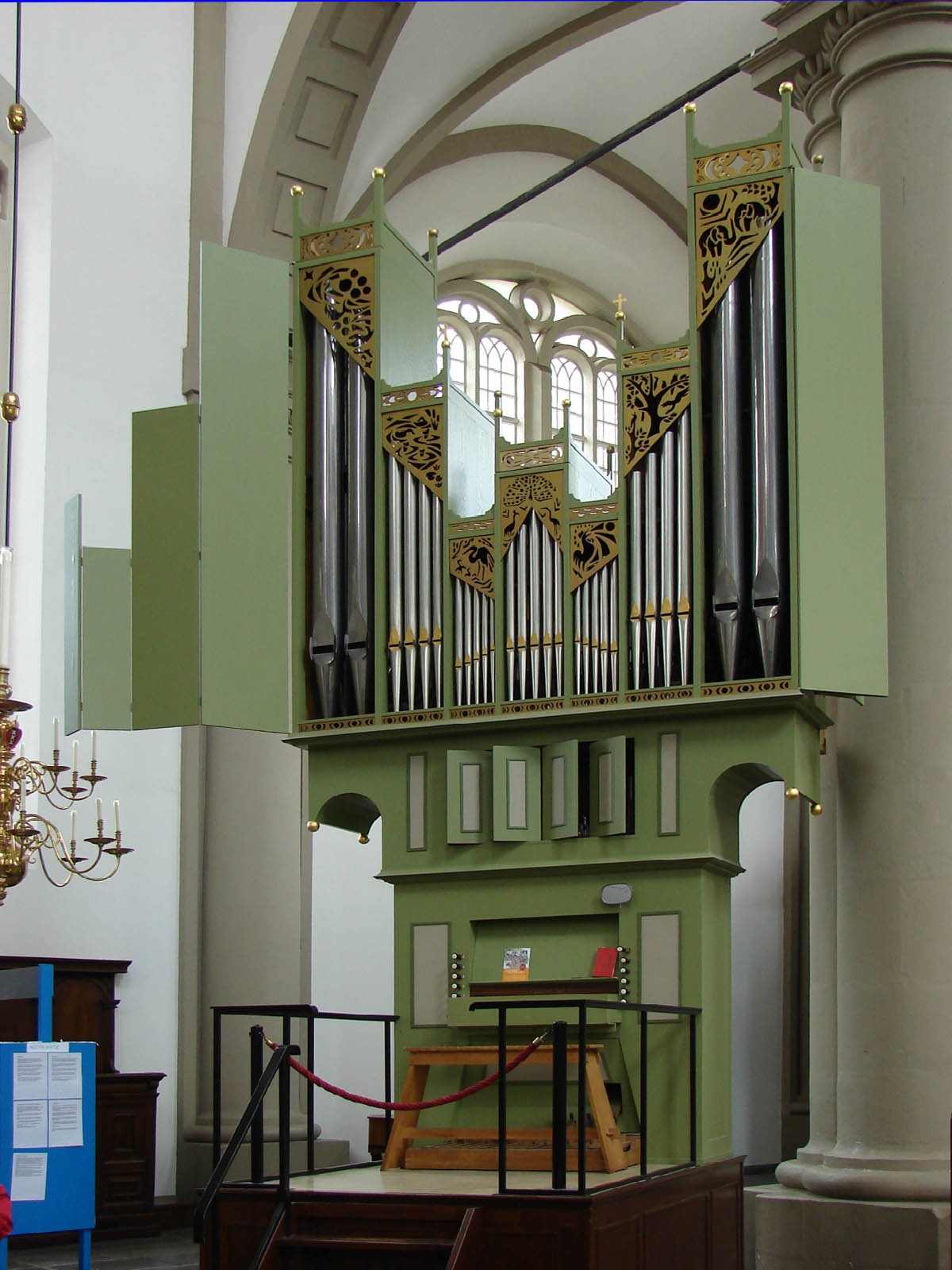
Choir organ Westerkerk Amsterdam

The small organ on the east side of the church was built in 1963 by D.A. Flentrop from Zaandam. It was tuned and slightly altered in 2001. In that year it was named after the minister Ds. H.A Visser who was the man begging for money to buy the organ in 1963. He succeeded. The organ has 12 stops over 2 manuals and pedal. Since 1963 the organ case was in not painted but plain oak wood. After the renovation it was painted in a light green color. In 2017 the organ was cleaned by Flentrop Zaandam. During the church interior restoration it was packed against the dust.

Stoplist

I Hoofdwerk (Great organ) C–g^{3} Holpijp 8' Prestant 4' Gemshoorn 4' Octaaf 2' Sesquialter II ranks Mixtuur III-IV ranks	II Borstwerk (Swell organ) C–g^{3} Holpijp 8' Roerfluit 4' Nachthoorn 2' Cimbel I-II ranks Regaal 8' Tremulant	Pedal C–d^{1} Subbas 16'

- Couplers: II/I, I/P, II/P

== The tower with the spire ==
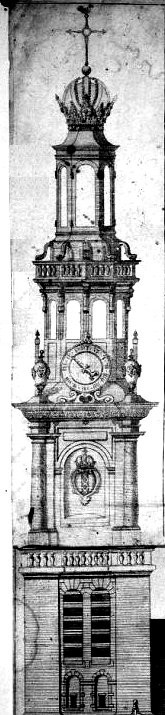
Not realized part from Westertoren, designed by Hendrick de Keyser

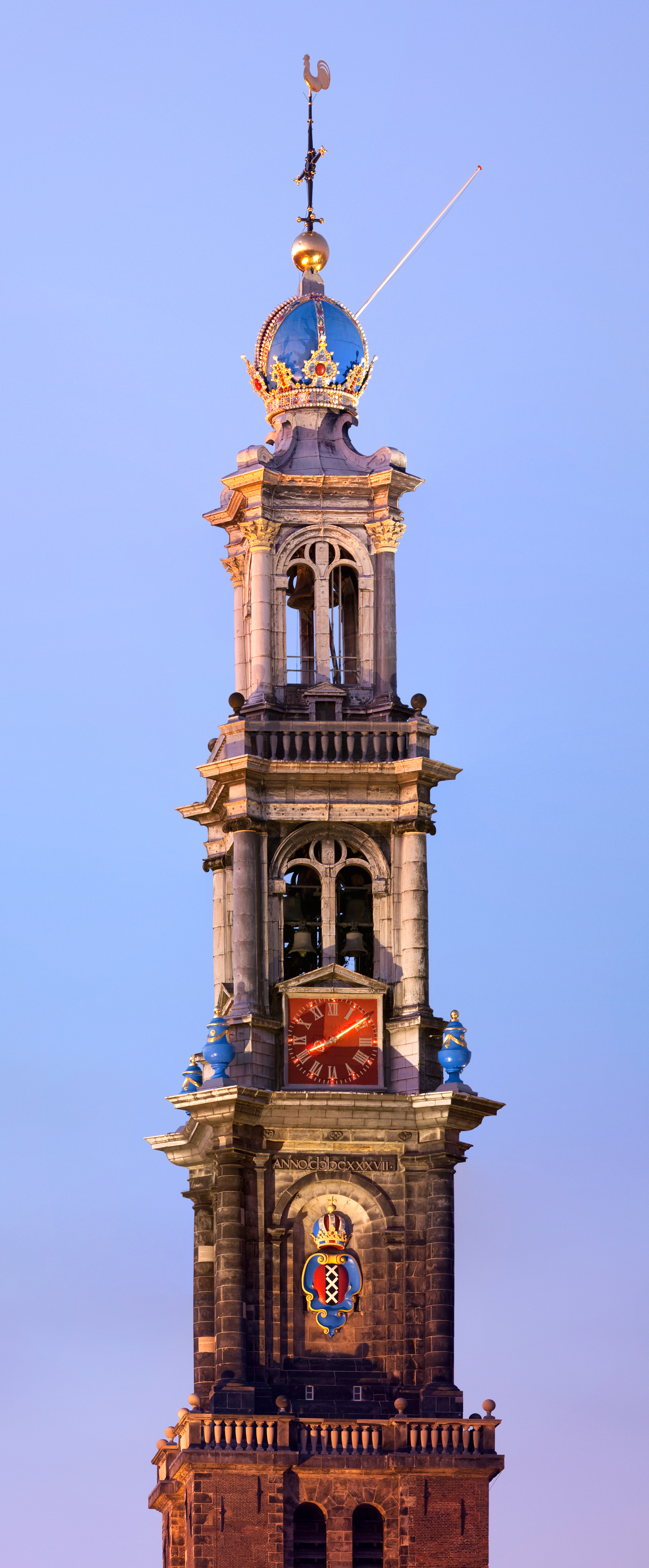
Westertoren

The tower, called the Westertoren ('western tower'), is the highest church tower in Amsterdam, at 87 meters (286 feet). It is not known who the designer of the spire was. Hendrick de Keyser designed an octagonal spire for the tower which was never built. It is suggested Jacob van Campen was the designer. The crown topping the spire is the Imperial Crown of Austria of Maximilian I. In 2006 the crown on top was painted in its original blue color.

== Bells in the Westertoren ==
Just above the clock-faces is the carillon. The largest 14 of the 51 bells in this carillon were cast by François Hemony in 1658. The modern bells were cast in 1959 by Eijsbouts replacing bells which had been damaged by atmospheric pollution. In 1991 three bells more were added by the same foundry. The smaller Hemony bells, which are not currently in use, can be seen in the tower together with the original baton keyboard from the 17th century. The carillon was enlarged to four octaves and is tuned in meantone temperament. It is the only carillon in the city chiming the entire twenty-four hours (At the request of the residents of the Jordaan District). The drum to do this was made by Jurriaen Spraeckel from Zutphen in 1659 and it still chimes every quarter of the hour to announce the hour and half hour strike. On the quarter of the hour a short tune is performed. The two strike bells were made by Assuerus (Ahasverus) Koster in 1636. The hour strike bell (F^{0}) is the largest in Amsterdam (7509 kg) and is hung in the room for the carillon. The text on this Bourdon bell is: "VERBUM DOMINI MANET IN ETERNUM - ASSUERUS KOSTER ME FECIT AMSTELDAMI 1636" The smaller bell (A^{1}) for half hour is hung in top of the spire just under the crown. Weekly on Tuesday at noon the city carillonneur gives his recital on the carillon for an hour. He is also responsible for the tunes on the drum and changes these twice a year. As of 2024, Boudewijn Zwart is the city carillonneur. A major restoration of the tower started in 2023 and was planned to be completed in 2024. The bells also had to go to the foundry to allow for an improved design in the windows of the tower, as the bells have hung for centuries with hammers that hang on the outside. The second city carillonneur Gideon Bodden was the advisor for this work on the carillon. No changes were made to the bells.

Westerkerk Amsterdam, ringing the bells for a service

In a lower chamber behind the sounding boards in the tower wall there are three swinging bells also made by François Hemony in 1658. The largest swinging bell was replaced after 27 years by Claude Fremy (his pupil, nephew and successor), because it was cracked. The bells (a major triad) are rung to announce the divine service on Sunday and also when the service is on, during praying the 'Our Father'. This bell by Fremy is also connected with the pedals in the baton keyboard of the carillon.

== Rembrandt ==
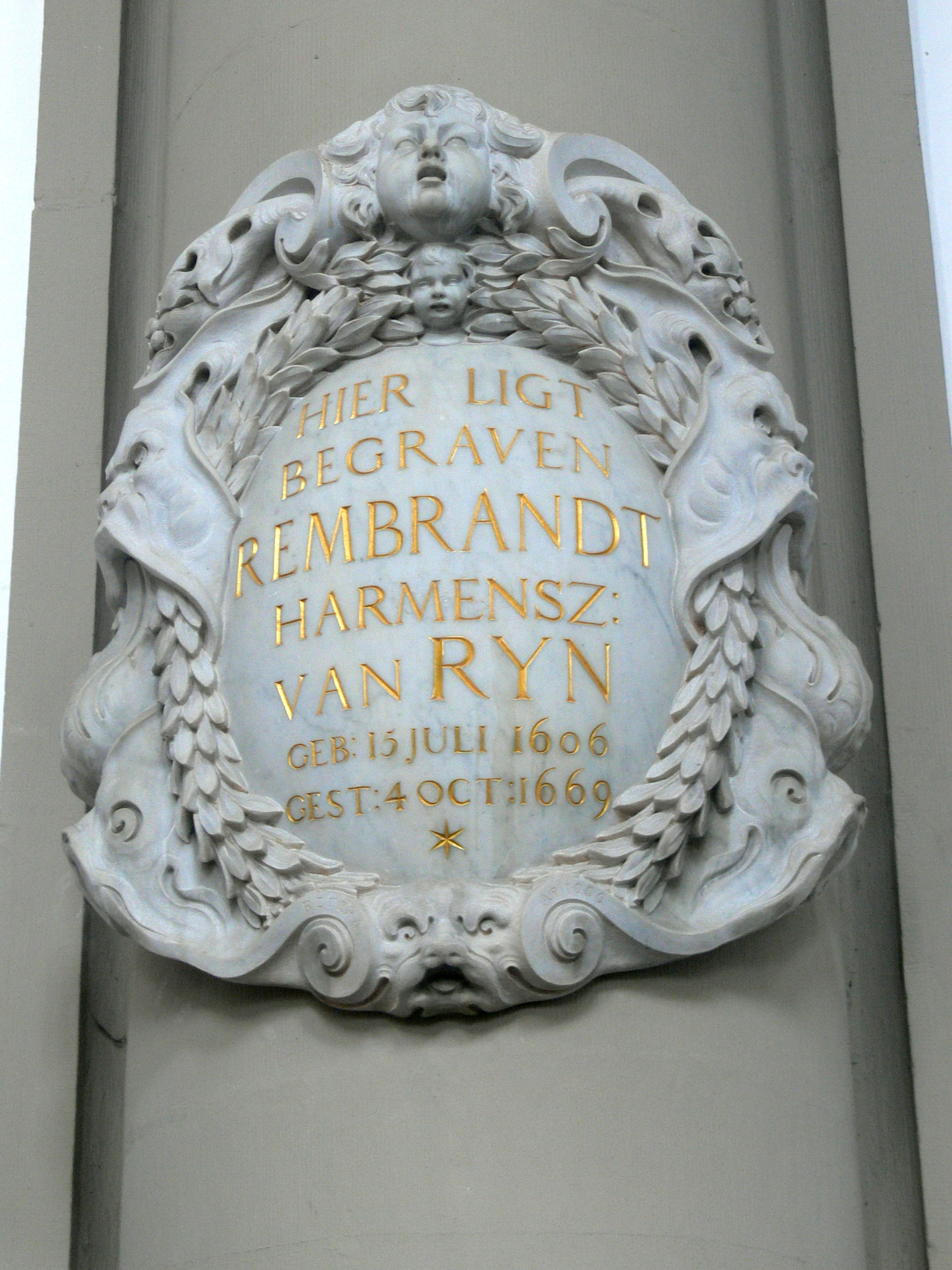
Remembrance stone copied from The Night Watch.

Rembrandt van Rijn was buried somewhere under a tombstone in the Westerkerk on October 8, 1669. The exact location of the grave is unknown; the number of his grave was lost. It was in a numbered kerkgraf (grave owned by the church). There is a memorial marker on the north wall, made in 1909 after a model on the Nachtwacht. After twenty years, his remains were taken away and destroyed. That was customary with the remains of poor people at that time. Rembrandt was buried as a poor man. Every year on his birthday anniversary, the 15th of July, he is remembered in the Westerkerk with a lunchtime concert with music from the time of Rembrandt's life, and flowers are hung on his memorial marker.

Rembrandt's lover Hendrickje Stoffels was also buried here, as was Rembrandt's son Titus van Rijn. Other painters buried in the Westerkerk are Nicolaes Berchem, Gillis d'Hondecoeter, Melchior d'Hondecoeter and Govert Flinck.

== Dutch royal family ==
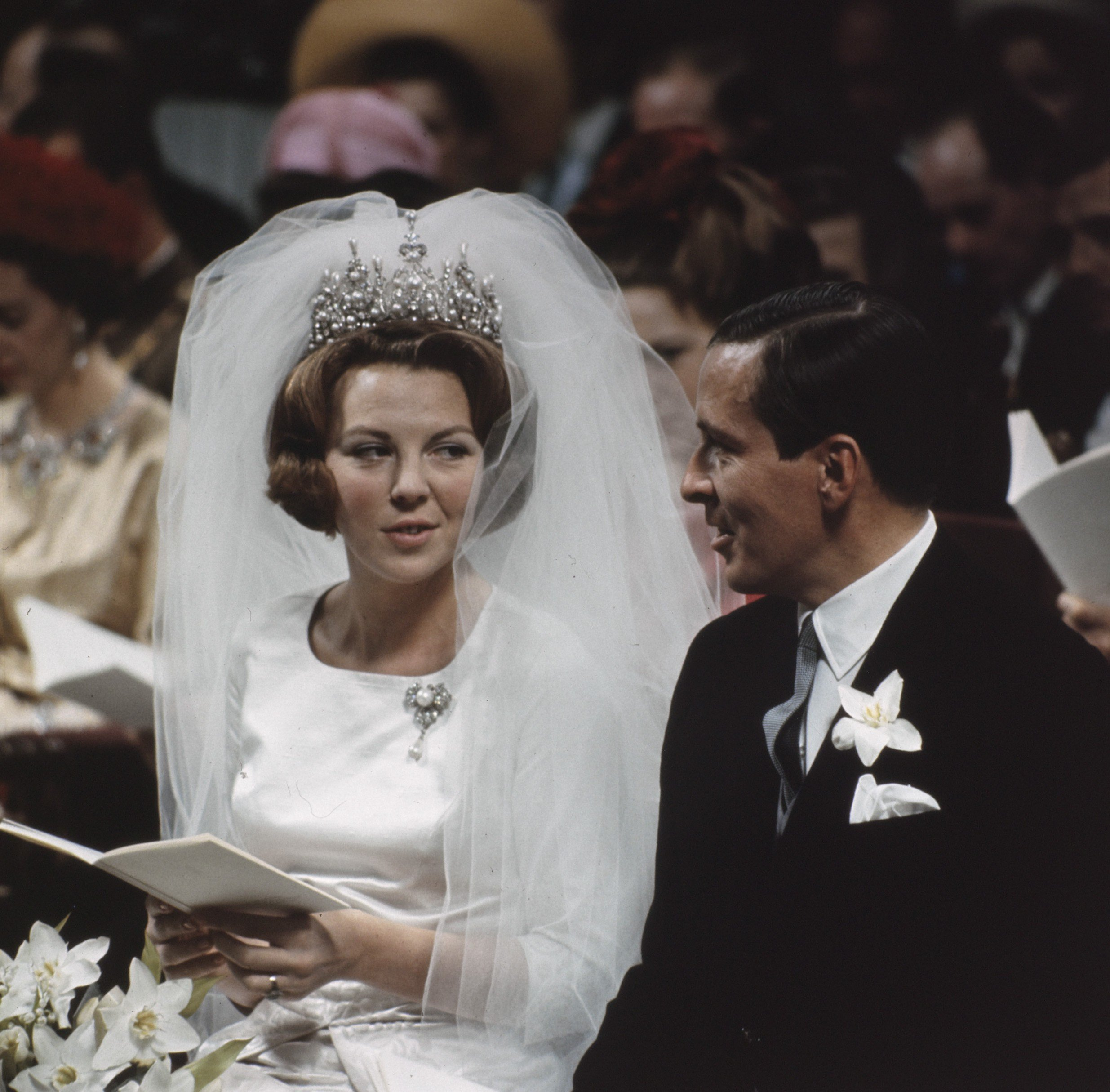
Princess Beatrix and Claus van Amsberg

On March 10, 1966, Princess Beatrix married Prince Claus von Amsberg in the Westerkerk. The Nieuwe Kerk on Dam Square where royal weddings are usually held was being renovated at the time.

== Anne Frank ==
The Westerkerk is located close to the Anne Frank House where diarist Anne Frank, her family and others were hid in the Achterhuis from Nazi persecution for two years during World War II. The Westertoren is mentioned frequently in her diary – its clock-face on the tower could be seen from the attic of the Achterhuis, and Anne Frank described the chiming of the carillon as a source of comfort. A memorial statue of Anne Frank is located outside the church at Westermarkt.

== Burials ==
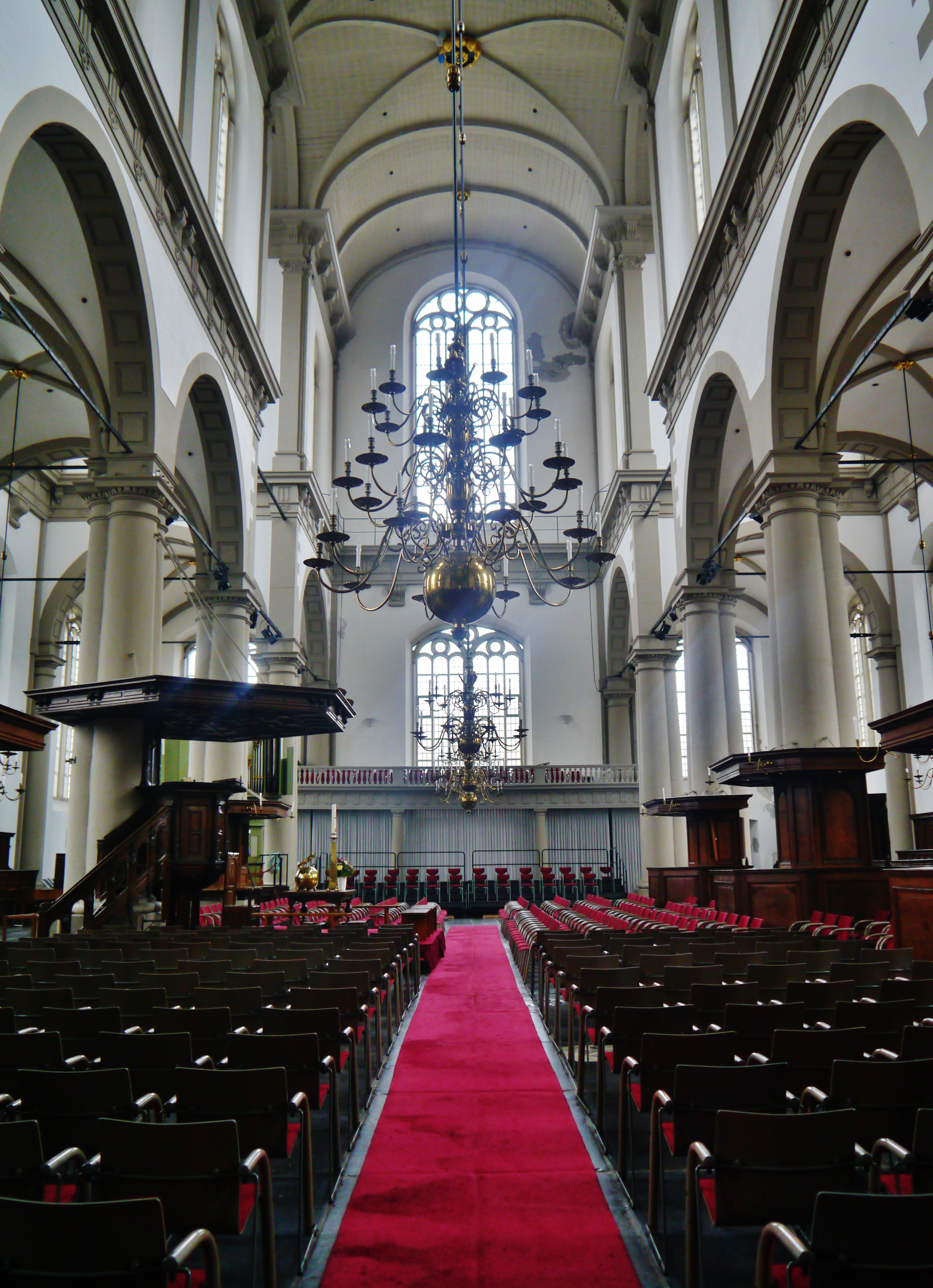
Interior of the Westerkerk

- Nicolaes Pietersz. Berchem (1620–1683), painter
- Jan Bicker (1591–1653), shipbuilder and merchant
- Joan Blaeu (1596–1673), printer, publisher and cartographer
- Steven Blankaart (1650–1704), physician and entomologist
- Samuel Blommaert (1583–1651), merchant, director of the Dutch West India Company
- Anthonie van Borssom (1631–1677), painter and draughtsman
- Pieter de Carpentier (1586–1659), Governor-General of the Dutch East India Company, after whom the Gulf of Carpentaria in Australia is named
- Frederick Coyett (1615/1620–1687), last Dutch governor of Dutch Formosa (present-day Taiwan)
- Christoffel van Dijck (c. 1605–1669), typefounder, with his wife and son Abraham
- Govert Flinck (1615–1660), painter
- Johann Rudolph Glauber (1604–1670), German pharmacist and chemist
- Pieter van Gunst (1658/9–1732), painter
- Gillis d'Hondecoeter (ca. 1575–1638), painter
- Melchior d'Hondecoeter (1636–1695), painter
- Rembrandt van Rijn (1606/1607–1669), painter
- Titus van Rijn son of Rembrandt (1641–1668)
- Hendrickje Stoffels mistress of Rembrandt (1626–1663)
- Albertus Seba (1665–1736), pharmacist and collactor
- Jacques Specx (1585–1652), merchant who established the Dutch trade with Japan and Korea
- Isaak Tirion (1705–1765), book trader and publisher
- Hendrick van Uylenburgh (ca. 1587–1661), art trader

== Notable people ==
- Cristina Pumplun, missionary vicar

== See also ==
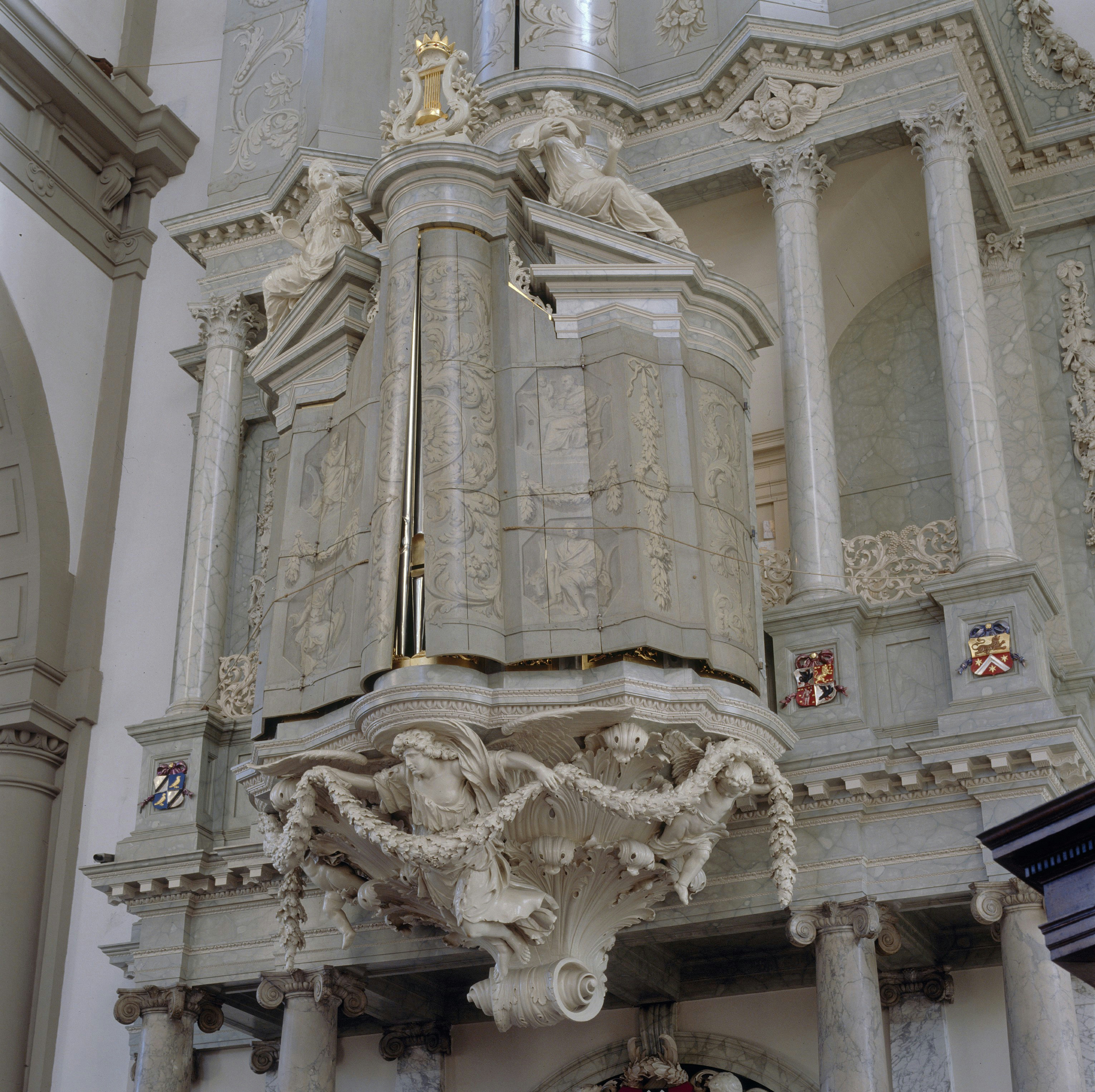
The grisailles on the closed 'rugwerk'

- Renaissance architecture
- Northern Renaissance
- List of tallest structures built before the 20th century
- The Reformation and its influence on church architecture

== Bibliography ==
- ISBN 9789062785438 I Roelfs Jan en Balk Jaap Th. - De oude Wester 350 jaar. uitg. Tiebosch 1981 (in Dutch)
- ISBN 978-8716758002 Balkenende Maria - De orgels van de Westerkerk in Amsterdam (incl cd) (in Dutch)
- ISBN 90 331 03729 Seijbel Maarten - Orgels rond het IJsselmeer blz 113-115 (in Dutch)
- Prof. F.C. Stam - Het hoofdorgel van de Westerkerk te Amsterdam. (small booklet in Dutch)
