= Emily Holmes =

Canadian actress (born 1977)

- Born: March 1, 1977 (age 48); Ottawa, Ontario, Canada
- Occupation: Actress
- Years active: 2000–present
- Spouse: Michael Ziff (m. 2004)

Emily Holmes (born March 1, 1977) is a Canadian actress. She has appeared in television series such as Night Visions, Mysterious Ways, The Dead Zone (Chapter 1 and 2 of the first season), Stargate SG-1, Dark Angel and more. In 2002, Holmes appeared in Steven Spielberg's Taken as Julie Crawford. She also appeared in the webisode series Battlestar Galactica: The Resistance and Gene Roddenberry's Andromeda.

== Filmography ==
=== Film ===
Year	Title	Role	Notes
2003	Paycheck	Betsy	
2005	Familia	Kate	
2006	Snakes on a Plane	Ashley	
2007	Nightwatching	Hendrickje Stoffels	
2008	Sarah in the Dark	Emelia	Short
2009	Year of the Carnivore	Kathy	
2013	Prisoner of the Sun	Claire Becket	
2014	Pinocchio Project	Dr. Rachel Porter	
2017	Woody Woodpecker	Linda Walters	
2017	The Shack	Vicky Ducette	
2018	Boundaries	Over Tired Mom	

=== Television ===
Year	Title	Role	Notes
2000-01	2gether: The Series	Lita	"Forever I", "Jillie"
2001	Till Dad Do Us Part	Rebecca Corbett	TV film
2001	Night Visions	Amanda Bell / Belinda	"The Passenger List", "A View Through the Window"
2001	Strange Frequency	Denise Cole	"Don't Stop Believing"
2001	Mysterious Ways	Sarah Summers	"Child of Wonder"
2001-02	Dark Angel	Wendy White	"Medium Is the Message", "Exposure"
2002	Jinnah - On Crime: Pizza 911	Caitlin Bishop	TV film
2002	Beyond Belief: Fact or Fiction	Rena Dunne	1 episode
2002	The Dead Zone	Allison Connover	"Wheel of Fortune", "What It Seems"
2002	The Secret Life of Zoey	Joan	TV film
2002	That Was Then	Adult Zoey Glass	"Pilot"
2002	Taken	Julie Crawford	TV miniseries
2002	No Night Is Too Long	Emily	TV film
2003	Strange Frequency 2	Denise	TV film
2003	Tom Stone	Zoey Samuels	"Busted Shoulder"
2003	Lucky 7	Mary	TV film
2004	Stargate SG-1	Kianna Cyr	"Fallout"
2004	Tru Calling	Nicole Simms	"Murder in the Morgue"
2004	The Goodbye Girl	Rhonda	TV film
2004	Andromeda	Indra Xicol	"Trusting the Guardian Maze"
2004	The Collector	Sophia Marteau	"Another Collector"
2004	Dead Like Me	Ashley Hesberg	"Be Still My Heart"
2005	Ladies Night	Jeanne	TV film
2005	The L Word	Lola	"L'Chaim"
2005	Into the West	Leah Wheeler	"Manifest Destiny"
2006	Battlestar Galactica: The Resistance	Nora Farmer	TV miniseries
2007	Smallville	Jodi Keenan	"Nemesis"
2007	Bionic Woman	Marty	"Paradise Lost"
2007	Supernatural	Mrs. Walsh	"A Very Supernatural Christmas"
2008	The Andromeda Strain	Joanne Scott	TV miniseries
2009	Fringe	Jill Leiter	"Dream Logic"
2010	Meteor Storm	Laura	TV film
2010	True Blue	Molly Banks	TV film
2011	Endgame	Anya	"The Caffeine Hit"
2011	Magic Beyond Words	Diane Rowling	TV film
2011	The Secret Circle	Amelia Blake	"Pilot", "Balcoin"
2012	Big Time Movie	MI6 #2	TV film
2012	Alcatraz	Georgia Bradley	"Tommy Madsen"
2012	Supernatural	Hester	"Reading Is Fundamental"
2012	Emily Owens, M.D.	Vicky	"Pilot"
2013	Independence Daysaster	Celia Leyman	Television film
2013	King & Maxwell	Christine Hayward	"Locked In"
2013	Delete	Naomi Overson	TV miniseries
2014	Zodiac: Signs of the Apocalypse	Kathryn Keen	TV film
2014	My Boyfriends' Dogs	Amber	TV film
2014	Blackstone	Sheila Masters	"Discovery", "There Will Be Blood"
2015	Cedar Cove	Liz Watson	"Batter Up", "Runaway"
2016	Zoo	Dr. Elise Lindberg	"Collision Point"
2016	A Heavenly Christmas	Sally	TV film
2016	The Man in the High Castle	Lucy Collins	Recurring role
