= Cristina Pumplun =

Missionary vicar (born 1965)

Cristina M. Pumplun (1965) is the missionary vicar of Westerkerk in Amsterdam. Until 2003 she was Secretary of Studies at the Thomas Institute of Tilburg University in Utrecht.

Pumplun studied German language and literature at Vrije Universiteit Amsterdam, and then at Universität Passau, Germany. Her Ph.D. thesis investigated German devotional texts of the 17th century, specifically the work of Catharina Regina von Greiffenberg, and was published as Begriff des Unbegreiflichen: Funktion und Bedeutung der Metaphorik in den Geburtsbetrachtungen der Catharina Regina von Greiffenberg (1633-1694) (1995). She taught modern German literature and culture from 1995 to 2000 at Radboud University Nijmegen and the University of Amsterdam. Pumplun also studied theology at Vrije Universiteit Amsterdam and Protestantse Theologische Universiteit in Amsterdam and obtained her master's degree in 2015. She publishes articles, reviews and columns in various papers and magazines on theology, religion and the role of churches in society.

== Bibliography ==
- Pumplun, Cristina M. (1995). Begriff des Unbegreiflichen: Funktion und Bedeutung der Metaphorik in den Geburtsbetrachtungen der Catharina Regina von Greiffenberg (1633-1694). Rodopi. ISBN 9789051839203.
- Elrud, Ibsch; Kunne, Andrea; Pumplun, Cristina M., eds. (1998). De Literaire Dood. Opstellen aan Ferdinand van Ingen. Assen: Van Gorcum. (Festschrift for Ferdinand van Ingen)
