= Saskia van Uylenburgh =

Wife of Rembrandt van Rijn

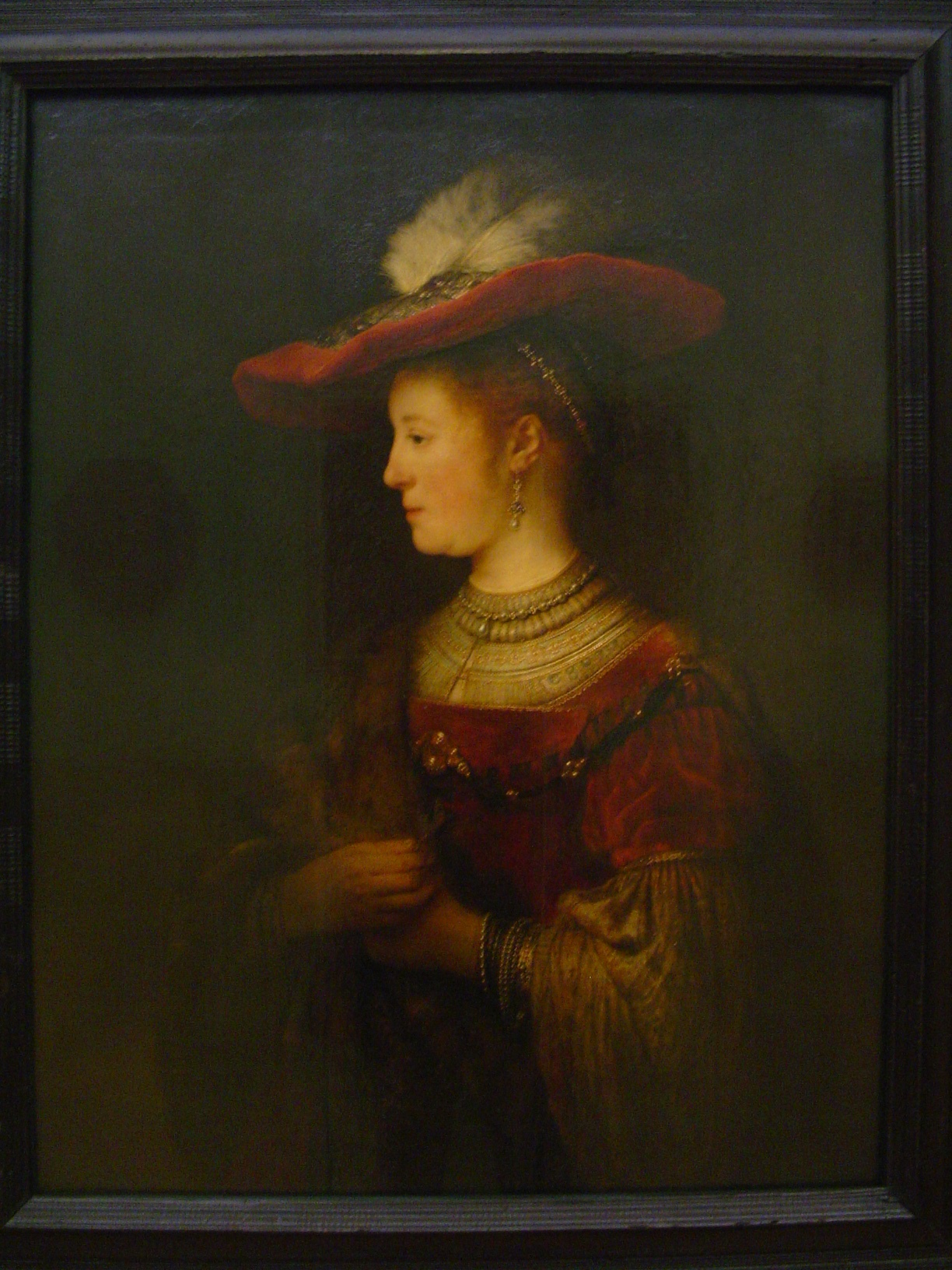
Saskia van Uylenburgh (Schloss Wilhelmshöhe, Kassel, Germany), 1633

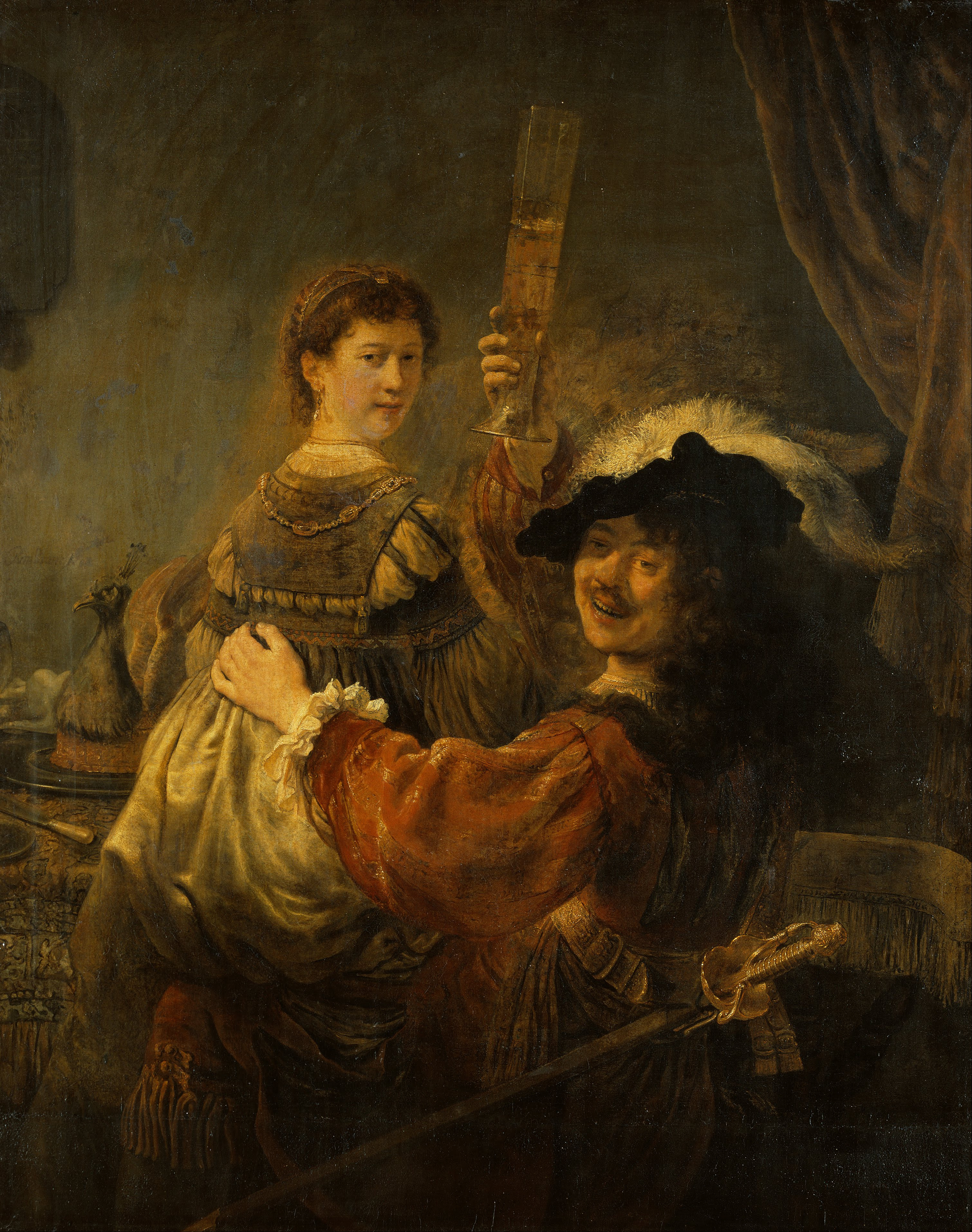
The Prodigal Son in the Brothel, a self-portrait with Saskia van Uylenburgh (c. 1635)

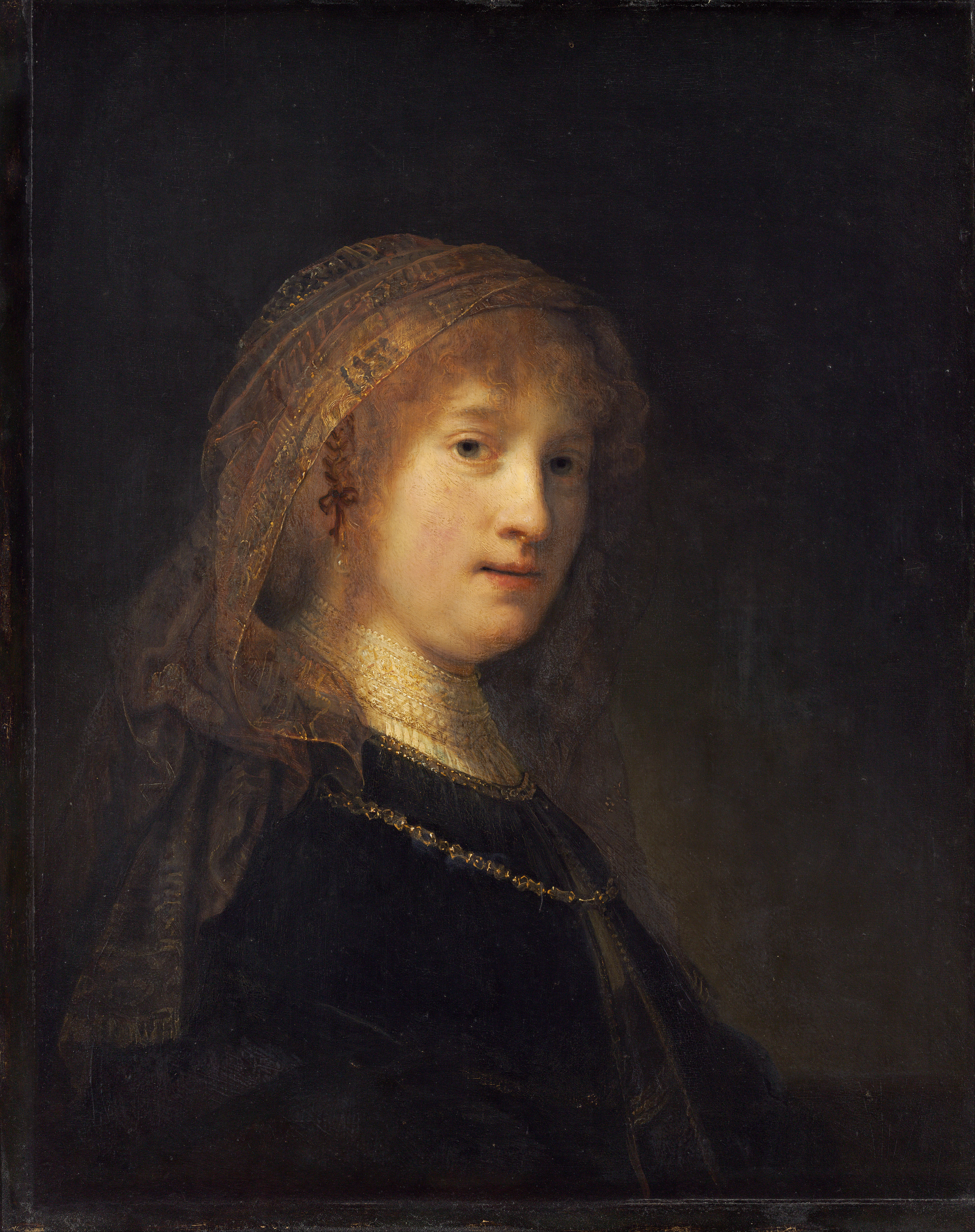
Rembrandt's portrait of Saskia van Uylenburgh (c. 1635)

Saskia van Uylenburgh (West Frisian: Saakje fan Uylenburgh; 2 August 1612 – 14 June 1642) was the wife of painter Rembrandt van Rijn. In the course of her life, she was his model for some of his paintings, drawings, and etchings. She was the daughter of Rombertus Uylenburg, the mayor as well as the justice of the Court of Friesland.

== Life ==
Saskia was born in Leeuwarden, Friesland, the youngest of the eight children of Sjoukje Ozinga and Rombertus van Uylenburgh, a top lawyer, a town burgomaster, and one of the founders of the University of Franeker. Saskia (called Saske in Friesland) was orphaned by age 12, as her mother died in 1619 and her father five years later. Supposedly she met Rembrandt at the home of her first cousin, Hendrick van Uylenburgh, a painter and art dealer who had emigrated from Friesland to Kraków in Poland with his parents but decided in 1625 to move to the Dutch Republic, where there was growing tolerance after the death of Maurice of Orange.

Saskia was raised by her sister Hiskje and her husband, Gerard van Loo, a lawyer and secretary in the grietenij Het Bildt. For a while she lived in Franeker when her sister Antje was ill. After Antje's burial, Saskia assisted her brother-in-law, the Polish theology professor Johannes Maccovius, until she married Rembrandt in 1634.

In 1631 and in the company of the Mennonite painters Govert Flinck and Jacob Backer, Saskia travelled to Amsterdam. There she met Rembrandt, who produced paintings and portraits for Uylenburgh's Amsterdam clients. In turn Rembrandt travelled to Leeuwarden, where he was received by the painter Wybrand de Geest, who had married Saskia's niece.

Saskia and Rembrandt were engaged on 5 June 1633, and a year later Rembrandt asked permission to marry in Sint Annaparochie. He showed his mother's written consent to the schepen. On 2 July 1634 the couple married. The preacher was Saskia's cousin, but evidently none of Rembrandt's family attended the marriage. That Saskia fell in love with an artist who was socially no match for the daughter of a patrician and that she pressed for a speedy betrothal against all conventions certainly shows that she was a very strong and independent character. In 1635 the couple moved to one of the most desirable addresses in Amsterdam, the Nieuwe Doelenstraat, with prominent neighbors and a view of the river Amstel.

Rembrandt gained financial success through his artwork, and decided in 1639 to buy a house in the Jodenbreestraat, next to the place where he worked. A year before, by 16 July 1638, Saskia's Friesian relatives complained that Saskia was despoiling her inheritance. Rembrandt asked his brother-in-law Ulricus van Uylenburgh, also a lawyer, to help them out, confirming he was successful and able to pay for the house.

Three of their children died shortly after birth and were buried in the nearby Zuiderkerk. The sole survivor was Titus, who was named after his mother's sister Titia (Tietje) van Uylenburgh. Saskia died the year after he was born, in Amsterdam, aged 29, probably from tuberculosis. She was buried in the Oude Kerk. For ten years Rembrandt focused on drawings and etchings.

Saskia allowed Rembrandt to use their son's inheritance as long as he did not remarry. If Titus died without issue, Rembrandt would be the heir of the moveable property. Rembrandt hired Geertje Dircx as a wetnurse; in 1649 she expected him to marry her. The next year Rembrandt had her locked up in a house of correction when Hendrickje Stoffels became his new housekeeper and mistress. In 1662 Rembrandt, having been in financial trouble for several years, sold Saskia's grave. Hendrickje died the following year.

Asteroid 461 Saskia is named in her honour.

== See also ==
- The Embarrassment of Riches: An Interpretation of Dutch Culture in the Golden Age

== Sources ==
- Driessen, Christoph (2011): Rembrandts vrouwen, Bert Bakker.
- Graaff, A. & M. Roscam Abbing (2006) Rembrandt voor Dummies. Addison Wesley.
