= Titus van Rijn =

Son of Rembrandt (1641–1668)

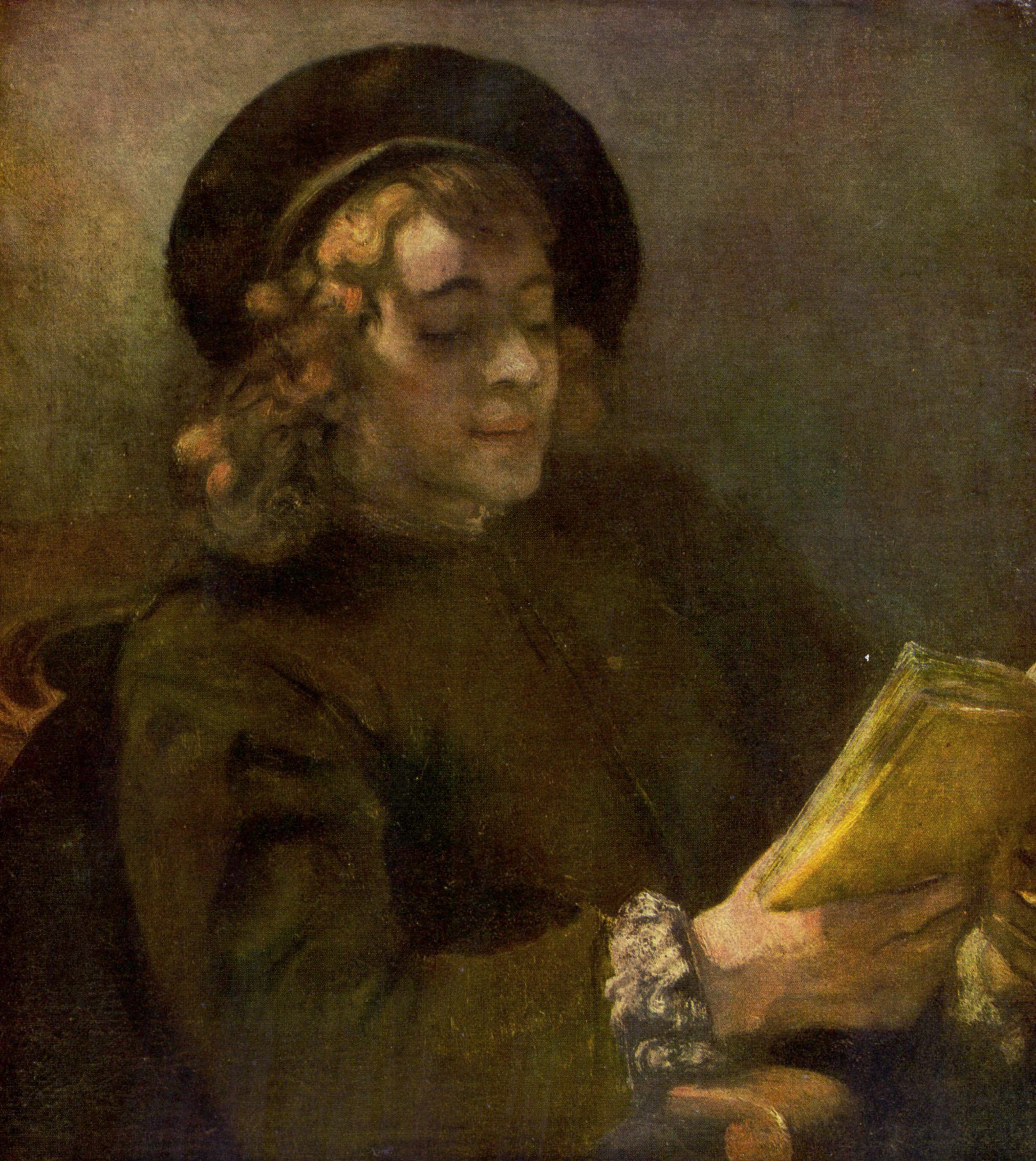
- Portrait of Titus by his father (Kunsthistorisches Museum, Vienna)
- Born: September 22, 1641; Amsterdam, Dutch Republic
- Died: September 4, 1668 (aged 26); Amsterdam, Dutch Republic
- Resting place: Westerkerk, Amsterdam
- Spouse: Magdalena van Loo
- Children: Titia van Rijn
- Parent(s): Rembrandt van Rijn; Saskia van Uylenburgh

Titus van Rijn (22 September 1641 – 4 September 1668) was the son of Rembrandt Harmenszoon van Rijn and Saskia van Uylenburgh. He is known as a model in his father's paintings and studies, as an art-dealer but also because of a legal case. Titus and Rembrandt were Saskia's only heirs.

== Early life ==
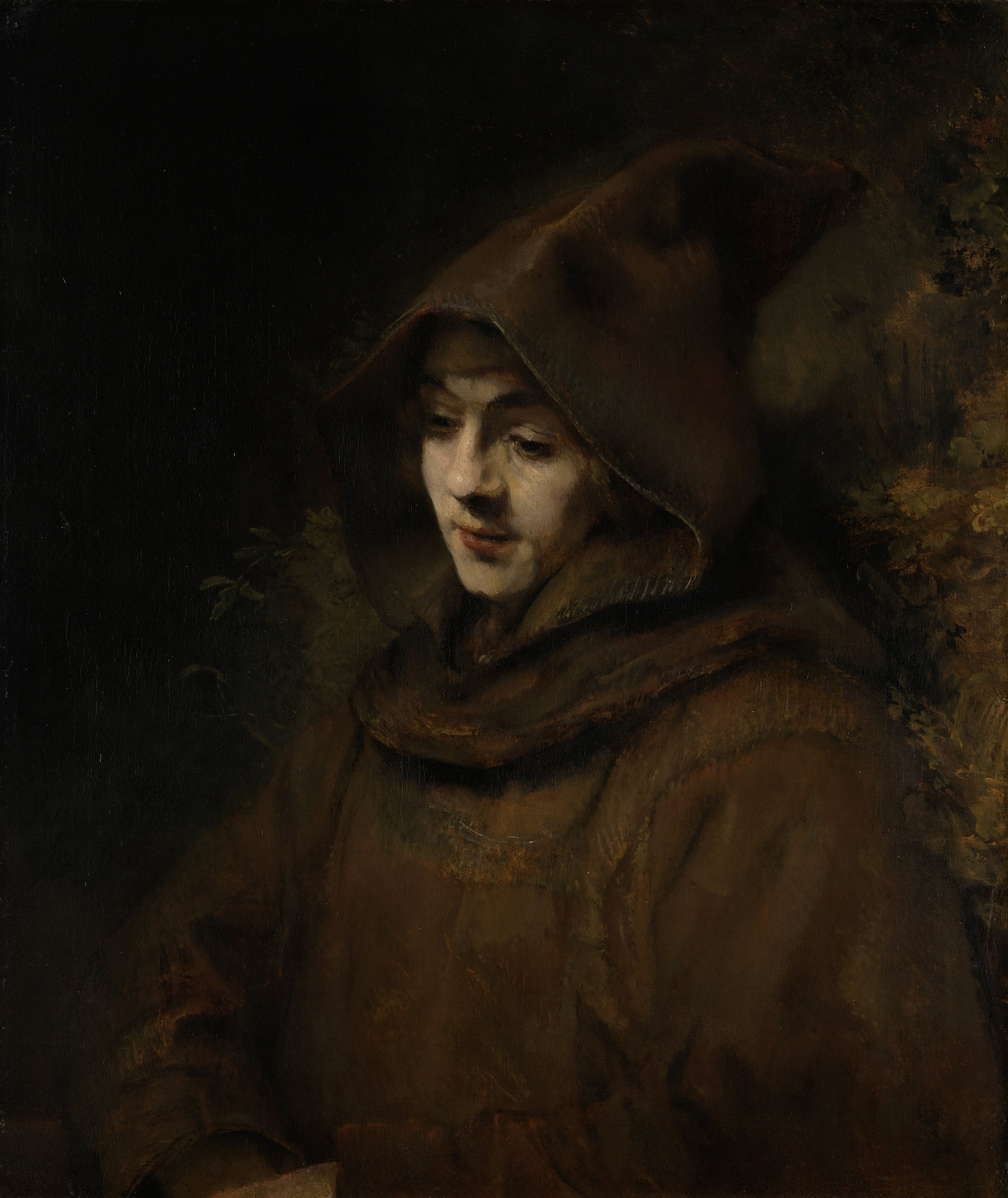
Rembrandt's son Titus, painted as a Franciscan monk (1660).

Titus van Rijn grew up in what is now the Rembrandthuis. Around 1643, Geertje Dircx was hired as his caretaker and wet nurse. In 1649 she quarrelled with Rembrandt van Rijn, probably in connection with his relationship with Hendrickje Stoffels.

In 1655, during a year of plague, the fourteen-year-old Titus made a will at his father’s request, naming Rembrandt as sole heir. One year later his half-sister Cornelia (1654-1684) became his only heir. In May 1656 Rembrandt transferred his share in the house to Titus shortly before applying for cessio bonorum. After the insolvency proceedings a guardian, Louis Crayers, was appointed to represent Titus’s interests and laid claim to the property on his behalf. The house was sold at foreclosure in 1658, after which the family moved from the Jodenbreestraat to more modest rented lodgings on the Rozengracht.

Because Rembrandt could no longer trade independently, Titus and Hendrickje established an art dealership in 1660 through which his works were marketed, while he received board and lodging. In 1661 they secured a commission for the new town hall, resulting in The Conspiracy of Claudius Civilis, later rejected by the mayors.

After Hendrickje’s death in 1663 Titus assumed a more prominent role in managing family affairs and, in 1665, was declared of age. As Rembrandt’s principal creditor he held first claim in the event of further insolvency, a position confirmed in subsequent legal disputes before the High Court. If Rembrandt went insolvent, Titus became the first person to be paid off, before any other creditors could step in.

In 1662 Isaac van Hertsbeeck, one of Rembrandt's creditors, went to the High Court as he didn't accept Titus had to be paid first. Isaac van Hertsbeeck lost twice and had to pay back the money he had already received to Titus, which he did in 1668. In the end it was especially Cornelis Jan Witsen who profited from the sale at the expense of Titus.

== Marriage and death ==
Curator's Choice: Rembrandt's Titus, Museum Boijmans Van Beuningen, Video (2:35) In Dutch with English subtitles

In February 1668, Titus married the daughter of a silversmith, Magdalena van Loo (1641-1669), related to his aunt in het Bildt. He moved in at her mother's house at Singel and owned quite a few paintings by Adriaen Brouwer. Titus died on 4 September 1668 and was buried three days later. Six months later, the widow gave birth to Titia. As one of Rembrandt's heirs and in the possession of his keys, Magdalena did not wish to declare herself legatee but wanted to reserve the right and [decide] later on. Titus' considerable inheritance of 12,000 guilders passed to Titia, who married in Sloten her cousin François Bijler, and died at Blauwburgwal.
