= Cessio bonorum =

Concept in Roman law

Cessio bonorum (Latin for a "surrender of goods"), in Roman law, is a voluntary surrender of goods by a debtor to his creditors. It did not amount to a discharge unless the property ceded was sufficient for the purpose, but it secured the debtor from personal arrest. The creditors sold the goods as partial restoration of their claims. The procedure of cessio bonorum avoided infamia, and the debtor, though his after-acquired property might be proceeded against, could not be deprived of the bare necessaries of life. The main features of the Roman law of cessio bonorum were adopted in medieval law, Scots law, and also in French law. A similar concept of the same name exists in Anglo-American law, although this is "used ... rather as a convenient than as a strictly technical term."
