= Pallas Athena (Rembrandt) =

1650s painting by Rembrandt

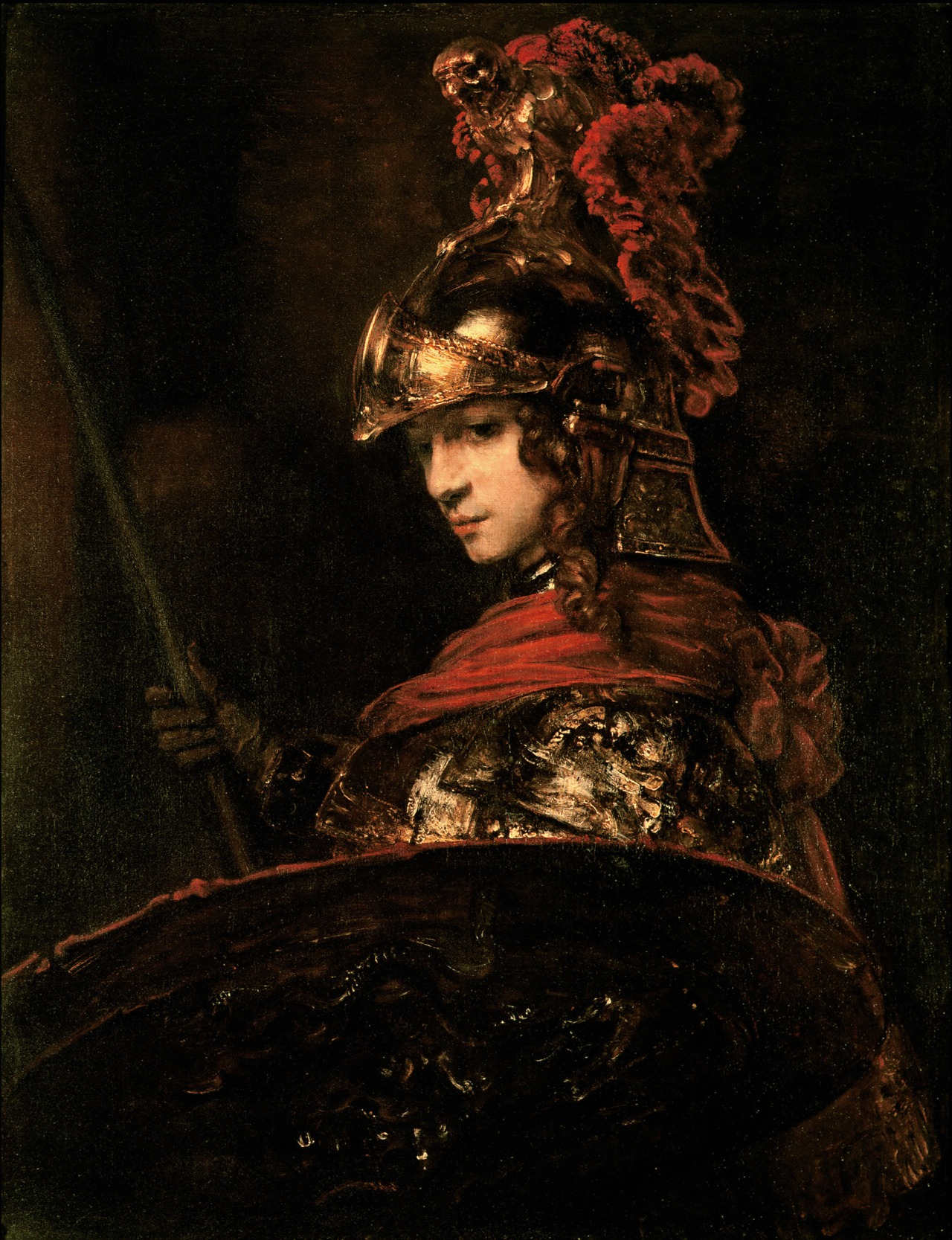
Pallas Athene (c. 1657) by Rembrandt

Pallas Athena is a c. 1657 oil-on-canvas painting by Rembrandt.

The subject is thought to be the Greek goddess Pallas Athena, although there are various theories, such as Alexander the Great, and no consensus has been reached. It is known to have been owned by Empress Catherine the Great of Russia and Armenian businessman Calouste Gulbenkian. It is currently housed in the Calouste Gulbenkian Museum in Lisbon.

A print of Pallas Athene in the 1659 parade for the marriage of Countess Henriette Catherine of Nassau to John George II of Anhalt-Dessau is similar in pose and costume to this painting. The goddess was played by the artist's son Titus van Rijn, which has led to the theory that he based it on Titus' appearance in the parade. Catherine II of Russia bought the painting from count Baudouin in Paris in 1781 via Melchior Grimm. She then gave it to her lover Alexander Lanskoy and it was later transferred to the Hermitage Museum. On 27 June 1930 it was bought by its present owner via Antikvariat, an art dealer.

== Artwork ==
Rembrandt depicts a bust of the armed goddess Athena from a side angle. Athena is clad in black armour and wears a Macedonian-style helmet adorned with red feathers. Long curls fall from her helmet onto her shoulders, she wears a red cloak around her neck, holds a large round shield in her left hand, and carries a spear in her gloved right hand. Rembrandt gives Athena a characteristic that attributes to her to indicate that he is depicting the goddess. For example, the round shield bears the head of the monster Medusa, identifying it as the aegis, Athena's shield. The helmet is also adorned with an owl, the symbol of Athena.

The iconographic source is said to be a series of engravings entitled The Greek Gods, produced by Wenceslaus Hollar in 1646. These were based on original drawings by the cabinet painter Adam Elsheimer, which included a work depicting Minerva.

The work is generally dated to around 1655, though some scholars consider it to be from the late 1650s.

The lower and left sections of the canvas have been cut away.

== Interpretation ==
The subject of this work has not necessarily been regarded as Athena and has been the subject of debate. For example, the 19th-century art historian John Smith considered it to depict a warrior in the style of Alexander the Great. In the early 20th century, Andrey Ivanovich Somov identified it as Pallas Athena, while Cornelis Hofstede de Groot identified it as Minerva. Adolf Rosenberg and Wilhelm Valentiner, however, interpreted it as Mars, the Roman god of war. Furthermore, Godefridus Johannes Hoogewerff pointed to the possibility of Alexander the Great, and this theory was repeatedly asserted by other researchers from the 1960s to the 1970s.

Rembrandt's Alexander the Great is sometimes considered a lost work, initially painted for the Sicilian nobleman Antonio Ruffo, along with Aristotle with a Bust of Homer in the Metropolitan Museum of Art and Homer Dictating his Verses in the Mauritshuis. The Kelvingrove Art Gallery and Museum in Glasgow has a very similar work on the same subject, Man in Armour, but records show that Ruffo was not satisfied with the first work, and it is known that Rembrandt sent another work on the same subject, which is thought to be one of these two. Furthermore, ancient Greek coins often bore the images of Alexander and Athena on their obverse and reverse sides, respectively. Consequently, since the Renaissance period, the two figures have been confused, giving rise to depictions of Alexander in the guise of Athena.

However, there is an important counterargument to this theory. While Ruffo's Alexander the Great was still in the Ruffo Collection in Messina in 1783, this work belonged to a private collection in Paris in 1780, which negates the theory that it is at least a painting by Ruffo.

Other evidence that the figure is Athena includes the helmet adorned with an owl and the shield bearing the head of Medusa. An engraving of Pallas Athena that appeared in the 1659 wedding parade of Henriette Catharina of Nassau and John George II, Prince of Anhalt-Dessau, is similar to this work in terms of pose and costume. This goddess was portrayed by Rembrandt's son, Titus van Rijn, which has led to the hypothesis that Rembrandt painted this work based on Titus' appearance in the parade. Titus may have posed as a model.

A recent hypothesis suggests that this painting was part of a trilogy, alongside the Louvre's Venus en Amour (1660s) and the Hammer Museum's Juno (early 1660s). The view is that the three works were probably commissioned from Rembrandt by the art dealer Herman Becker (c. 1617–1678).

== Attribution ==
For many years, this painting was considered an authentic Rembrandt work, but since 1991, several researchers have questioned its attribution to Rembrandt. This was first suggested by an art historian Christopher Brown, who suggested that it was the work of one of Rembrandt's students. In 2006, Ernst van de Wetering proposed that Rembrandt had completed the work with the help of an assistant in his studio, and this view has since become generally accepted. While examination of the sketch certainly reveals the expressive power of Rembrandt's own work, there are also areas where this is less evident. The Netherlands Institute for Art History attributes the painting to Rembrandt and his workshop, or to Rembrandt's workshop.

== Provenance ==
The circumstances surrounding the painting's creation and its early provenance remain unknown. The first known owner with certainty was the French art collector, Count Sylvain Raphaël de Baudouin. Baudouin's collection, including this work, was sold to Empress Catherine II of Russia in 1780 or the following year, 1781. Subsequently, the painting was transferred to the Hermitage Museum in Saint Petersburg. In 1930, the Armenian businessman Calouste Gulbenkian acquired the work in Paris through the Antikvariat, an agency within the Soviet Ministry of Industry and Trade dealing in the sale and trade of artworks acquired from domestic museums. In 1942, Gulbenkian emigrated to Portugal to avoid World War II and died in Lisbon in 1955. Subsequently, the painting was acquired by the Calouste Gulbenkian Museum upon its establishment and became part of its collection.

== See also ==
- List of paintings by Rembrandt
