= Stranger churches =

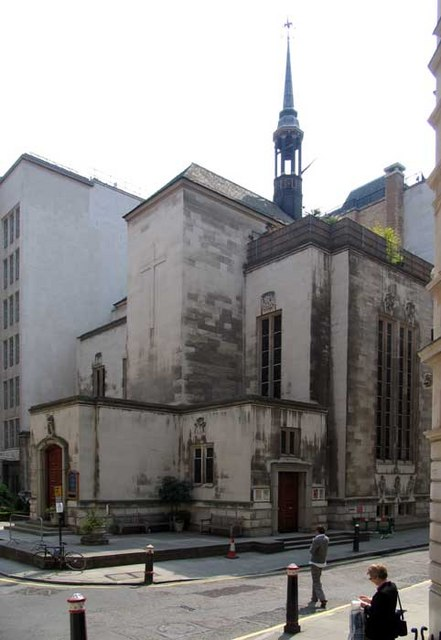
The Dutch Stranger Church in London.

Strangers' church was a term used by English-speaking people for independent Protestant churches established in foreign lands or by foreigners in England during the Reformation. (The spelling stranger church is also found in texts of the period and modern scholarly works.)

== English churches on the European continent ==
Many English churches sprang up in the Low Countries and Rhineland during the English Reformation. The most famous of these were established by the Marian exiles who fled Catholic persecution under Mary Tudor. Among these was the English Reformed Church, Amsterdam.

== The Stranger Churches in England ==
The first Stranger Church to be set up in England was that led by the Italian reformer, Bernardino Ochino in 1547 (Cranmer's permission coming in January 1548). Although set up for the Italian community in London, it welcomed reformed Protestants of other nationalities as well. In 1550, there were three congregations - Dutch, French and Italian. To the dismay of bishop of London Nicholas Ridley, the fully independent congregations - from now known as one Stranger's Church received a royal charter and was incorporated by letters patent on 24 July 1550. The founder and first superintendent was Polish reformer John a Lasco. For the new community he wrote two fundamental writings - Confessio Londinensis, containing principles of faith, and Forma ac ratio, containing structure and rites.

They received help of Protestant aristocrats such as William Cecil and Katherine Brandon, Duchess of Suffolk.

The congregation received a grant of the Austin or Augustinian Friars Church which remains the site of the city's Dutch Protestant Church, the church itself having been destroyed in World War II. Upon incorporation, the church was renamed the "Temple of the Lord Jesus" and given four pastors: two for the Dutch church, and two for the French/Walloon church meeting in St. Anthony's Chapel. Today the French Protestant Church of London worships in a chapel on Soho Square.

Cranmer's main purposes in giving official sanction to the Churches seem to have been two-fold. Firstly, they provided a glimpse of how a reformed Protestant Church might work in England, within the episcopal system which many of the "hotter" reformers wished to abolish. Secondly, and perhaps more importantly, they helped Cranmer and his allies in the suppression of heretical strains of religion, such as the non-Trinitarian George van Parris.

== Members of London's Dutch Stranger Church ==
- John a Lasco, first superintendent of the church
- Marten Micron, first pastor of the church
- Steven Mierdman, printer (pseud. Niclaes van Oldenborch), joined the church in 1550
- Justus Velsius, dissident, joined the church in 1563 until expelled from the kingdom

== See also ==
- Marian exiles
- English Reformed Church, Amsterdam
- French Protestant Church of London
- Dutch Church, Austin Friars
