= George van Parris =

Dutch Arian executed for heresy (died 1551)

George van Parris (died 1551) was a Dutch Arian, who was burnt at the stake in London having been excommunicated by his fellow Dutchmen for denying that Jesus Christ was God.

George van Parris attended one of the Stranger churches, which were congregations of European Christians, where he was excommunicated and his remains denied a Christian burial by being burned, presumably with the knowledge of the Polish superintendent over the various congregations, John Lasco. Edward VI, who permitted the foreign congregations to hold services, wrote in his diary, "A certain Arian, of the strangers, a Dutchman, being excommunicated by the congregation, was, after long disputation, condemned to the fire."

== Life ==
He was said to have been born in Flanders; but is also described by Robert Wallace as of "Mentz" in the Grand Duchy of Hesse. He was a surgeon, and the law of 1531 enabled foreign surgeons in England to enjoy a larger liberty of opinion than native surgeons enjoyed. He became naturalised 29 October 1550, and was a member for a time of the Dutch Church in Austin Friars, London.

After the death of Joan Bocher, who had denied the humanity of Christ, moves were taken against the spread of unitarian opinions. A commission was issued on 18 January 1551, and Van Parris, having been arrested, was formally examined on 6 April. The Dutch church excommunicated him, and on 7 April he was condemned. His offence was the denial of the divinity of Christ. Edward VI, in his Journal: Van Parris knew little or no English, and Miles Coverdale interceded as his interpreter. A man without prior offences, efforts were made to secure a pardon for him. He was, however, burnt, on 25 April 1551, in Smithfield.
