= Walter Deloenus =

Dutch Anabaptist scholar (c. 1500–1563)

Wouter Deelen (English: Walter Deloenus, Latin: Gualterus Delenus, French: Gualtier Delvin) (c. 1500–1563) was a Dutch Anabaptist, Greek and Hebrew scholar, for a time librarian of Henry VIII, and then preacher at the Dutch church in London.

== Biography ==
Wouter Deelen was born in Balen in the province of Antwerp in Brabant. He made a trip to Wittenberg in 1522. Following studies at the University of Leuven he taught Greek and Hebrew at the University of Haarlem 1523-1527, then from July 1533 was the first professor of Greek and Hebrew at the University of Amsterdam. Due to an interpretation of John 6:51b, he was accused of Anabaptist heresy, and removed on 1 May 1535. Nine days later 10 May 1535 Anabaptist uprising in Amsterdam occurred, after which Deelen was discovered to have met in secret with radical Anabaptist leaders including Jan van Geelen, although it is possible that Deelen's role was as a mediator.

In 1535 he fled to England, later becoming a librarian to Henry VIII, and working on a revision of the Latin New Testament of Erasmus. This he published under the Latin name Galterus Deloenus: Testamentum Novum Latinum in 1540. In 1550 Edward VI appointed Deelen and Marten Micronius (c.1522-1559) as preachers of the Dutch refugee congregation at Austin Friars, where he worked with Polish Calvinist reformer Jan Łaski. It seems likely that Deelen was acquainted with Immanuel Tremellius and his student Christopher Carlisle at Cambridge, and may have been present at the latter's debate with Sir John Cheke on the doctrine of harrowing of Hell in 1552, since he published sharing Carlisle's view on removing the doctrine from the creeds.

Following the death of Edward VI (1553) aged 15, most of the Dutch, German and Polish Anabaptist community returned to the Low Countries. Deelen settled in Emden, Germany, where he worked with Jan Utenhove of Ghent on a translation of the New Testament into Dutch and edited the Dutch translation of reformation historian Johannes Sleidanus' De statu religionis commentarii. In 1559, a year after Elizabeth I succeeded Mary Tudor, Deelen returned to London, where he died in 1563.
