= Man in a Plumed Beret =

c. 1661 painting by Rembrandt

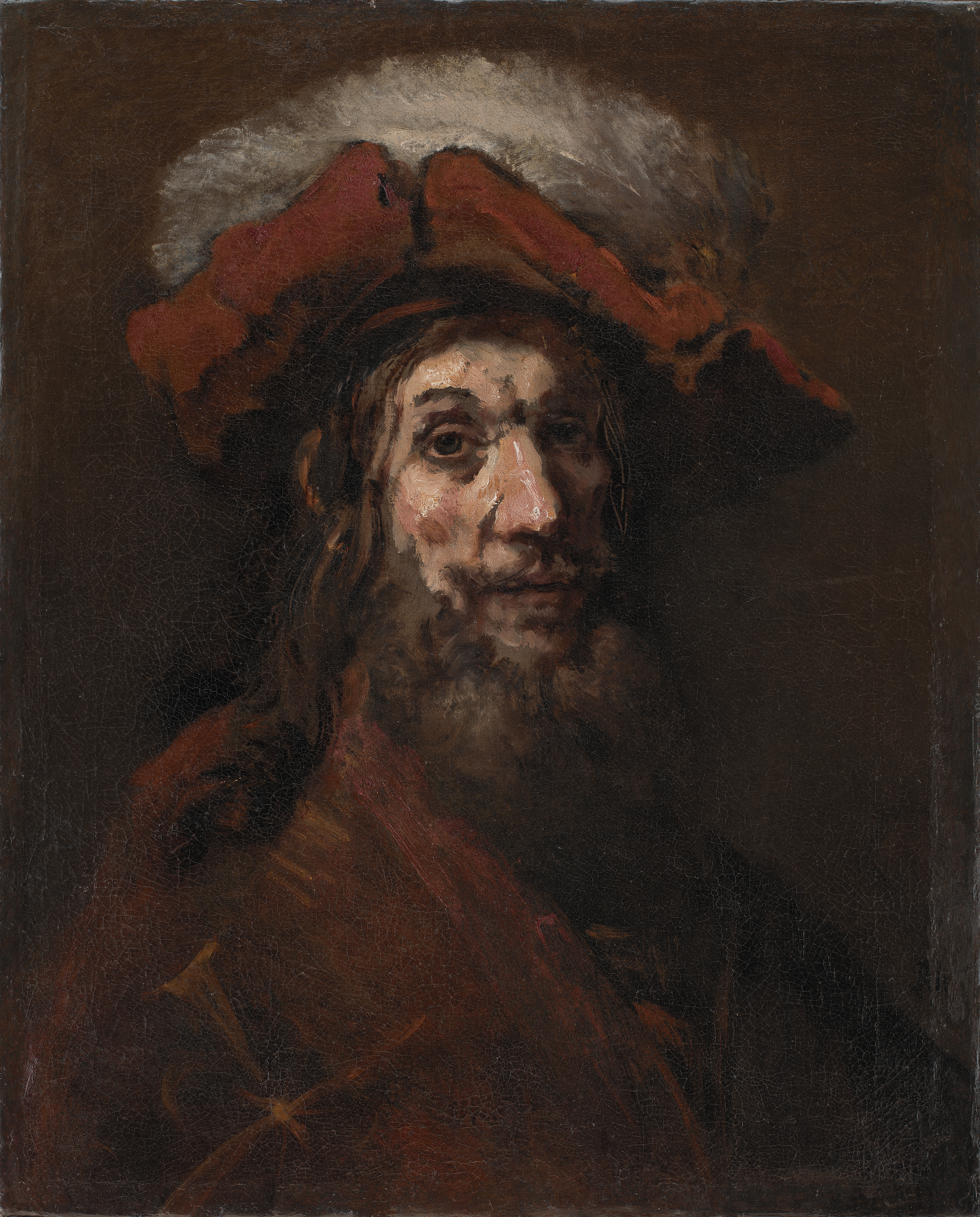
- Artist: Rembrandt
- Year: c. 1661
- Dimensions: 68.5 cm × 55.5 cm (27.0 in × 21.9 in)
- Location: Statens Museum for Kunst, Copenhagen
- Accession: KMS1384
- Website: Statens Museum for Kunst

Man in a Plumed Beret is a c. 1661 portrait painting painted by Rembrandt. It is an oil on canvas and is in the collection of the Statens Museum for Kunst.

== Description ==
This painting came into the collection in 1890 via the Fredensborg Castle collection, where it had been documented in 1814 and been since 1775.

This painting was documented by Hofstede de Groot in 1914, who wrote:

265. A CRUSADER. He is turned to the right, but looks at the

spectator. He wears a large slashed head-dress with a white plume, and a plain costume with a Maltese cross on the right shoulder. Half-length. Painted about 1655, according to Madsen. 26 1/2 inches by 20 inches. Mentioned by Karl Madsen, Billeder of Rembrandt, 1911, pp. 77, etc. In one of the Royal palaces, Copenhagen, probably since 1775, certainly since 1814.

In the Royal Gallery, Copenhagen.

In 1911 the Rembrandt scholar and then director of Statens Museum for Kunst, Karl Madsen, found The Crusader in a remote corner of Fredensborg Castle where it had been placed in temporary storage. Despite Karl Madsen's evident enthusiasm for the painting, and Hofstede de Groot's attribution, its status was called into question and rejected by Horst Gerson in 1969 as a Rembrandt. The most recent studies claim it is a sketch for The Knight with the Falcon in Sweden. The Swedish gallery agrees, stating "The same face appears in several paintings from the 1650s and 1660s: from Aristotle Contemplating a Bust of Homer (1653, Metropolitan Museum of Art, New York), A Bearded Man in a Cap (late 1650s, National Gallery, London), and Portrait of a Bearded Man (1661, Hermitage Museum, St Petersburg)... There is an oil sketch for the painting, The Crusader (National Gallery of Denmark, Copenhagen), in which the same model wears similar headgear but a red cloak.

The Knight with the Falcon, GKM 0698, (Gothenburg Museum of Art).

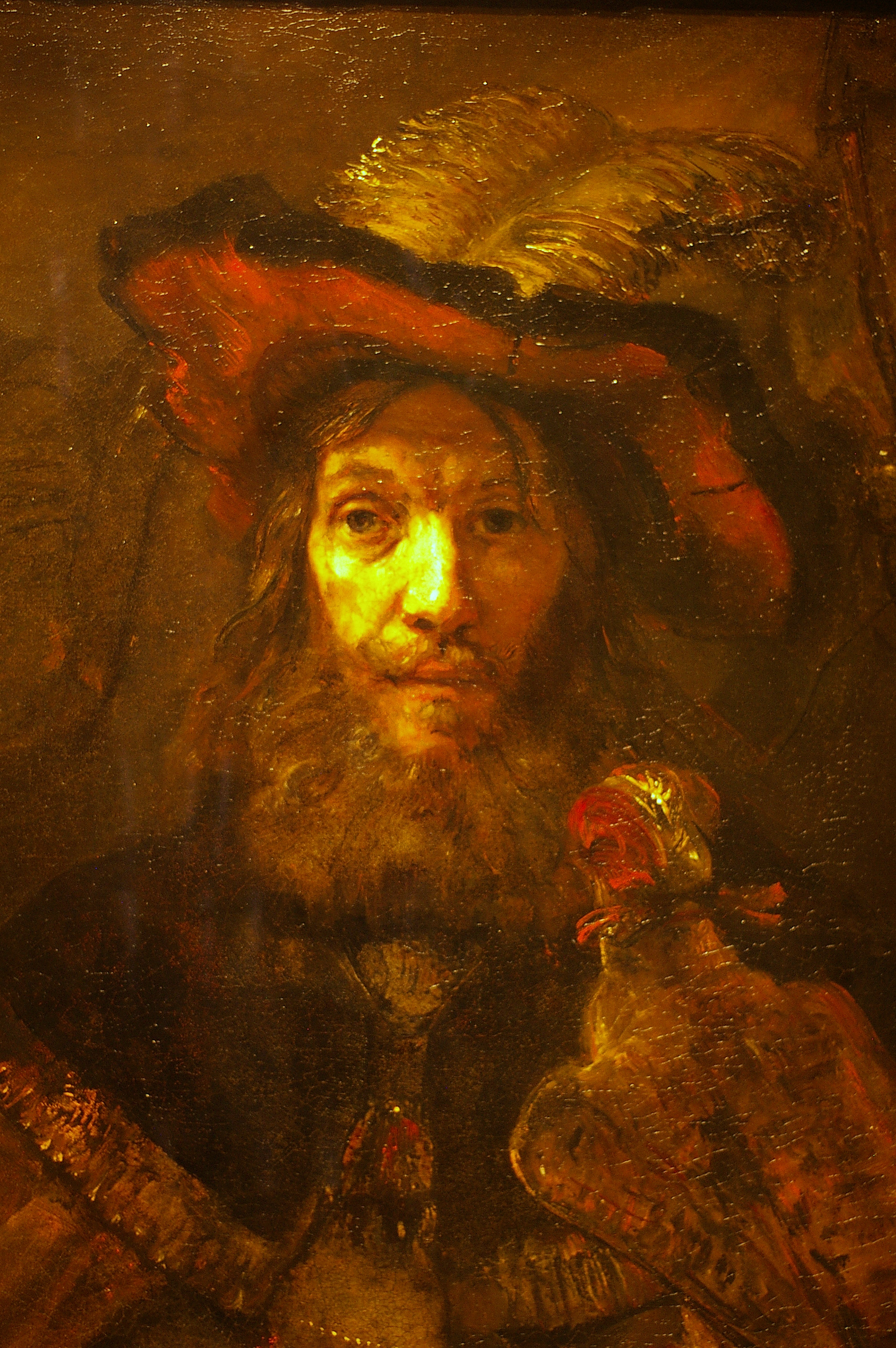
Detail of the head

== See also ==
- List of paintings by Rembrandt
