= Dutch Church, Austin Friars =

Dutch reformed church in London, England

Coordinates: 51°30′56″N 0°5′8″W

- Nederlandse Kerk Londen
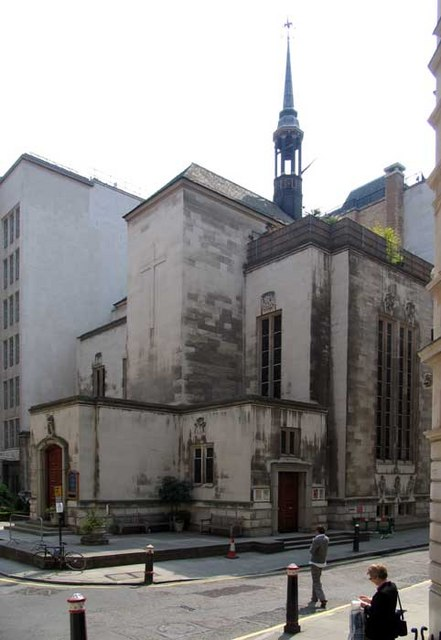
- The world's oldest Dutch reformed church
- Dutch Church, Austin Friars
- OS grid reference: TQ 32929 81357
- Location: 7 Austin Friars, London
- Country: England
- Language: Dutch
- Denomination: Protestant Church in the Netherlands
- Website: www.dutchchurch.org.uk

History
- Founded: 24 July 1550; 476 years ago

Architecture
- Architect: Sir Arthur Bailey
- Style: Modernist, New Classicism
- Years built: 1354; 672 years ago, rebuilt 1950–1954; 72 years ago
- Demolished: 15–16 October 1940; 85 years ago

The Dutch Church, Austin Friars (Dutch: Nederlandse Kerk Londen), is a reformed church in the Broad Street Ward, in the City of London. Located on the site of the 13th-century Augustinian friary, the original building granted to Protestant refugees for their church services in 1550 was destroyed during the London Blitz of 1940.

The present church was built between 1950 and 1954 and is a familiar landmark in the Broad Street Ward. With the founding of the church dating to 1550, it is the oldest Dutch-language Protestant church in the world, and as such is known in the Netherlands as the mother church of all Dutch reformed churches.

== History ==
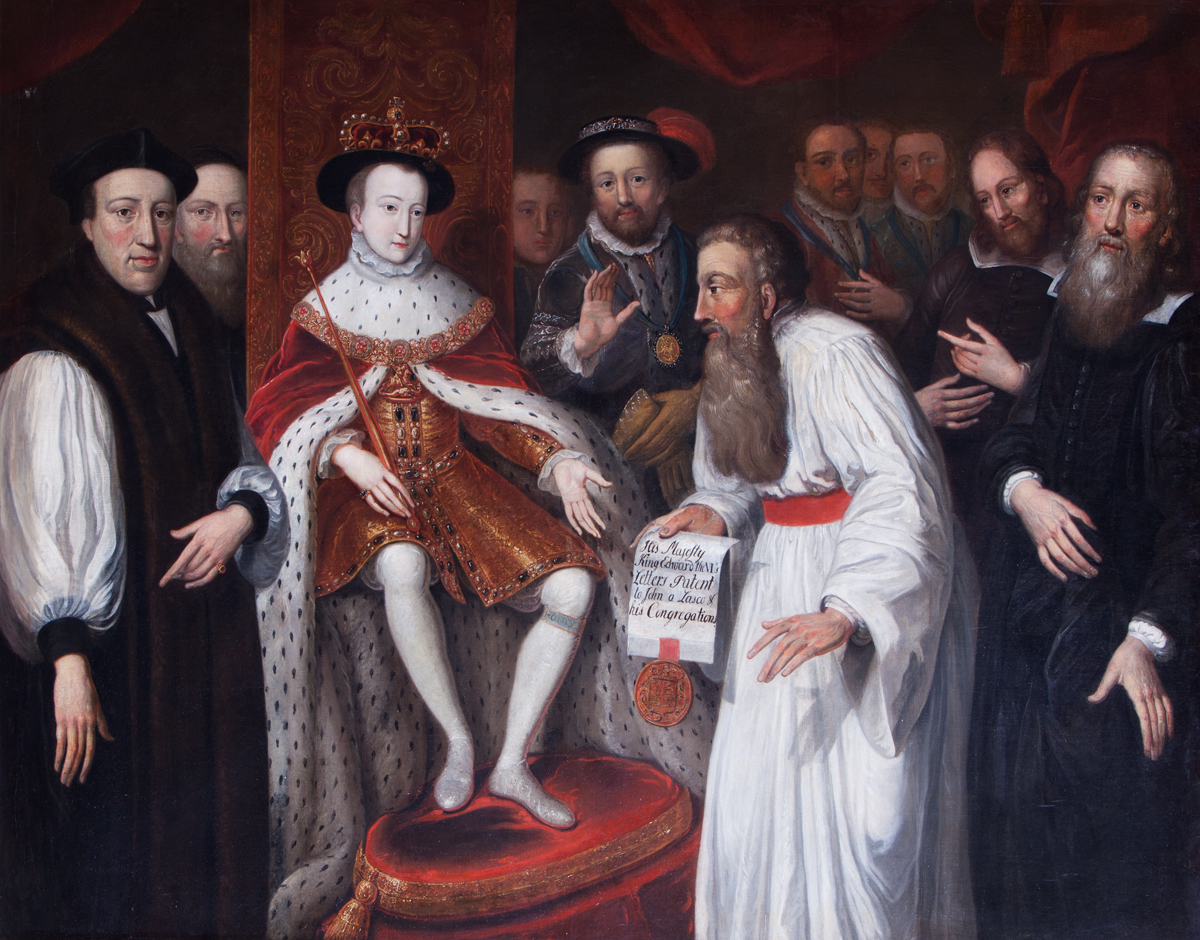
Edward VI Granting Permission to John a Lasco to Set Up a Congregation for European Protestants in London in 1550, attributed to Johann Valentin Haidt (1700–1780)

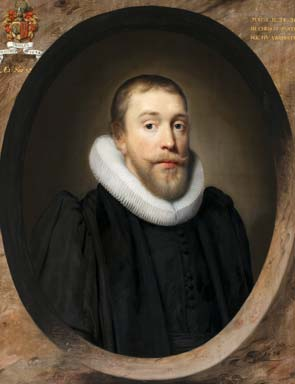
Portrait of Willem Thielen, minister of the Dutch Church, 1634 by Cornelis Janssens van Ceulen

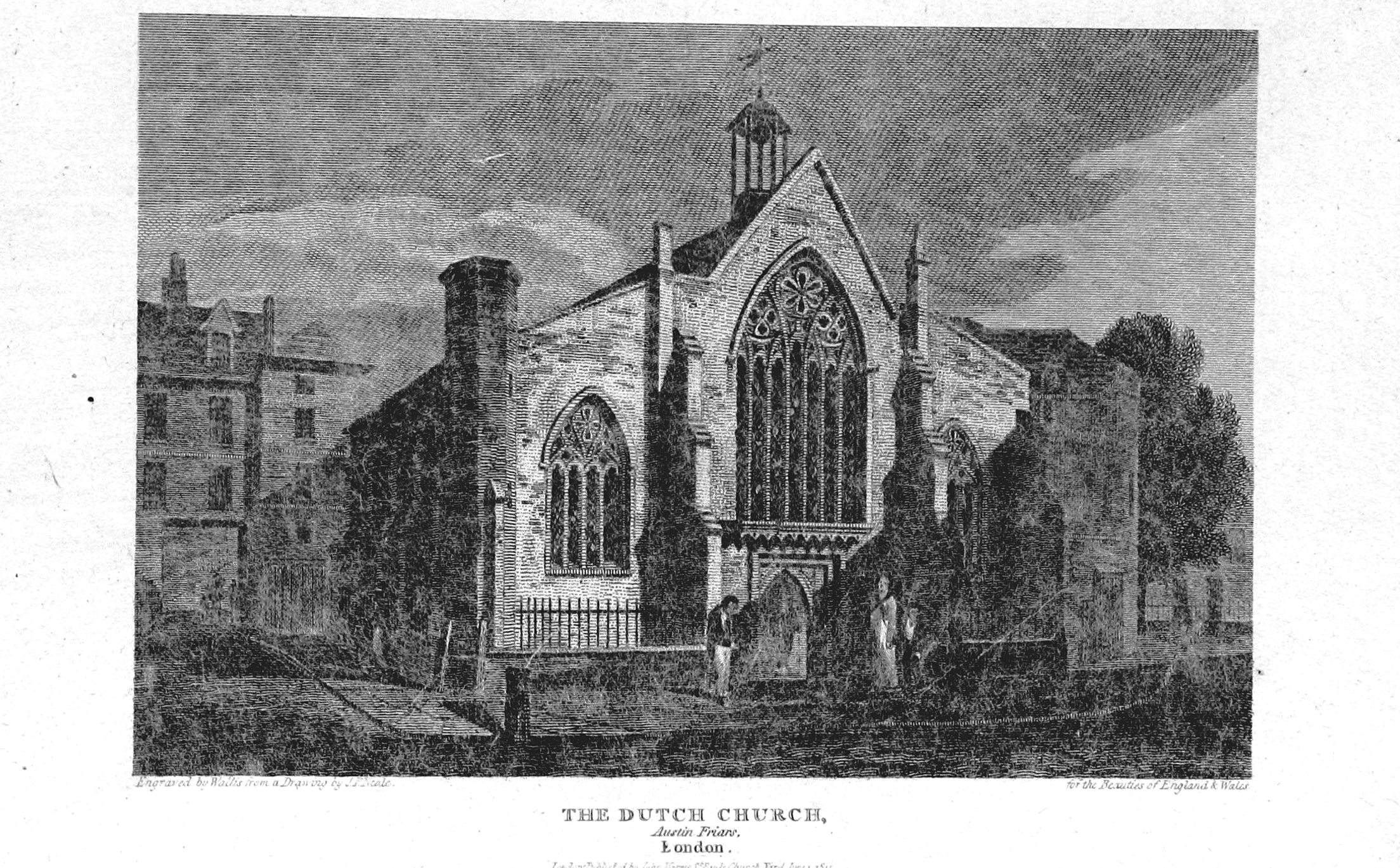
The Dutch Church (1820) by Edward Wedlake Brayley from A Topographical and Historical Description of London and Middlesex

The original church was a monastic priory known as the Austin Friars, London, a contraction of "Augustinian Friars", founded c. 1253 by Humphrey de Bohun, 2nd Earl of Hereford (d. 1275). The pretender Perkin Warbeck, executed on 23 November 1499 for claiming to be Richard of Shrewsbury, the younger of the Princes in the Tower, is buried in the church. The priory was dissolved in November 1538. The City of London attempted to buy the church of the friary from the Crown in 1539 and again in 1546 but was rebuffed. In 1550, London's community of "Germans and other strangers" was granted the use of the friary church's nave; the rest of the church was used as a storehouse, with the monuments sold for £100 and the lead stripped from the roof. The choir, tower and transepts were demolished in 1600.

The nave became the first official nonconformist chapel in England under its Polish-born superintendent John a Lasco (known in Poland as Jan Łaski) who had founded a preaching house for a group of Protestant refugees mainly from the Low Countries. The mostly Dutch- and French-speaking “strangers” were granted a royal charter on 24 July 1550 that allowed them to establish a Stranger Church, and this was incorporated by letters patent from King Edward VI. Upon incorporation, the church was named the "Temple of the Lord Jesus" and had four pastors: two for Dutch and two for the French-Walloon who by the 1580s had begun using St Anthony's Chapel in Threadneedle Street.

By 1570, the Dutch community was the largest group of expatriates in London, numbering 5,000 out of the 100,000 total population of the time. About half of the Dutch in London were Protestants who fled the Flemish Low Countries due to religious persecution. Others were skilled craftsman, including brewers, tile makers, weavers, artists, printers and engravers, who came to England for economic opportunities. Engraver Martin Droeshout, famous for his 1623 portrait of William Shakespeare, was among the Flemish Protestant emigrants who arrived in London. Similarly, engravers Jodocus Hondius and Colette van den Keere fled to London, who married in the Dutch Church in 1587.

A century later, the arrival of William of Orange brought a second wave of Dutch emigrants to London. This second group included noblemen, bankers, courtiers, merchants, architects and artists.

== 20th century ==
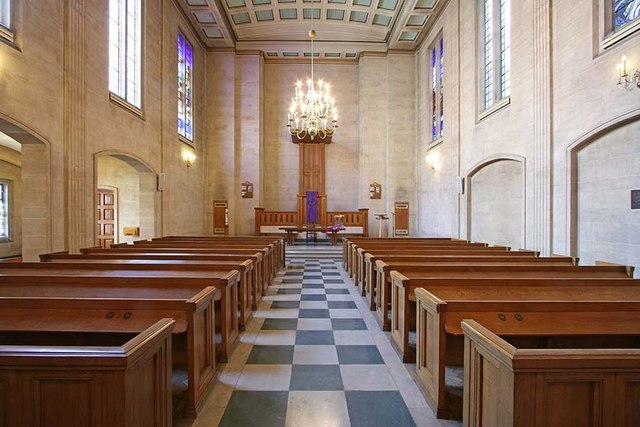
Interior view towards the East

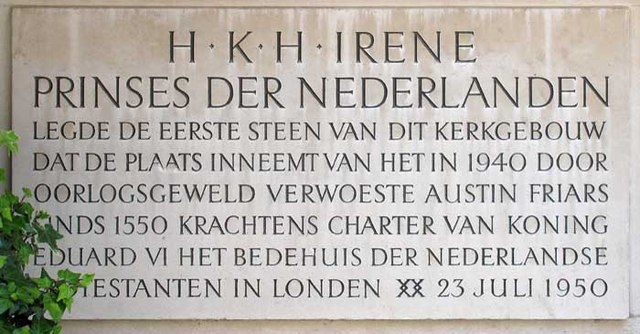
The foundation stone of the new church

In the night of 15–16 October 1940, just a decade before the Dutch Church celebrated its 400th anniversary, the medieval building was completely destroyed by German bombs. The church's collection of rare books including Dutch Bibles, atlases, and encyclopaedias had been moved out of London for safe-keeping one day before the bombing raid that destroyed the building. The church's manuscript collection and original charter are kept in the London Metropolitan Archives. The church's library collection is currently being digitalised, but, by April 2021, the online catalogue remained unpublished.

The foundation stone of the new church was laid on 23 July 1950 by the 10-year-old Princess Irene of the Netherlands. The new church, built to the design of Arthur Bailey, was completed in 1954. The new building is a concrete box frame, externally clad in Portland stone. It features 1950s stained glass by the Dutch painter Max Nauta, Hugh Ray Easton and William Wilson. The church possesses detailed archives, and is a popular tourist attraction.

The church was designated a Grade-II listed building on 25 September 1998. In 2000, the church celebrated its 450th anniversary; Prof. Keetie E. Sluyterman at the University of Utrecht published a book about the church and its history, De Kerk in de City.

== 21st century ==
The church remains active today, with weekly Dutch-language church services, confirmation classes, and meetings for various groups. The church also does outreach to the Dutch community in London, including ministering to the elderly.

The church is home to two other UK registered charities: The Netherlands Benevolent Society (NBS) and The Dutch Centre. On 24 April 2015, Princess Beatrix of the Netherlands was honorary guest in the Dutch Church for a jubilee celebration to mark 150 years since the founding of the NBS. On the same day the Dutch Centre was officially opened by Laetitia van den Assum, Ambassador of the Netherlands to the United Kingdom, Liesbeth Knook, Chairman of the Church Council, and Paul Beiboer, General Manager of London branch of Rabobank.

In April 2014, the minister of the church, Rev. Joost Röselaers, confirmed that the Dutch Church was able to perform weddings for same-sex couples.

== Members of the Dutch Stranger Church ==
- Cornelis Bol, Flemish painter
- Lucas de Heere, Flemish painter, elder of the church
- Cornelis Janssens van Ceulen, painter
- John a Lasco, first superintendent of the church
- Marten Micron, first pastor of the church
- Steven Mierdman, printer (pseudonym Niclaes van Oldenborch), joined the church in 1550
- George van Parris, surgeon, burned in London for heresy on 25 April 1551
- Jan Utenhove, writer, elder of the church
- Justus Velsius, dissident, joined the church in 1563

== See also ==
- English Reformed Church, Amsterdam
- Stranger churches
- Susanne van Soldt Manuscript
