= Casembroot =

Casembroot (de Casembroot, van Casembroot) is a last name. Notable people with this last name include:

- Abraham Casembroot (c. 1593–1658), Dutch painter
- François de Casembroot (1817–1895), Royal Netherlands Navy officer
- Jacques de Casembroot (1903–1988), Belgian film director and screenwriter
- Jan van Casembroot (c. 1525–1568), Flemish noble and poet
