= Cornelis Bol =

Cornelis Bol (baptised 15 July 1589 – buried 23 October 1666) was a Flemish painter and etcher, periodically active in England. He is sometimes known as "Cornelis Bol IV" to differentiate him from other artists of the same name including Cornelis Bol I, more generally known as "Cornelis Boel".

== Life ==
Bol was born in Antwerp where he was active until 1624. The next few years he painted in Paris. He moved to London in the 1630s. He and his wife are recorded as members of the Dutch Church in London in 1636. He returned to the Low Countries before 1642 when he organized an auction of paintings and prints in Haarlem. He probably remained in Haarlem until after 1649, when he was registered there as a member of the Guild of Saint Luke.

He painted a series of views of the Thames for John Evelyn, a version of one of which, The Thames from Somerset House, is in the collection of the Dulwich Picture Gallery He made a set of five engravings after Abraham Casembroot, a Dutch artist based in Messina. Four show scenes of Italian harbours, but the other depicts Lambeth Palace in London.

Bol is said to have been in London during the Great Fire in September 1666, but he died in Haarlem later that year, and was buried in the Janskerk there on 23 October.
