= Christopher Carlile =

Anglican clergyman

Christopher Carlile (or Carlisle) (ca. 1520–1588) was an Anglican clergyman.

Born around 1520, he studied at Clare College University of Cambridge, MA 1541, elected proctor 1548, BD 1552, then fellow of Clare College and DD. By 1563 he was at Monk's Horton, Kent, 1571 rectory of Hackney, which was vacant by his death 2 August 1588. Carlisle studied under Immanuel Tremellius and was an "excellent Hebrew scholar". In the year of his graduation, 1552, probably as many emboldened by the tolerant climate under the young Edward VI's regent John Dudley, 1st Earl of Warwick, Carlile held a debate with Sir John Cheke in which Carlisle denied the Christ's descent into hell. Carlile's denial of the descent into Hell had been anticipated by William Tyndale, and within his own lifetime was shared by Wouter Deelen (Gualterus Delenus) pastor of the Dutch church at Austin Friars, and another Hebrew scholar. Since Wouter Deelen had been first Hebrew professor at Amsterdam, and Tremellius was, at the time of the debate, professor of Hebrew at Cambridge, it is probable that both men were among Carlile's audience on the occasion. Tremellius and Deelen both left England when the young Edward VI died, aged 15, the next summer. They may have taken notes of the debate with them and published them in some form, or at least evidently some form of transcript of the debate must have found its way to Europe since ten years later Carlile found himself the joint target of a refutation by former Oxford scholar Richard Smyth (Regius Professor) (Louvain 1562), in a second section of a tract where Carlile had the honour of sharing the title with non-other than Jean Calvin. Carlile's origins are obscure, but we know more about the family that descended from him. He married Jane or Mary Hales, daughter of sir James Hales of Dungeon in Canterbury, Kent. Her first husband was Walter Mantell of Monks Horton, Kent, who was executed in 1554 for his part in Wyatt's Rebellion. Through his wife, Carlile was related both to Barnabe Googe, through Walter Mantell's sister Margaret, and to Alexander Neville, through his sister Anne. Christopher and Jane or Mary Hales had three children : Jonathan Carlile of Barham; capt. James Carlile, who died in Ireland; Anne (b. 1567); and Jane (b. 1569).

== Works ==
- 1552–1562 (some earlier version of the 1582 discourse is assumed)
- 1572 Discourse proving that Peter was never at Rome.
- 1582 Discourse on two divine positions - Concerning the immediate going to heaven of souls of the faithful fathers before Christ and concerning his descent into hell
- 1573 manuscript translation of the Psalms from Hebrew into English (MS Ff 5.6).
- Letter to Sebastian Castellio
- Various Latin verses prefixed to various publications of other writers.
