= The Knight with the Falcon =

c. 1661 painting by Rembrandt

- Artist: Rembrandt
- Year: c. 1661
- Dimensions: 98.5 cm × 79 cm (38.8 in × 31 in)
- Location: Gothenburg Museum of Art, Gothenburg
- Accession: GKM 0698
- Website: Gothenburg Museum of Art

The Knight with the Falcon is a c. 1661 portrait painting painted by Rembrandt. It is an oil on canvas and is in the collection of the Gothenburg Museum of Art.

== Description ==
This painting came into the collection in 1921 as a gift from the wealthy textile merchant Gustaf Werner and other museum patrons.

This painting was documented by Hofstede de Groot in 1914, who wrote:

287. A Sportsman with a Hawk on his Left Wrist. He wears

a large cloak of brown velvet with a black collar falling like a "pelerine" or long cape on the shoulders and the green doublet. On his breast is a double gold chain, below which hangs a knight's cross. Beneath this is the girdle, in which rests the thumb of the gloved right hand. The man wears a large broad felt hat with a red velvet lining and a large plume. Canvas, 39 1/2 inches by 32 inches. In the collection of Lord Coventry, London. Sales. George, Paris, 1853 (6100 francs) ; see C. Blanc, ii. 500.

Gilkinet, Paris, April 18, 1863, No. 85 (10,000 francs, bought in).

Despite Hofstede de Groot's attribution, its status was called into question but recent studies claim The Crusader in Copenhagen is a sketch for this painting. The Copenhagen gallery agrees, stating "The same face appears in several paintings from the 1650s and 1660s.

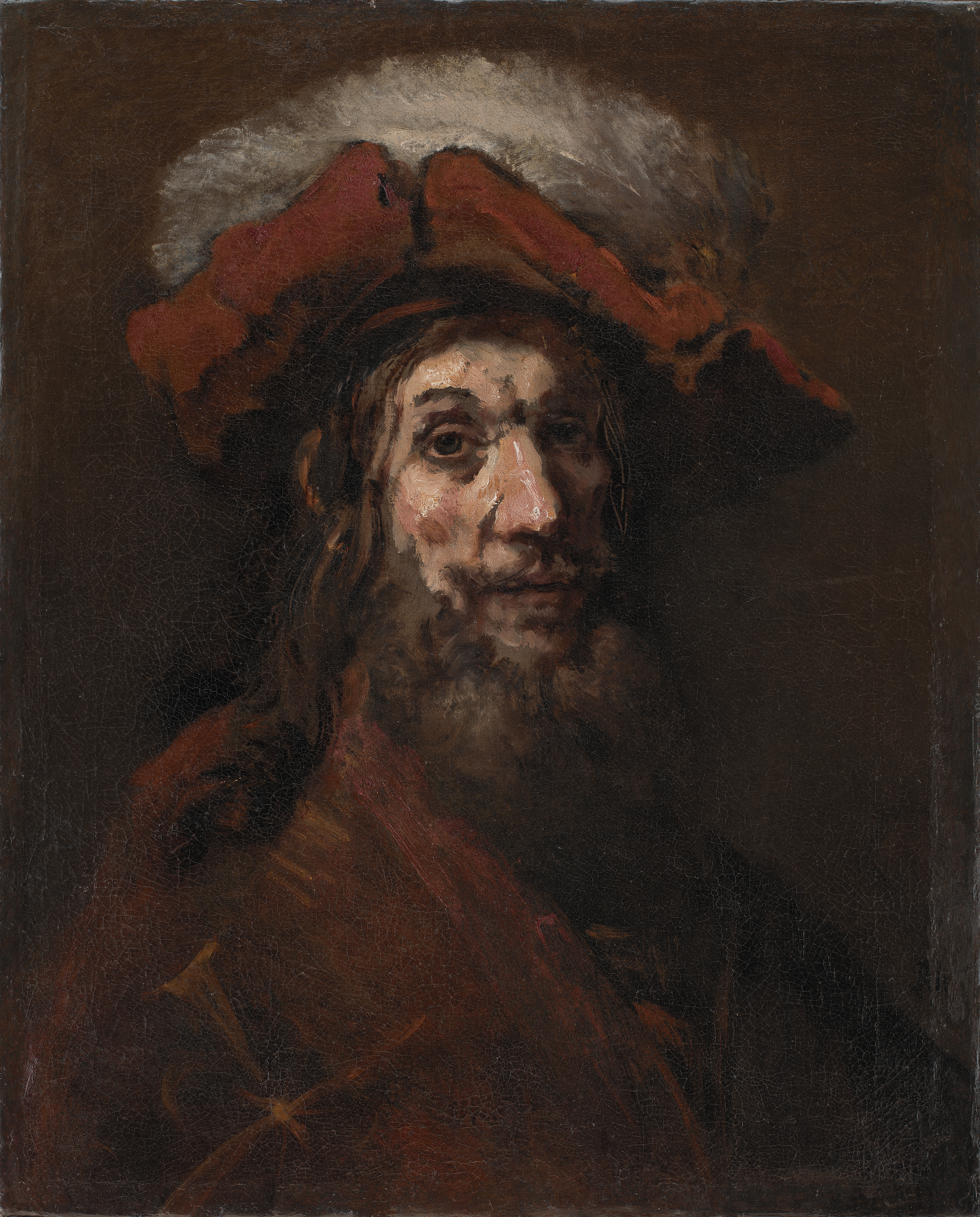
The Knight with the Falcon, KMS1384, (Statens Museum for Kunst).

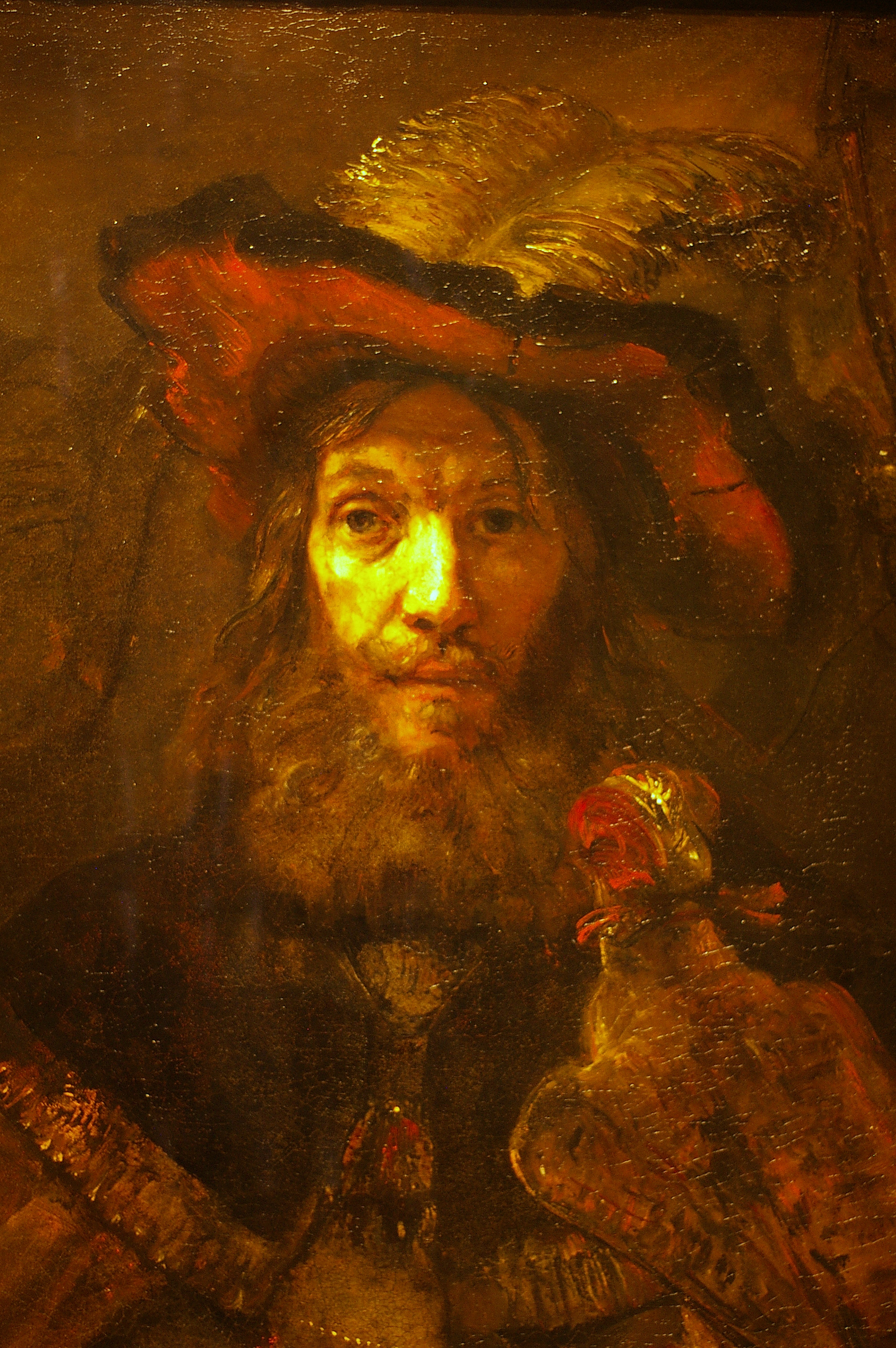
Detail of the head

== See also ==
- List of paintings by Rembrandt
