= Max Nauta =

Dutch painter (1896–1957)

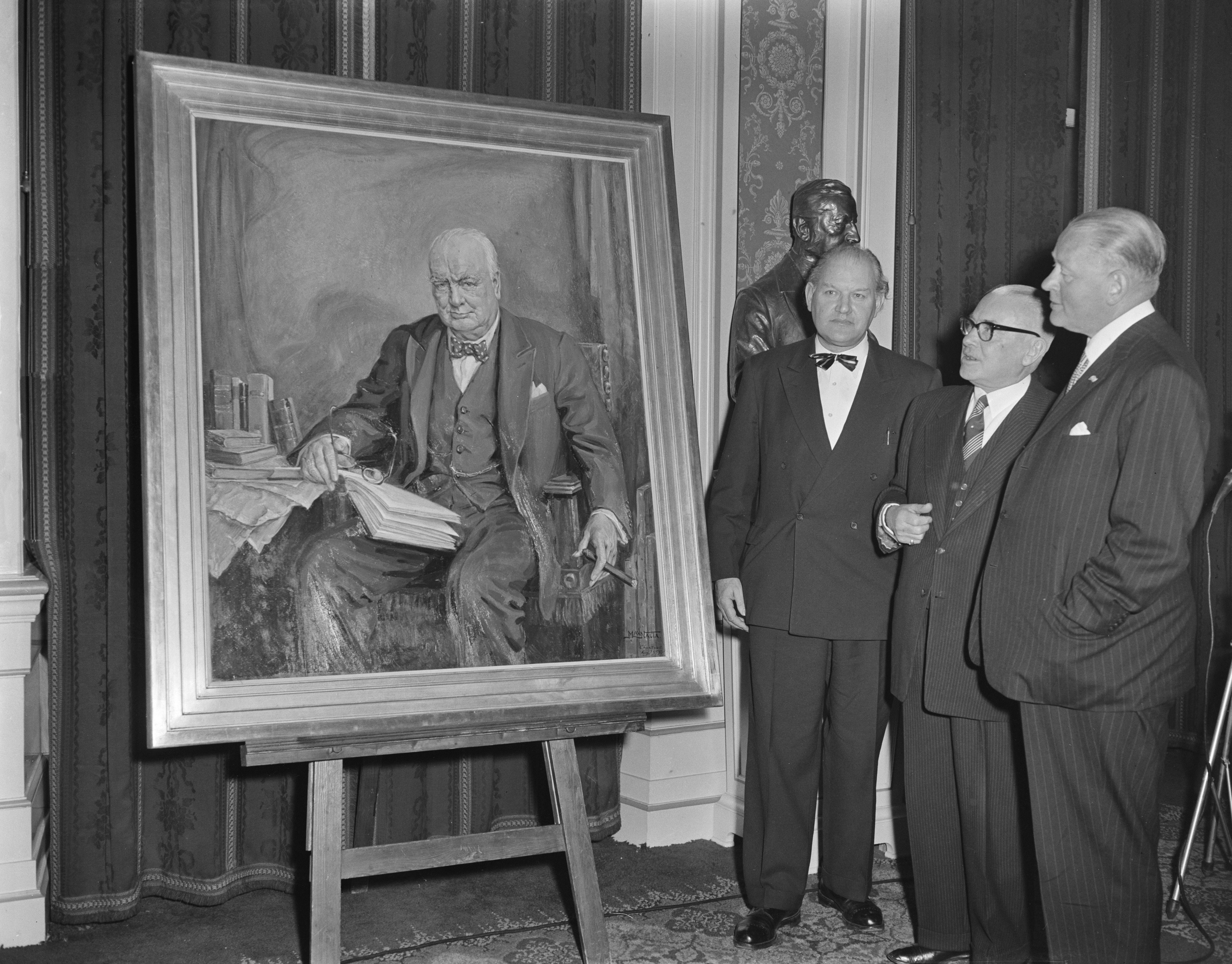
- Max Nauta (left) presents his painting of Winston Churchill (1956)
- Born: 2 April 1896; Deventer, Netherlands
- Died: 18 December 1957 (aged 61); Amsterdam, Netherlands
- Occupation: Painter

Marten Ykes "Max" Nauta (2 April 1896 – 18 December 1957) was a Dutch painter, especially noted for his portraits, and stained glass artist.

== Life ==
Nauta was born in Deventer, son of a baker, Yke Nauta (1865-1928), and his wife Mintje (née Schotanus). His father was a gifted self-taught painter, as was his father, Klaas Nauta (1825-1872), who painted some of the biers still to be seen in the Sint-Gertrudiskerk in Workum.

Nauta received his first drawing lessons from the architect L. Groen in Alkmaar, where he attended the craft school. Thanks to a bursary from Queen Wilhelmina he was able to study at the Rijksakademie van beeldende kunsten in Amsterdam, where he trained as a painter under professors Carel Dake, Nicolaas van der Waay, Antoon Derkinderen, Jan Six and Willem van der Pluym.

Travelling for further study, Nauta visited, among other places, Czechoslovakia, where he stayed for two years. He organised, on behalf of the Vereniging Van Gogh, the first exhibition there of Dutch art. He was received in the palace of the president, Tomáš Masaryk. He had contact with the Czech artists Alphonse Mucha, Max Svabinsky and Alois Bileck and the sculptor Jaroslav Horejc. In the mining town of Ústí nad Labem (Aussig a/d Elbe) he met Helene (Lene) Kettner, whom he married in 1926.

From 1926, back in Amsterdam, Nauta's work was influenced by George Hendrik Breitner, and later more by the Frenchmen Charles Daubigny and Carolus-Duran and the Englishman J. M. W. Turner. Nauta and his wife travelled a lot to visit foreign museums. He gained esteem from his powerful portraits inspired by the great English portraitists. After the liberation from German occupation in 1945 he received many prestigious commissions for official portraits, of which the high point was the portrait of Winston Churchill from 1955. In order to work on it he and his wife spent a few days at Chartwell, Churchill's country house, where Churchill posed for the painting. Protestantism and later freemasonry contributed to his spiritual formation. His love of Bohemian glass caused him to take up glass painting.

Nauta died in Amsterdam in 1957.

== Work and genres ==
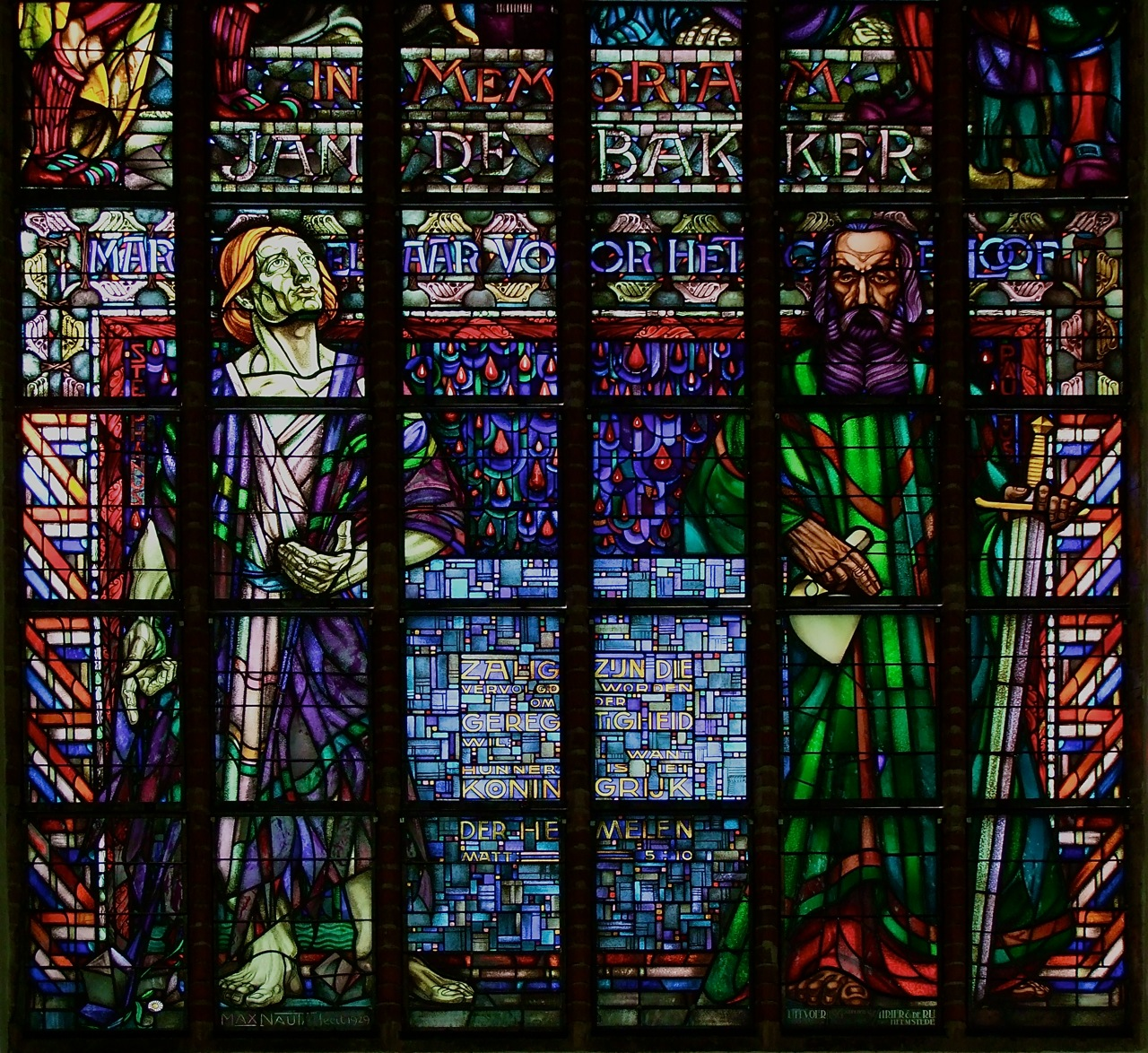
Stained glass memorial window of Jan de Bakker in the Sint-Jacobskerk (The Hague)

The oeuvre of Max Nauta can be divided into four categories:

- Paintings, sketches, etchings, watercolours and gouaches of monumental architecture, townscapes, landscapes - he was especially attracted by scenes at night or in snow
- Studies of folklore and folk characters in traditional costume of Friesland, North Holland and Czechoslovakia
- Portraits of members of the Dutch royal family, notables and other commissioning parties

Most notable portraits:

- Mayor Feike de Boer, 1946, in the main hall of the wedding rooms in the City Hall of Amsterdam
- Queen Wilhelmina, 1936, Princess Juliana and Prince Bernhard, 1937 (known from colour reproductions in De Telegraaf Jubilee book of 1938, portraits which survived the war in many households)
- State portrait of Queen Juliana, 1948, reproduced in the Elegance of April 1949
- Winston Churchill, 1955, located in the building of the Second Chamber of the States General in The Hague.

- Painted glass windows with historical figures and symbols from the Dutch Protestant tradition and freemasonry, spread throughout the Netherlands and England.

As a glass painter his feeling for symbolism and allegory came most into its own. He tried to achieve the radiance of the stained glass of the mediaeval cathedrals by using coloured glass as a background for the painting, in which the form and the meaning were paramount. As a result, his work rises beyond the level of art deco, of which it bears traces. For the technical execution of his designs he worked with various Haarlem glass workshops. His first commission came from the church board of the Low German Reformed Church Woerden in 1925. High points of his oeuvre as a glass artist are to be found in the Grote Kerk of The Hague (1930), the NCRV building at Hilversum, the Dutch Church, Austin Friars in London, the memorial windows of the Bataafse Petroleum Maatschappij in Amsterdam and the 18 windows of St. Andrew's Church, Roxbourne, Harrow, West London, England. This last commission represents the height of his metaphysically inspired work.

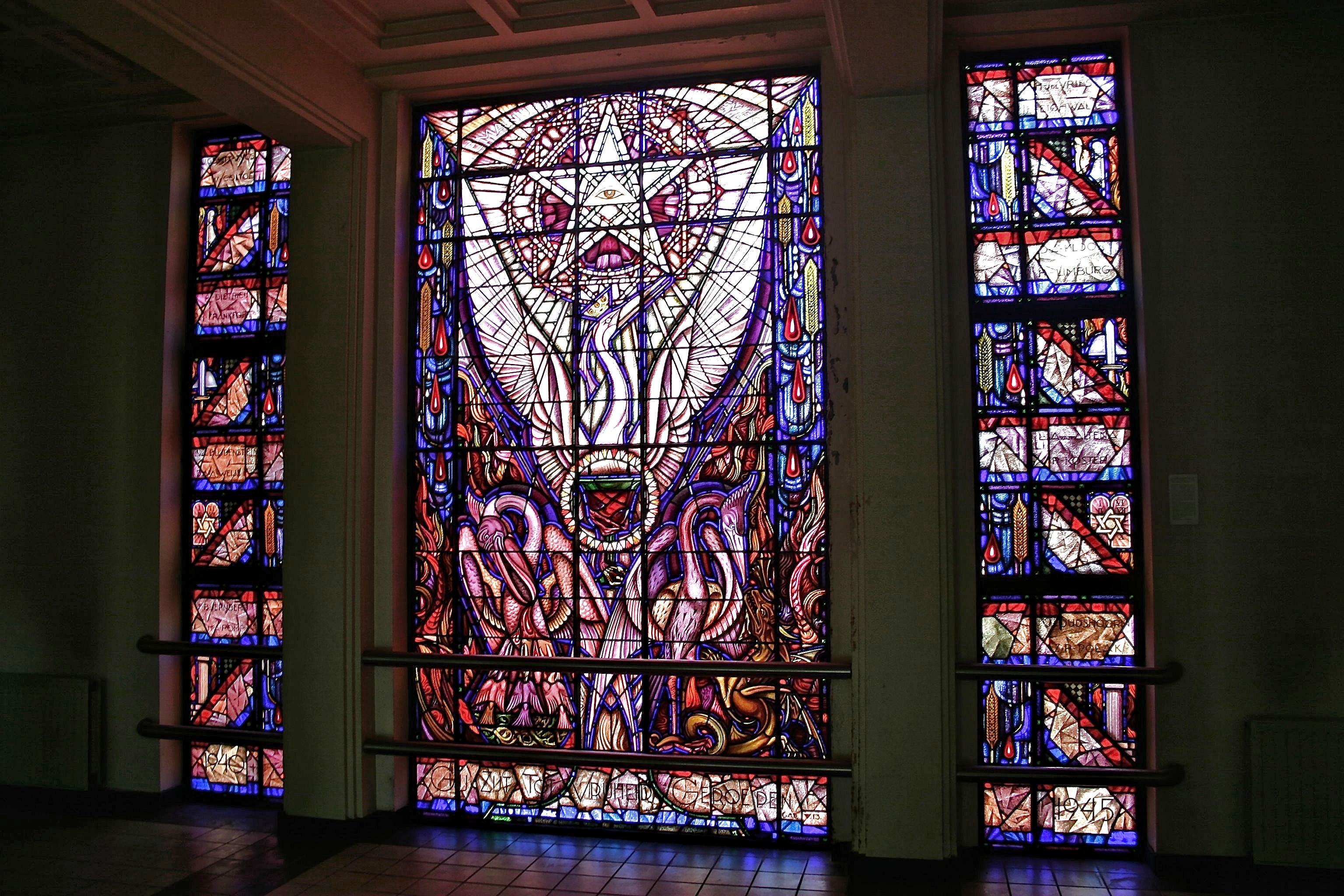
Window of remembrance, Shell laboratory

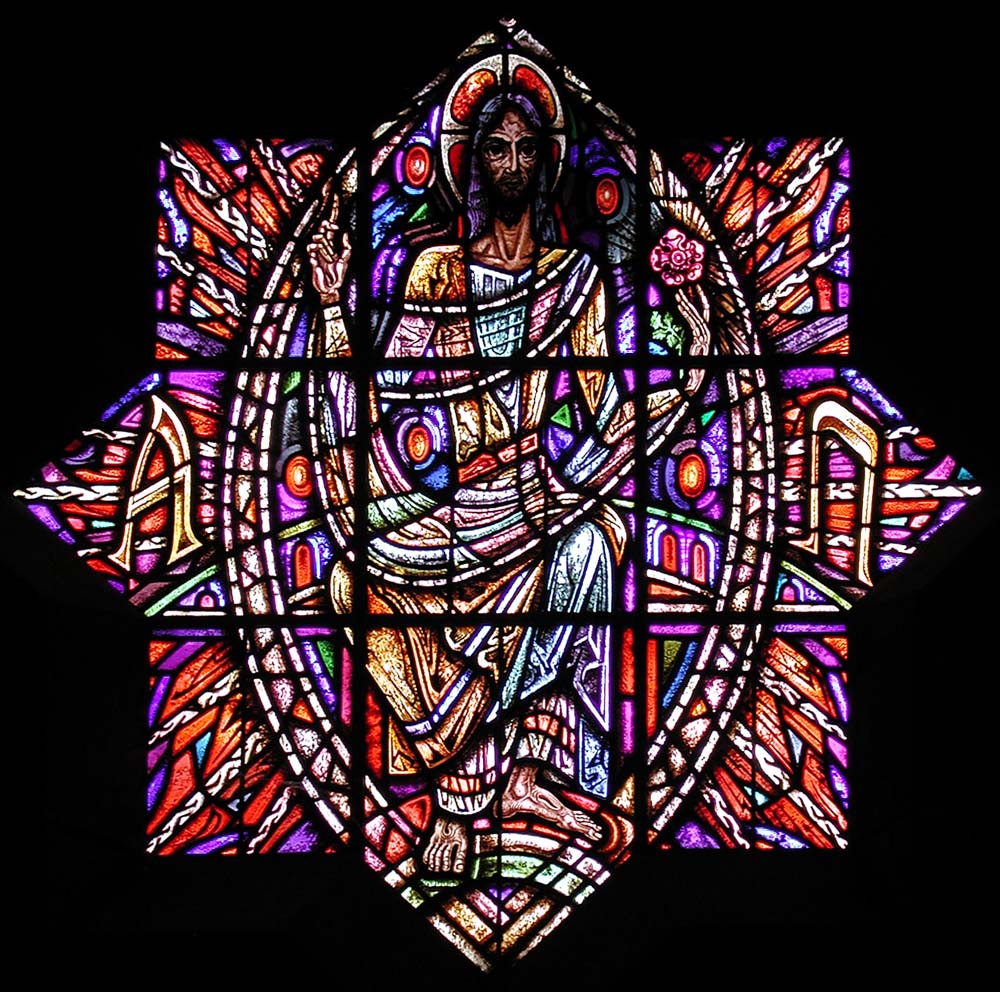
St. Andrew's Church, Roxbourne

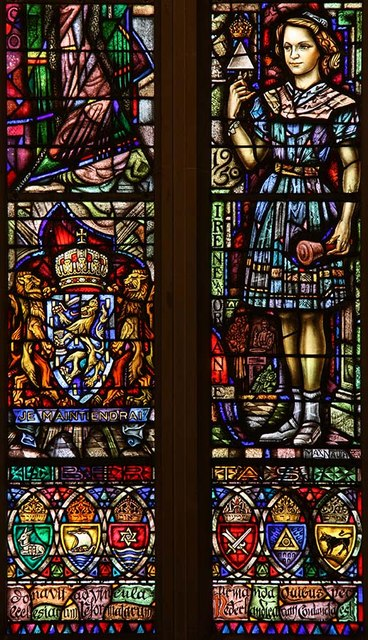
Austin Friars, London

His work was part of the painting event in the art competition at the 1924 Summer Olympics. Nauta's work was included in the 1939 exhibition and sale Onze Kunst van Heden (Our Art of Today) at the Rijksmuseum in Amsterdam.

== Collections ==
Works by Max Nauta are held in the following collections among others:

- Joods Historisch Museum, Amsterdam.
- Dutch royal family
- Het Loo Palace, Apeldoorn
- Amsterdam City Hall (Stadhuis)
- Second Chamber building, States General, The Hague

== Sources ==
- Jacobs, P.M.J.E., 2000: Beeldend Benelux: biografisch handboek, vol. 4, p. 406–407; Tilburg: Stichting Studiecentrum voor beeldende kunst
- Pluym, Willem van der; M. Muller; Emile van Loo: Max Nauta. Amsterdam, Het Hollandsche Uitgevershuis, 1948
- Scheen, Pieter A., 1969-1970: "Nauta, Max". In: Lexicon der Nederlandse Beeldende Kunstenaars, vol. 2, p. 95
