= Antonio Ruffo =

Sicilian nobleman

- Duke of Bagnara
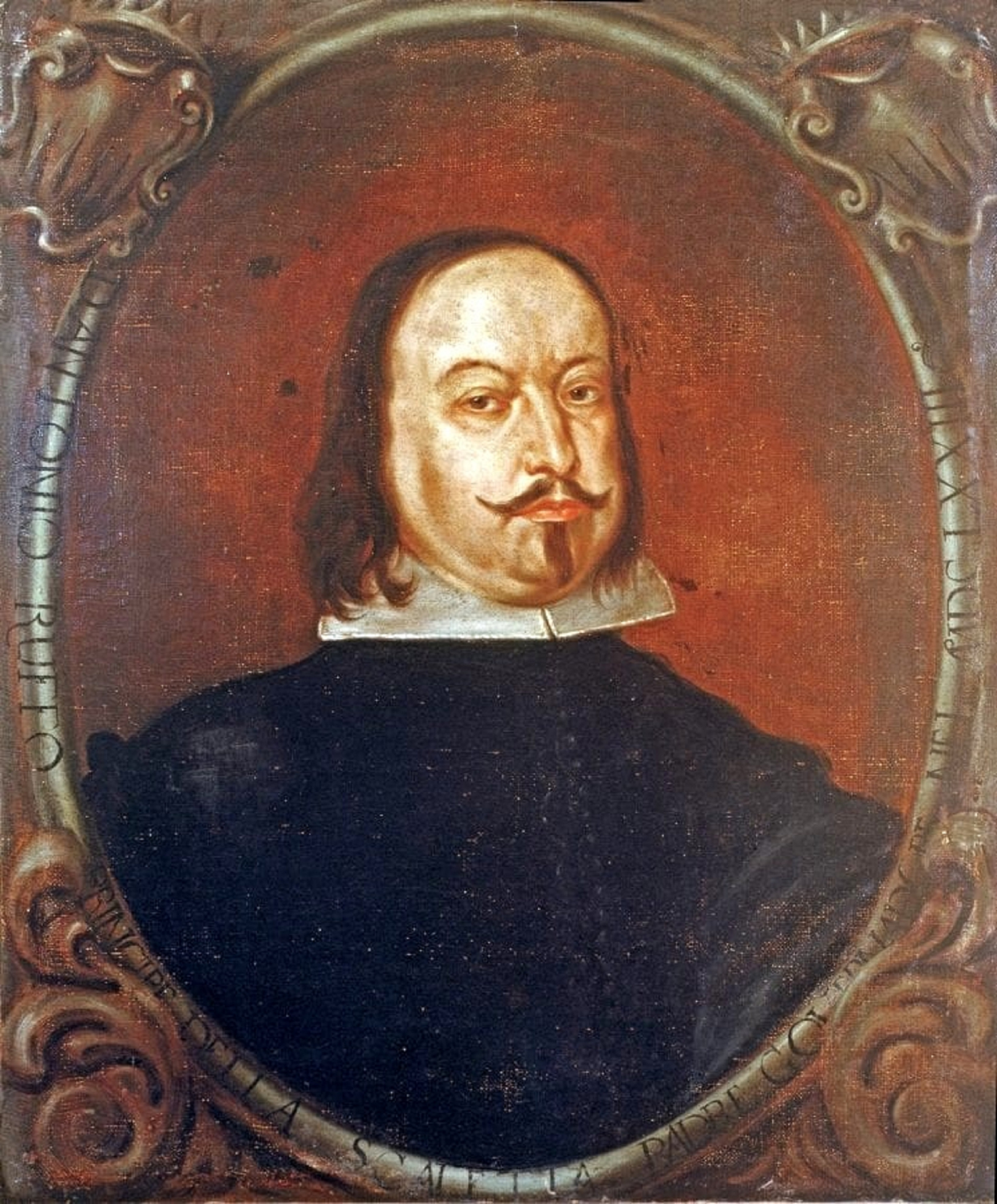
- Anonymous, Portrait of Antonio Ruffo, 1673

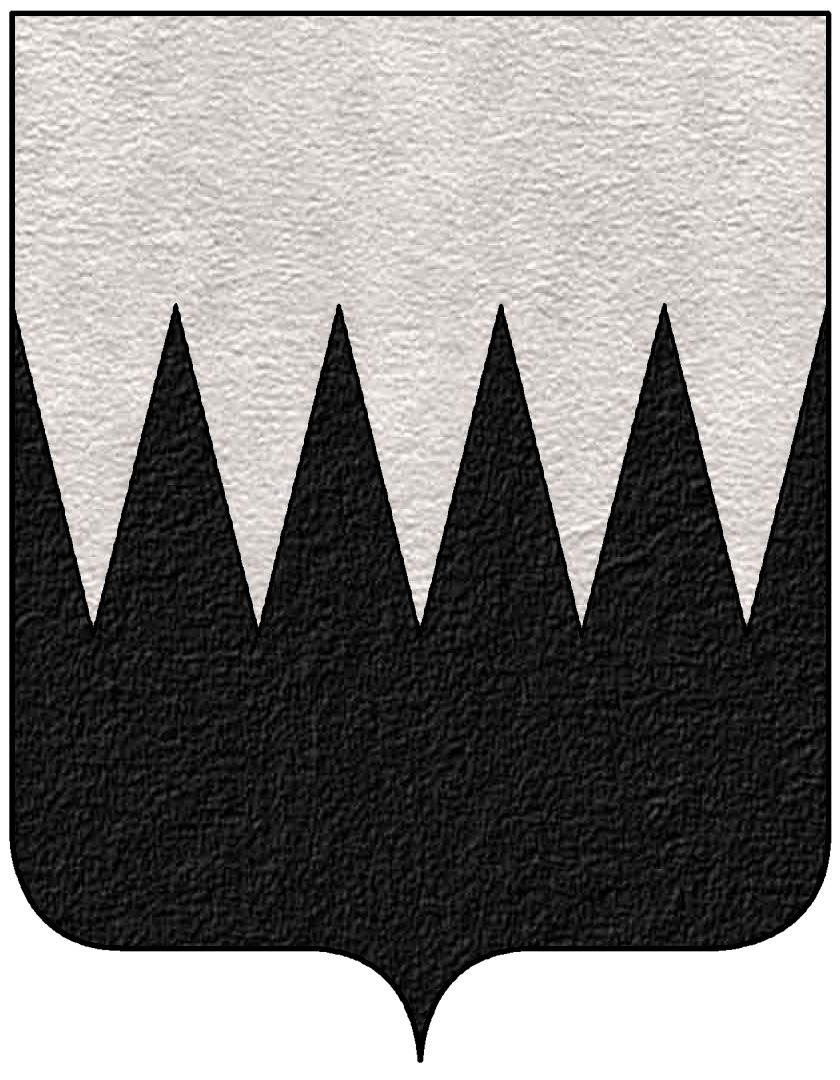
- Coat of arms
- Born: 1610; Messina, Kingdom of Sicily
- Died: 16 June 1678 (aged 67–68); Messina, Kingdom of Sicily
- Noble family: Ruffo di Calabria
- Spouse: Alfonsina Gotho (m. 1641)

Antonio Ruffo (1610 or 1611 – 16 June 1678) was an important Sicilian politician, nobleman, patron and collector from the Ruffo di Calabria family.

== Biography ==
Antonio Ruffo was probably born in Castle Bagnara or Messina. He dedicated most of his life to art, transforming his palazzo into the meeting-place of Messina’s cultural élite. He began collecting paintings in 1646 and, never leaving his native Sicily, acquired all his knowledge of the great Italian and foreign painters from informants and emissaries. He contacted artists directly through letters or agents and sometimes specified the subjects and dimensions of paintings and the sum he wished to spend.

His collections included coins, silverware, paintings by Anthony van Dyck (Saint Rosalie Interceding for the Plague–Stricken of Palermo), Paul Bril, Jacob Jordaens, Abraham Casembroot and others, several Rembrandt etchings and tapestries of The Life of Achilles to designs by Rubens. He and corresponded with Artemisia Gentileschi, Cornelis de Wael and Abraham Brueghel. He particularly admired Rembrandt and commissioned him three paintings (Aristotle with a Bust of Homer, Alexander the Great and Homer Dictating his Verses). He was also the owner of Erminia and the Shepherd (Guercino, 1649), The History of Pythagoras: Buying Fishes and The History of Pythagoras: Coming out of the Cave (Salvator Rosa).

The pictures in his gallery were apparently arranged according to a symmetrical plan; sometimes he commissioned pairs of paintings. Each pair was by one or two artists. Ruffo’s constant concern was to have a collection representative of the work of all the great contemporary painters. Although Ruffo was little influenced by the classicist doctrines that were so strong in Rome in the second half of the 17th century, Guercino, Salvator Rosa and Michelangelo Cerquozzi were also among his favourite painters, as were Jusepe de Ribera, Andrea Vaccaro and Massimo Stanzione. Among the earlier masters, he particularly admired Polidoro da Caravaggio. Religious subjects predominated in his vast collection, but there were also several flower paintings.

Antonio Ruffo died in Messina on 16 June 1678. After the earthquake of 1783, his first-born son Giovanni Ruffo rescued 112 paintings and brought them to Scaletta.

== Collection ==
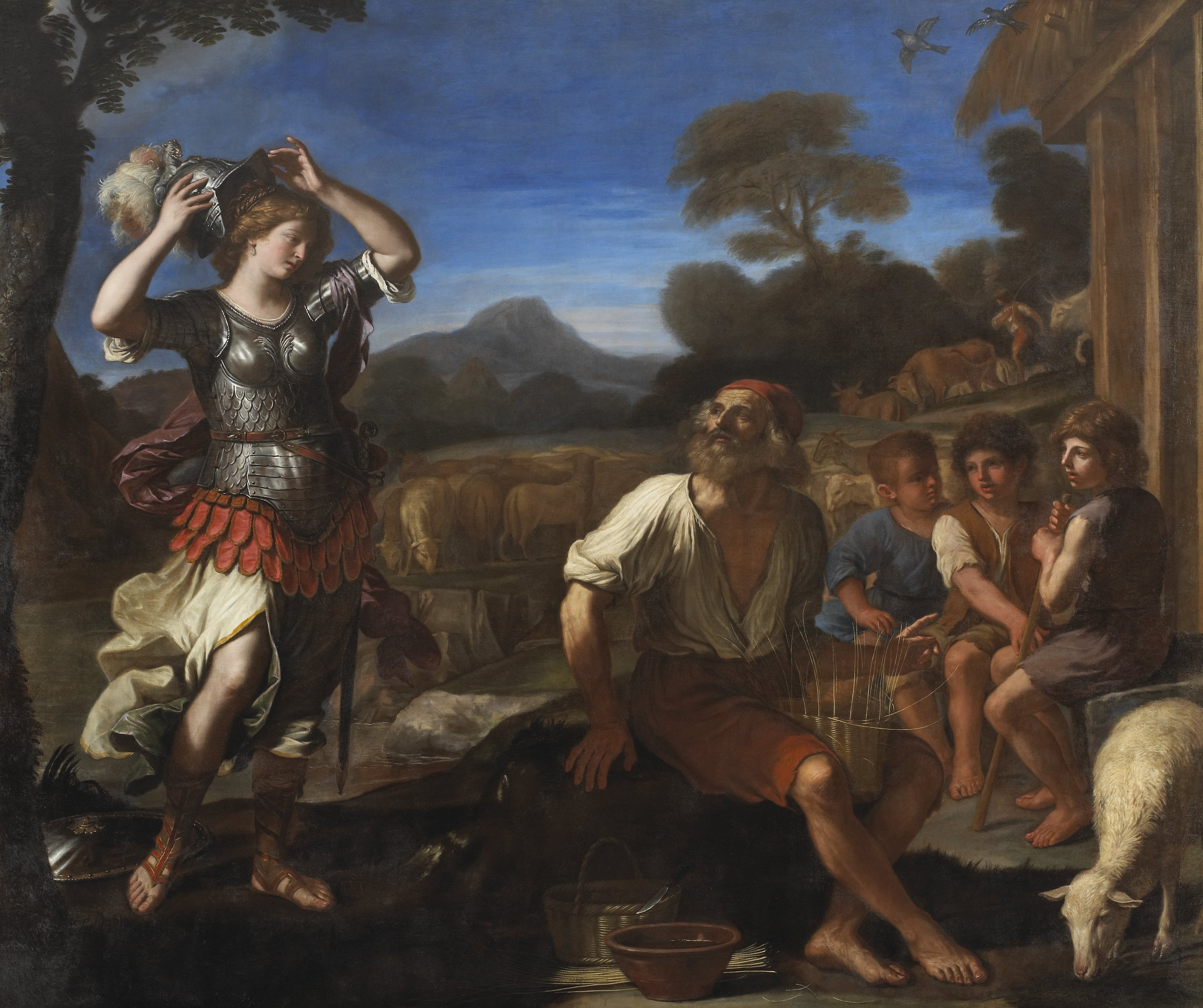
Erminia and the Shepherds by Guercino

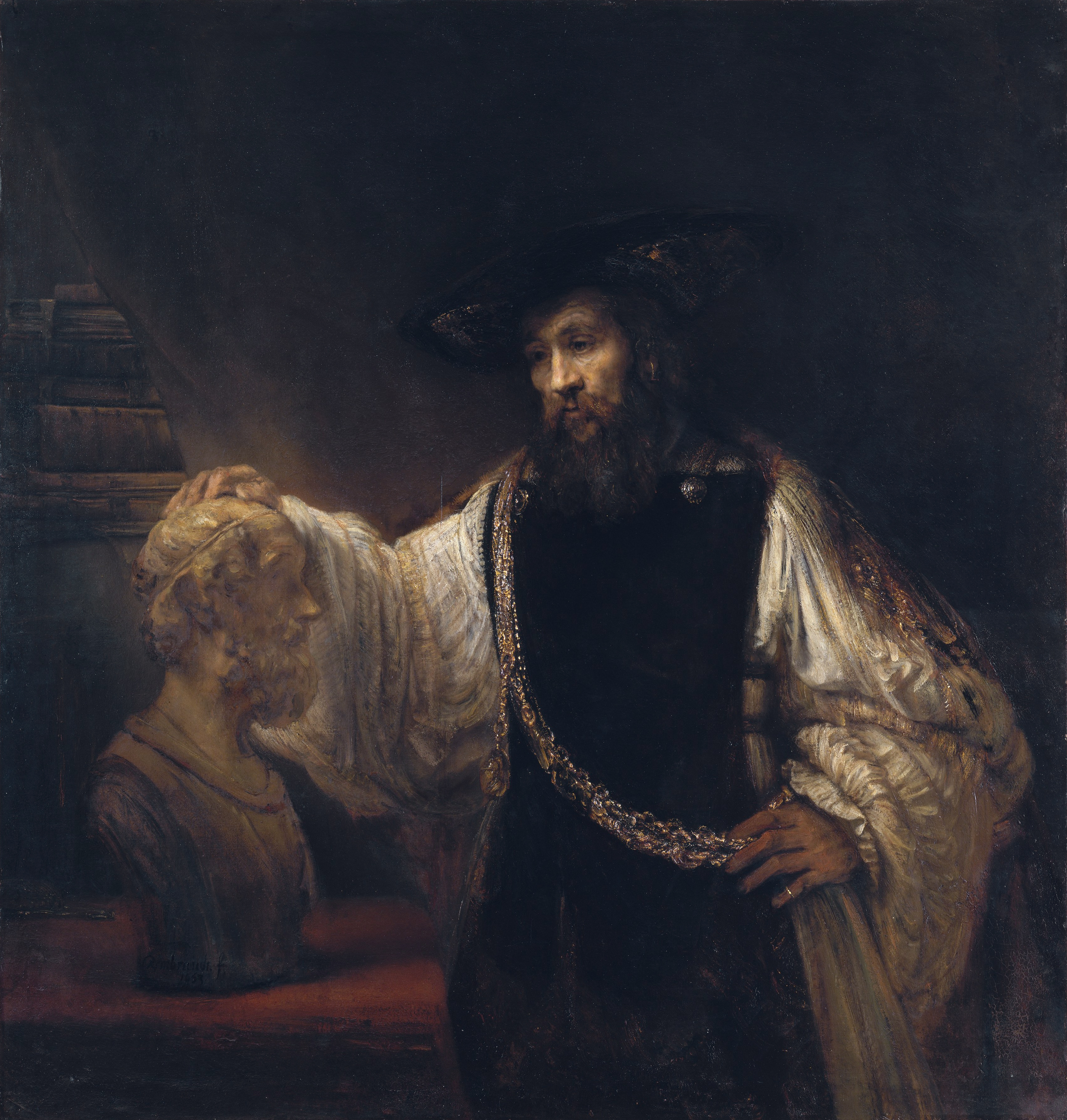
Aristotle with a Bust of Homer by Rembrandt

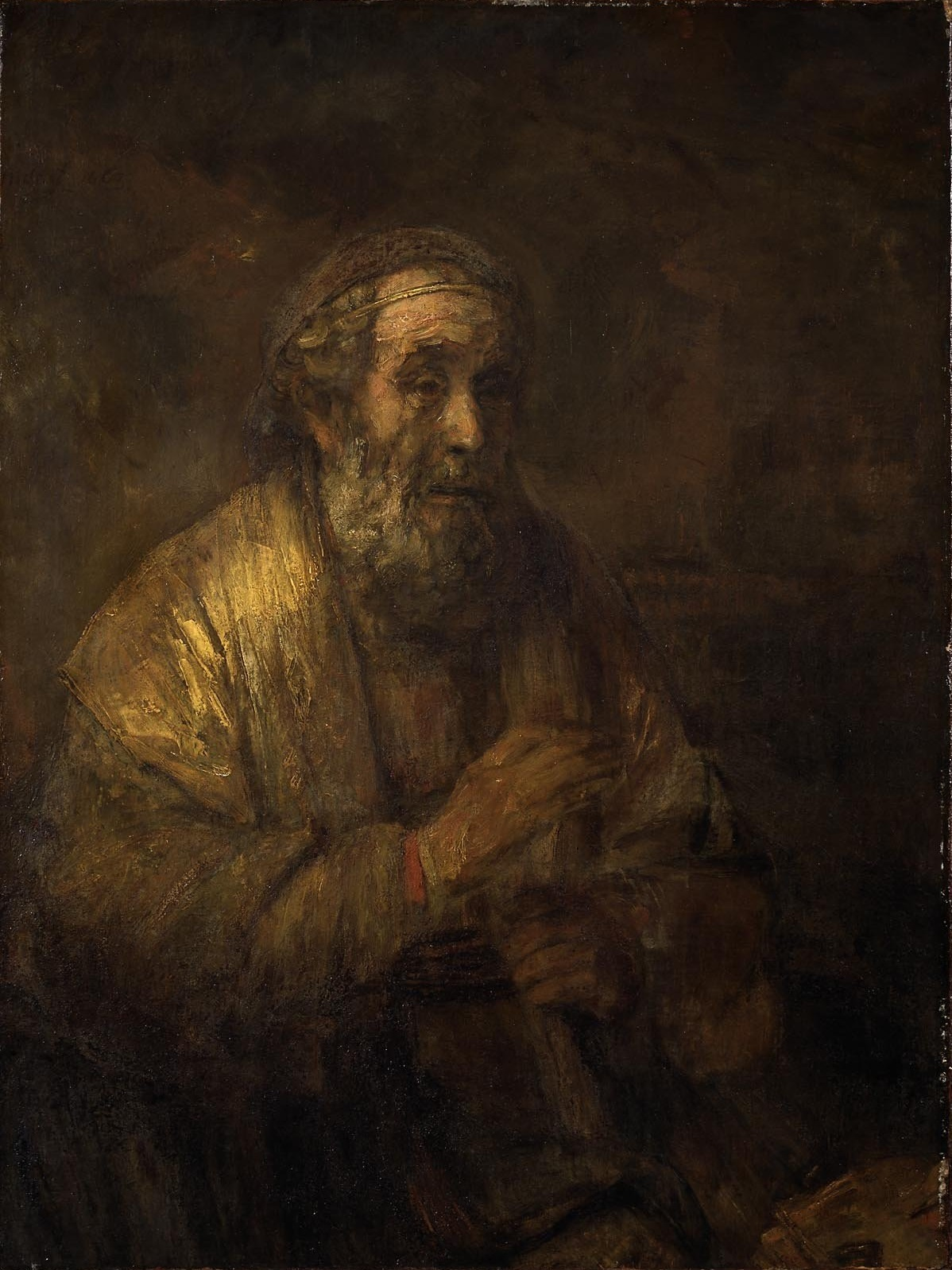
Homer Dictating his Verses by Rembrandt

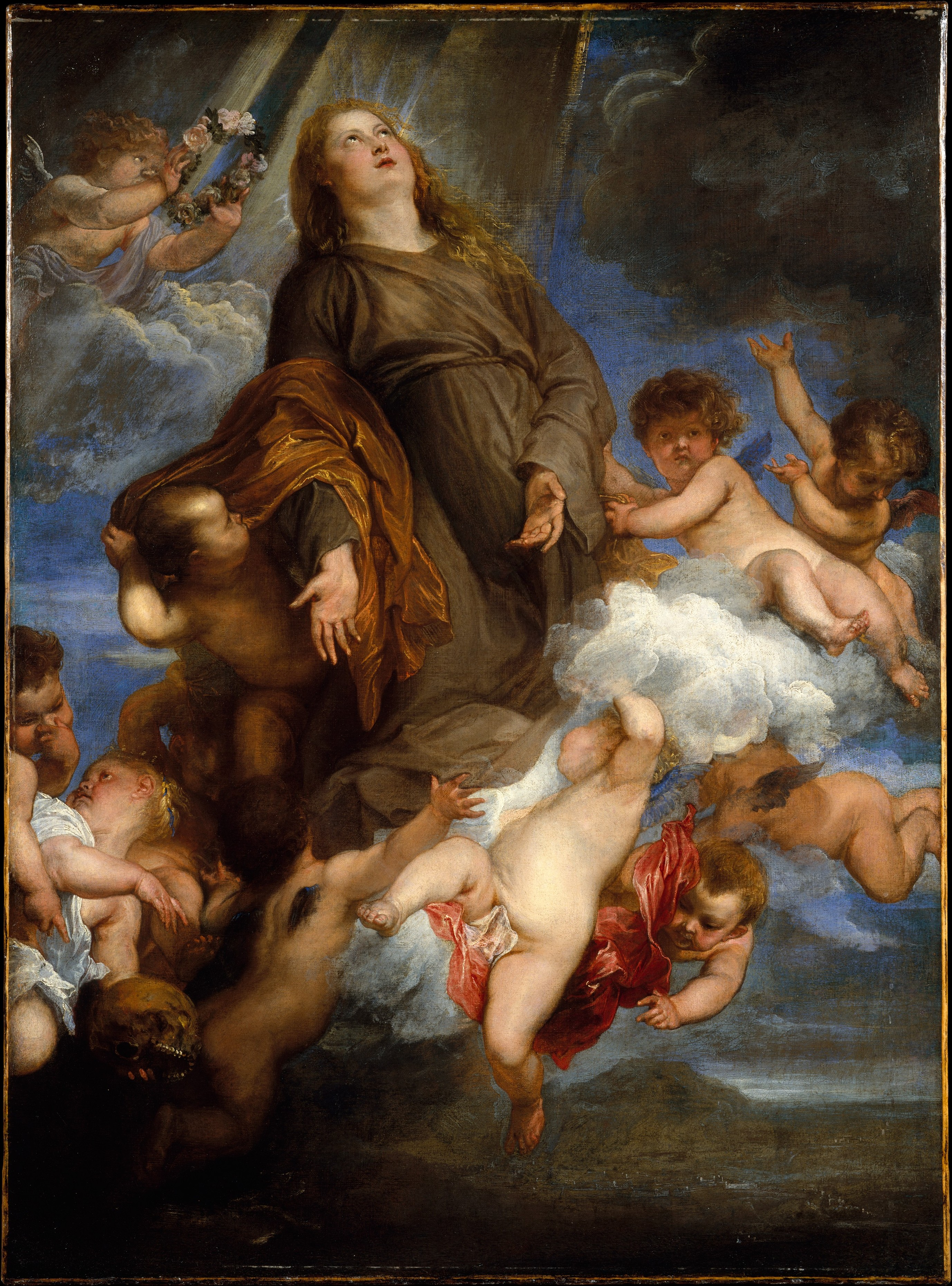
Saint Rosalie Interceding for the Plague-stricken of Palermo by Anthony van Dyck

== Bibliography ==
- Ruffo, Vincenzo (1916). "Galleria Ruffo nel secolo XVII in Messina (con lettere di pittori ed altri documenti inediti)". Bollettino d'Arte (in Italian). 10: 21–64, 95–128, 165–92, 237–56, 284–320, 369–88.
- Ricci, Corrado (1918). Rembrandt in Italia (in Italian). Milan: Alfieri & Lacroix. pp. 7–53.
- Ruffo, Vincenzo (1919). "La Galleria Ruffo (appendice)". Bollettino d'Arte (in Italian). 13: 3–16.
- De Gennaro, Rosanna (1997). "Un inventario ritrovato della collezione di don Antonio Ruffo: precisazioni su Brueghel, Ribera e Savoldo". Prospettiva (in Italian). 87/88 (87/88): 168–174. JSTOR 24432756.
- De Gennaro, Rosanna (2003). Per il collezionismo del Seicento in Sicilia: L'inventario di Antonio Ruffo principe della Scaletta (in Italian). Pisa: Scuola Normale Superiore. ISBN 978-8876421129.
- Primicerio, Alessandra (2021). Antonio Ruffo principe della Scaletta (in Italian). San Giovanni in Fiore: Pubblisfera. ISBN 978-8885576902.
