= Marten Micron =

Marten Micron (1523 – 12 September 1559), also known as Martin Micron, Marten Micronius, and Marten de Klyne , was a Dutch pastor and theologian.

He was born in Ghent and studied theology in Basel and Zürich. Along with Walter Deloenus, he was named by royal charter a pastor of the Dutch Church, Austin Friars in London in 1550. He served until 1553, when he was forced to flee as a result of the Marian persecution. He was then minister of the Dutch Reformed congregation in Norden, Lower Saxony, from 1554 to 1559, when he died from the plague.

Micron wrote several books. In 1554, he published De christlicke ordinancien der Nederlantscher ghemeynten Christi, in which he promoted expository preaching: "the Scriptures are not expounded in sermons on isolated pericopes, as in the practice among the papists. Instead, we take some book of the Bible, either from the Old or the New Testament, and we expound it from the beginning to the end." A Dutch catechism followed in 1555.

Micron had an intensive debate with Menno Simons regarding the incarnation. Menno viewed Christ as possessing a celestial flesh, while Micron believed that Christ took on human flesh and blood from Mary. Menno likened Micron to the locusts of Apollyon.
