= Homer Dictating his Verses =

1663 painting by Rembrandt

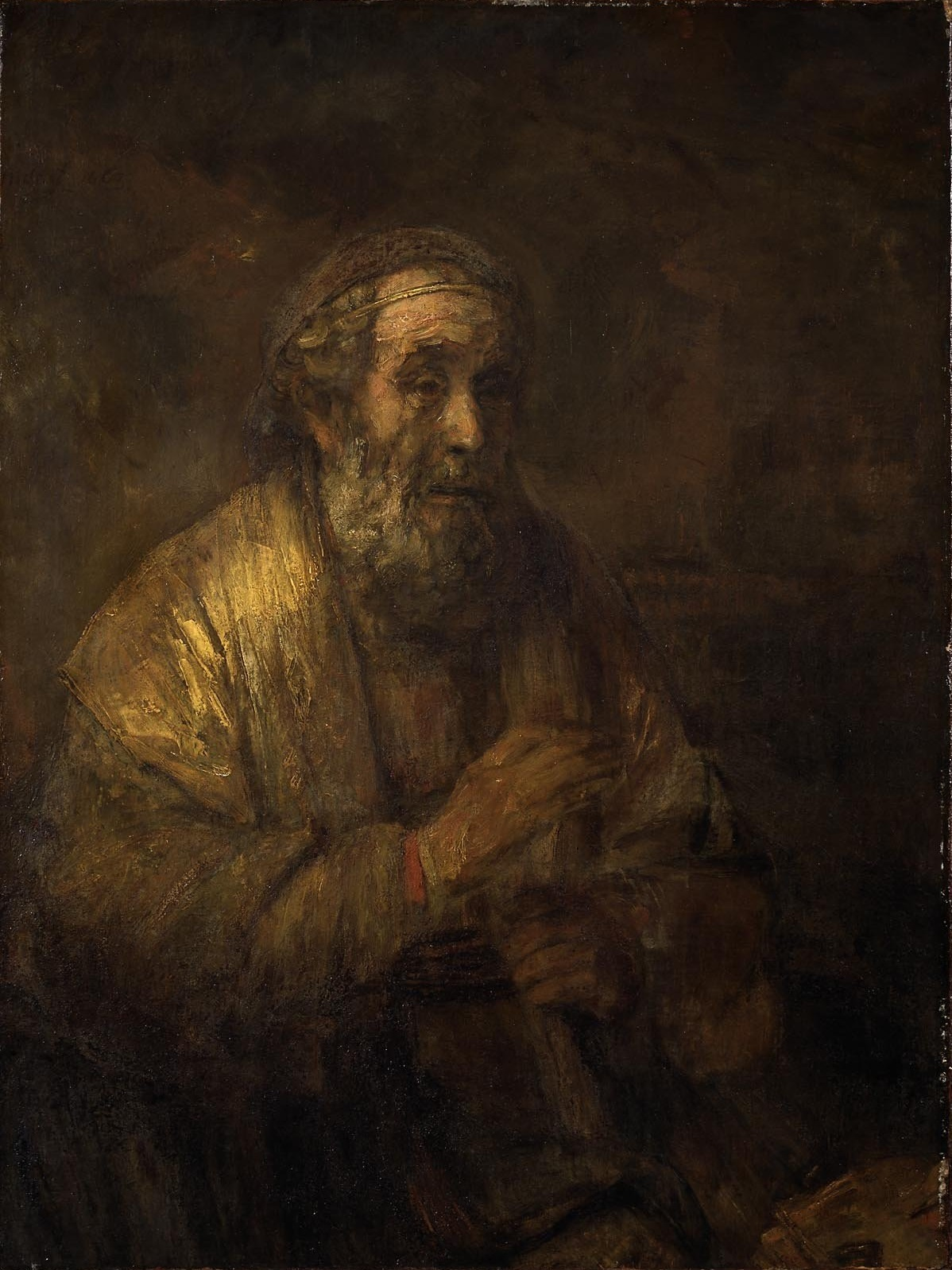
Homer Dictating his Verses

Homer Dictating his Verses is a 1663 oil-on-canvas painting by Rembrandt, signed and dated by the artist. It is now in the Mauritshuis, to which it was bequeathed in 1946 by Abraham Bredius, who had loaned it to the museum since 1894, when he first bought it in London.

With Aristotle with a Bust of Homer (1653) and a lost Alexander the Great (1663), it was one of three works commissioned from the artist by the Sicilian nobleman Antonio Ruffo and remained in his family's collection until around 1750. It is next recorded at a Christie's auction in London on 16 February 1810 as A School Master with His Pupil.

== See also ==
- List of paintings by Rembrandt
