= Aristotle with a Bust of Homer =

1653 painting by Rembrandt

- Aristotle Contemplating a Bust of Homer
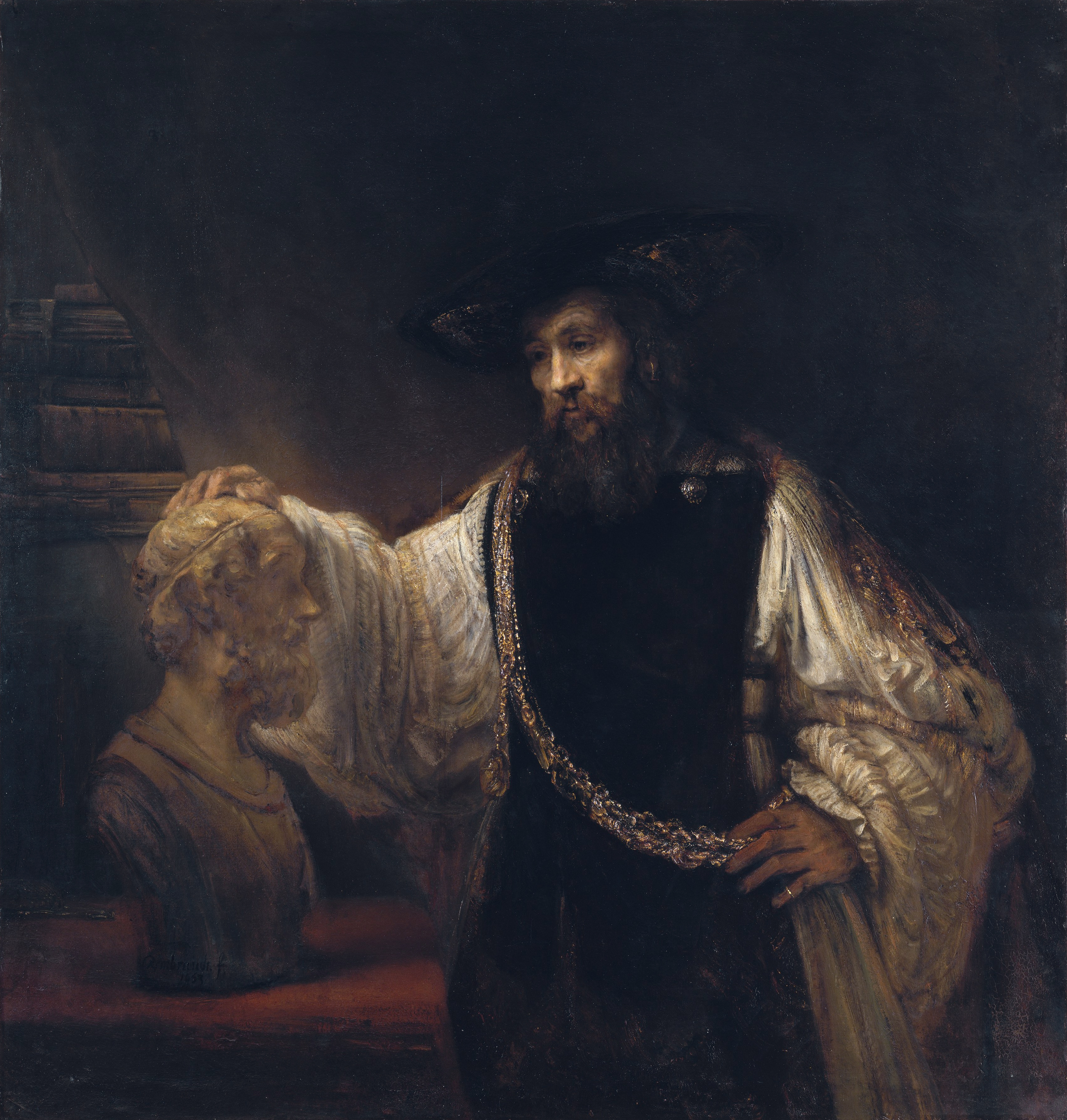
- Artist: Rembrandt
- Year: 1653
- Medium: oil paint, canvas
- Movement: Dutch Golden Age painting, Baroque
- Dimensions: 143.5 cm (56.5 in) × 136.5 cm (53.7 in)
- Location: Metropolitan Museum of Art
- Identifiers: RKDimages ID: 53707; The Met object ID: 437394

Aristotle with a Bust of Homer (Dutch: Aristoteles bij de buste van Homerus), also known as Aristotle Contemplating a Bust of Homer, is an oil-on-canvas painting by Rembrandt that depicts Aristotle wearing a gold chain and contemplating a sculpted bust of Homer. It was created as a commission for Don Antonio Ruffo's collection. It was bought and sold by several collectors until it was eventually purchased by the Metropolitan Museum of Art. The mysterious tone in the painting has led several scholars to different interpretations of Rembrandt's theme.

== Background ==
=== Origins ===
Aristotle Contemplating a Bust of Homer was painted in 1653, as a commission from a Sicilian nobleman named Don Antonio Ruffo, who did not request any particular subject. Despite not knowing what Rembrandt would create, he was already eager to hang it in his Hall of Fame. Don Antonio planned to commission companion pieces for Rembrandt's painting from the Italian painter Guercino. Guercino decided that a cosmographer was the perfect match, since Rembrandt represented the study of mankind while the cosmographer represents the study of the heavens. However, Guercino's piece disappeared for no apparent reason. According to Charles Mee, perhaps Don Antonio did not think it was good enough. Rembrandt later created Homer Dictating his Verses and a lost painting of Alexander the Great for Ruffo, both ten years after completing Aristotle with a Bust of Homer.

=== Subsequent owners ===
In 1815, it was sent to Sir Abraham Hume and he lent it to an exhibition at the British Institution in London. When Hume died, his descendants sold it to Rodolphe Kann in Paris. Kann had a huge collection of notable valuables, but after his death, Rembrandt's painting was sent to other American collectors.

=== Purchase by Metropolitan Museum of Art ===
Eventually, it was purchased in 1961 for $2.3 million by the Metropolitan Museum of Art in New York City, United States. At the time this was the highest amount ever paid for any picture at public or private sale. This inspired the American artist Otis Kaye to critique the sale (and by extension the power of money in art) with his own painting Heart of the Matter, which is held at the Art Institute of Chicago. During the renovation of the Rembrandt wing of the Metropolitan Museum, the painting was re-titled in November 2013 as Aristotle with a Bust of Homer.

=== Misconceptions ===
There has been confusion over the identity of the man in the painting because Don Antonio Ruffo did not specifically request a subject for his commission. It has been thought to be Albertus Magnus, Tasso, Ariosto, Virgil and seventeenth-century Dutch poet Pieter Cornelisz Hooft. The identity of the subject was also challenged by Simon Schama in his book Rembrandt's Eyes. Schama presents a substantial argument that it was the ancient Greek painter Apelles who is depicted in Rembrandt's painting. In 1969, Julius Held argued that it was Aristotle in the painting by analyzing his facial features, his clothes and the objects he holds. According to Held, Aristotle is known for his long hair and beard, fancy jewelry and extravagant dresses, which can be seen in other paintings that featured him between the sixteenth and seventeenth centuries in Europe. Held also connects Aristotle with the bust of Homer and Alexander's chain. Aristotle is known to be a commentator of Homer and Alexander the Great, which led Held to believe that it must be Aristotle in the painting.

== Interpretation ==
=== Theodore Rousseau, 1962 ===
To Theodore Rousseau, there is meaning to how Rembrandt draws Aristotle's eyes. The shadows that partially conceal Aristotle's eyes show that he is lost in his thoughts. The eyes usually hint at a person's inner thoughts, but the use of shadows implies that there is a mystery to what Aristotle is feeling at that moment. Rousseau also mentions Rembrandt's use of various brushstrokes and limited use of colors. These art choices are supposed to imply the different moods he felt while he was painting this piece.

=== Julius Held, 1969 ===
Aristotle, world-weary, looks at the bust of blind, humble Homer, on which he rests one of his hands. This has variously been interpreted as the man of sound methodical science deferring to art, or as the wealthy and famous philosopher, wearing the jeweled belt given to him by Alexander the Great, envying the life of the poor blind bard. It has also been suggested that this is Rembrandt's commentary on the power of portraiture. The interpretation of methodical science deferring to art is discussed at length in Rembrandt's Aristotle and Other Rembrandt Studies. The author notes that Aristotle's right hand (traditionally the favored hand), which rests on the bust of Homer, is both higher and painted in lighter shades than the left hand on the gold chain given to him by Alexander. He also said that the two objects represents his contrasting values: the bust being his persisting values, while the chain is his ever-changing values.

=== Margaret Deutsch Carroll, 1984 ===
Carroll suggested that Aristotle is focusing on the ideas relating to the objects instead of the objects themselves. She uses Rembrandt's other paintings with the same themes of contemplation to support her claim. For example, his St. Paul in Prison shows St. Paul pondering what he will write in his book, not solely on the book itself. For Rembrandt's bust, it represents his "attribute for learning", or his educated past.

=== Saskia Beranek, 2016 ===
Beranek mentions that the gold chain is a token of great honor, since receiving gold is an old practice that recognizes someone's greatest achievement. Beranek believed that the appeal of the painting is how it engages the viewers. As the audience watches Aristotle as he is deep in thought, they can contemplate along with him.

=== Nicola Suthor, 2018 ===
There are stacked books in the background painted in a realistic manner, which gives them importance to the scene. According to Suthor, they represent the lingering reminder of a great poet. Aristotle's hand has a warm color when it touches the bust of Homer, which implies a special bond Aristotle feels with Homer. While the bust of Homer seems more visible than Alexander's chain, Rembrandt makes the chain seem as if it were protruding from the frame, thus giving it as much prominence as the bust.

== In other media ==
The painting forms the central theme of Joseph Heller's 1988 novel Picture This. It explores Rembrandt's insight on society as he contemplates the value of money.

== See also ==
- List of paintings by Rembrandt
