= Abraham Casembroot =

Dutch painter

Abraham Casembroot (before 1593 in Bruges? – 1658 in Messina), was a painter from the Low Countries, active in Sicily.

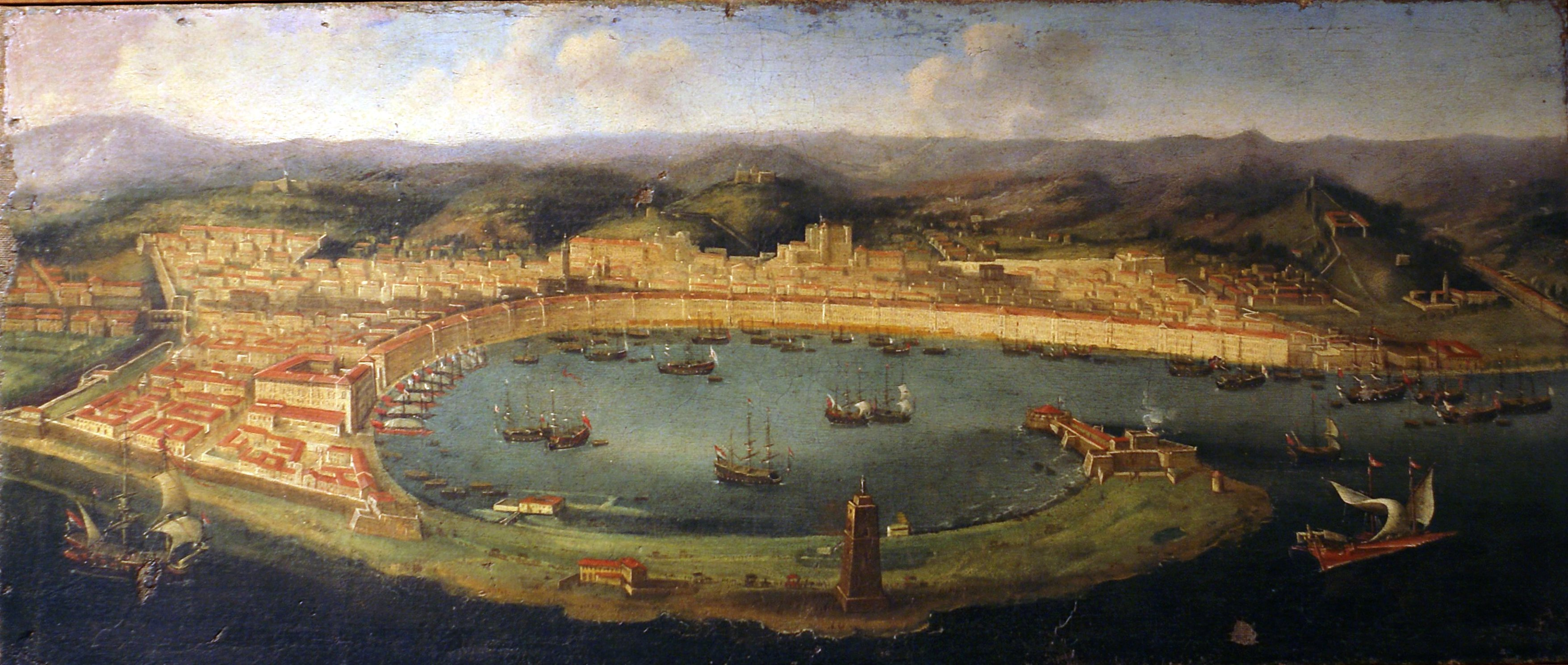
Abraham Casembroot's View of Messina Harbor with the Palazzata, designed by Simone Gullì in 1623

== Life ==
Casembroot lived in Sicily from 1623. He worked at Messina, painting landscapes and marine subjects, generally showing storms in the latter. He also occasionally painted historical events, and three small pictures on copper by him of scenes from the Passion are recorded as having been in the church of San Gioacchino at Messina (destroyed by the catastrophic earthquake in 1908).

He produced a few etchings of the port of Messina and other marine subjects and Cornelis Bol made a series of etchings after five of his harbour scenes; four are of Italian subjects, but one shows Lambeth Palace in London.

From 1649 until his death in 1658 Casembroot was consul of the Dutch Republic in Sicily.
