= Steven Mierdman =

Dutch printer

Steven Mierdman (c.1510–1559) was among the most important Dutch printers of Reformation books.

Mierdman, also known as Stephen Mierdman, Steven Mierdmans, Stephen Myerdmann, and Steven Mierman, was born in Hooge Mierde. He first printed in Antwerp from 1542 to about 1546, becoming a freeman of the city in November 1543. Some time after 1546, to escape proceedings for having printed heretical books, he went to England. In July 1550, Mierdman, who had already taken out letters of denization, was granted a royal licence for five years "to print various books hitherto unprinted" and to "employ printers, English and foreign." While printing in London from 1549 to 1553, he printed a number of books in Latin, English, French, Italian and Dutch, the majority being Protestant tracts, many of them by members of the Dutch Reformed Church.

On the accession of Queen Mary, Mierdman had to uproot himself once again. He settled in Emden, printing there from 1554 to 1558. In Emden he met Willem Gailliart, who would take over his printing shop after Mierdman's death, at Emden in 1559.

The number of books which bear Mierdman's imprint on the title page or colophon are but a small part of his extremely large output; he worked for a number of stationers and printed many books bearing fictitious imprints, such as "Niclaes van Oldenborch."
