= Austin Friars, London =

Former friary in the City of London

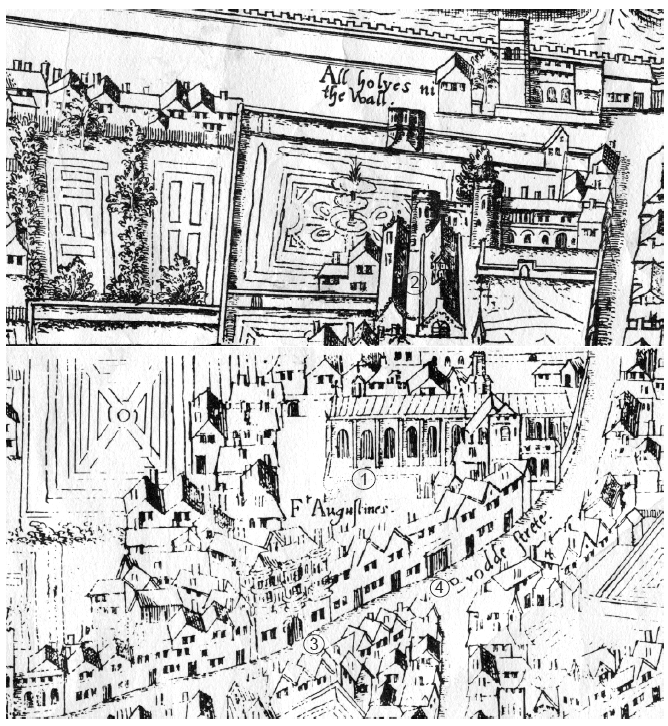
- Plan of Austin Friars, 1550s
- Interactive map of Austin Friars, London

Monastery information
- Order: Augustinian
- Established: 1260s?
- Disestablished: November 1538
- Dedication: St Augustine
- Diocese: London

People
- Founder: Humphrey de Bohun, 2nd Earl of Hereford

Site
- Location: City of London, England
- Coordinates: 51.51557°N 0.085579°W
- Grid reference: TQ 32912 81334
- Visible remains: Dutch Church, Austin Friars
- Public access: Yes (Dutch Church only)

Austin Friars, London was an Augustinian friary in the City of London from its foundation, probably in the 1260s, until its dissolution in November 1538. It covered an area of about 5.5 acres (2.2 hectares) a short distance to the north-east of the modern Bank of England and had a resident population of about 60 friars. A church stood at the centre of the friary precinct, with a complex of buildings behind it providing accommodation, refreshment and study space for the friars and visiting students. A large part of the friary precinct was occupied by gardens that provided vegetables, fruit and medicinal herbs.

In addition, some of the precinct and land immediately adjoining it was used to build rented tenements which were occupied by a number of notable figures including Erasmus, the Imperial ambassador Eustace Chapuys, and Thomas Cromwell, the principal official of King Henry VIII. As Cromwell's fortunes rose, he obtained more of the friary's land to build one of the largest private mansions in London. However, his house was seized by the Crown following his fall from power and execution in July 1540. It was sold off along with the friary precinct, much of which was subsequently demolished. The mansion became the Drapers' Hall, while the nave of the friary church became the Dutch Church at Austin Friars.

== Establishment and history ==
Members of the Augustinian Order first arrived in England around 1249. The Augustinian Friary in London (customarily abbreviated as Austin Friars) was founded in the 1260s. According to John Stow, the friary was established by Humphrey de Bohun, 2nd Earl of Hereford and Essex and Constable of England, on his return from the Seventh Crusade. (Stow gives a date of 1253, but this appears to be too early, as the first verifiable reference to the friary dates only to around 1270; sources from the 1250s omit any reference to the Austin Friars.) It was built on Broad Street in the north of the City of London, on land acquired from (probably) two older churches. St Olave Broad Street appears to have been demolished to make way for the friary, as later records show that the friars subsequently paid annual compensation to St Paul's Cathedral for the "land and appurtenances where the parish church of St Olave Broad Street ... used to be". The church of St Peter le Poer or St Peter the Poor (also known as St Peter Broad Street) was incorporated into the friary, forming the south aisle of the friary church's choir.

By the second half of the 14th century a series of land acquisitions had enabled the friary to expand to cover 5.5 acres (2.2 hectares). It had about 60 friars by the end of the 13th century and through the 14th century, though the number fluctuated over time and declined in the 15th century. Most of the friars whose names are known appear to have been English, predominantly from East Anglia and the London region. Not unusually for friaries within the City of London, Austin Friars was favoured by the aristocracy and by other wealthy people both as a place of worship and as a final resting place. The friary made a good profit from these associations; the friary church was completely rebuilt on a grander scale than the original in 1354, and there was no difficulty in funding a new steeple to replace the one demolished by a storm in 1362. By the 16th century it was receiving a rental income of £60 annually and enjoyed a healthy income from bequests.

The friary played an important role as a centre for religious education. It housed a studium generale attended by students who aspired to go on to study at Oxford, Cambridge or one of the major continental European universities. It incorporated a school and a library which were attended not only by English people but by foreigners resident in London, notably the Italians and Germans. It was not uncommon for foreign friars to come to study at Austin Friars and then stay on, to preach and hear confessions for their countrymen in London. For some, the disruption caused by the Great Schism probably made the friary a more attractive place to study than continental institutions. The state did not make much use of the friary, unlike some of the others in London, though the Commissary Court did occasionally sit there.

During the Peasants' Revolt of 1381, thirteen Flemings who had been sheltering in the friary were taken out and lynched by the mob, though the friars themselves appear to have been left unharmed. Five years later, a sermon to Lollards in the nearby church of St Christopher le Stocks (since demolished) about the practices and privileges of Augustinian monks almost led to the razing of the friary by that congregation. Only the timely intercession of the local sheriff led the mob to disperse.

Many notable people were buried within the friary precinct including its founder, Humphrey de Bohun. Other interments included Hubert de Burgh; Edward, the young son of Edward, the Black Prince; Richard FitzAlan, 10th Earl of Arundel and Surrey; John de Vere, 12th Earl of Oxford and his son Aubrey; Edward Stafford, 3rd Duke of Buckingham; and many of the high-ranking knights killed at the Battle of Barnet in April 1471, also Maurice Berkeley, 3rd Baron Berkeley (d.1506) and his wife. Perkin Warbeck, pretender to the English throne, was buried in Austin Friars in 1499 after his execution at Tyburn.

== Buildings ==
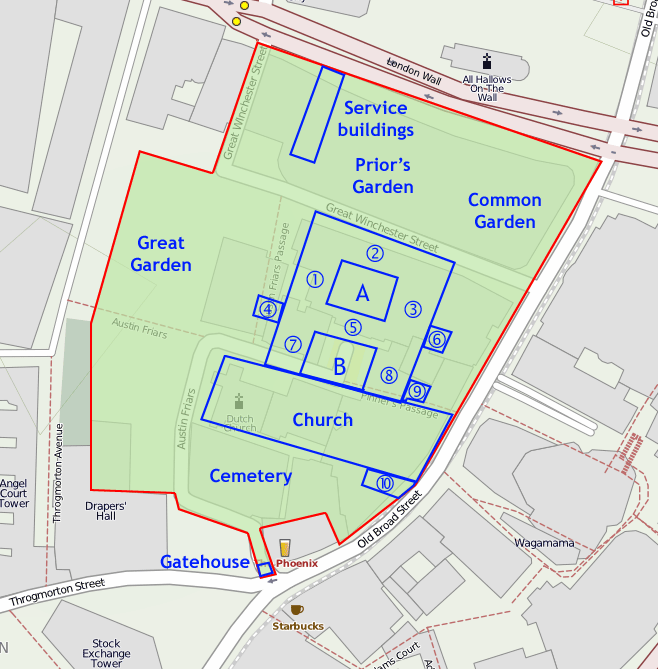
Plan of Austin Friars, London overlaid on a modern street map. A. North Cloister B. Principal Cloister 1. Library 2. Infirmary 3. Kitchen 4. Porter's Lodge 5. Refectory 6. Main Chapter House 7. Guest hall and dormitory 8. Dormitory 9. Prior's House 10. Church of St Peter the Poor

The friary was constructed over time, as the availability of money and land permitted. The church's nave and the other friary buildings may not have been completed until after 1350. Like other urban friaries, it was surrounded by a high wall to provide a measure of privacy. This ran on three sides along Broad Street, London Wall and part of Throgmorton Street and was made variously of stone or brick. The friary precinct was entered via at least three gates, the main one of which was located on Throgmorton Street and gave access to the church and churchyard.

The friary church stood at the centre of the complex. The Crown gave the friary six oaks from Windsor Forest in 1277, possibly to provide wood for the roof, while bequests in the 14th century (including one by a descendant of the friary's founder) show that construction continued into the 1370s. The nave of the church survived until it was destroyed in The Blitz of 1940 and it was surveyed by the Royal Commission on Historic Monuments before the war, so a good deal is known about its original appearance and dimensions.

It was built using Kentish Ragstone with external flint courses and mouldings made from Reigate Stone. The church's plan incorporated a three-aisled nave, floored in Purbeck marble, and a two-aisled choir. The nave measured 149 ft by 83 ft internally (45.3 m by 25.2 m) and was accessed principally through a main door on its western front. The altar, which was probably dedicated to St Augustine himself, stood at the far end on the eastern side, in front of a wooden screen. The church's choir had two aisles and six bays, measuring about 96 by 57 ft (29 by 17 m) The medieval part of the church of St Peter le Poer was incorporated into the friary church to form its south aisle. This would have been discontinuous from the rest of the choir and was probably separated from it in some fashion, perhaps by a stone wall or a masonry arcade and timber screen. The old church would have been entered from Broad Street rather than through the precinct of the friary. There were also several chapels, the existence of which is recorded in wills and records of herald's visitations; these were dedicated to St Thomas, John the Baptist, St Catherine and the Virgin Mary.

A cemetery was located to the south of the church, behind a row of rented tenements that fronted Throgmorton Street. Little is known about it, and an archaeological excavation in 1910 failed to find the expected graves. A preaching pulpit and cross were situated to the west of the churchyard.

The cloisters have twice been excavated, once in 1909 and again in the 1980s. The priory had two, the one to the south being the principal cloister. 16th century records enable the buildings surrounding the cloister to be identified. The principal cloister had both a main and a secondary chapter house and was flanked by dormitories for guests and residents. Just to the west of the guest hall was a porter's lodge, controlling access to the complex, while a refectory divided the north and south cloisters. The north cloister was flanked by a library on the west side, an infirmary on the north side and kitchens on the east side. The prior's house adjoined the east side of the south cloister and may have had its own private entrance to the friary church.

There were certainly a number of other monastic buildings within the friary precinct but little is known about them. There would, for instance, have been a number of service buildings to facilitate the friary's maintenance. The studium generale would have had its own building, and the building of a domus lectorum (house for the student lectors) was authorised in 1419. The friary is the only one in London known to have had its own prison. It was at the centre of a scandal in 1525 when an imprisoned friar died there, leading to those responsible being imprisoned for a while in the Tower of London. The friary also had extensive gardens, principally in the northern end of its precinct. The largest was the Great Garden, on the western side, which was some 388 ft (118 m) long by the 16th century. They would have been used to grow vegetables and medicinal herbs, and a 16th-century lease indicates that one of the gardens had fruit trees as well.

=== Thomas Cromwell's house and other tenements ===
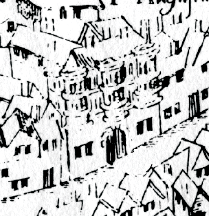
Thomas Cromwell’s house at Austin Friars, as depicted on the 1550s "Copperplate Map" of London

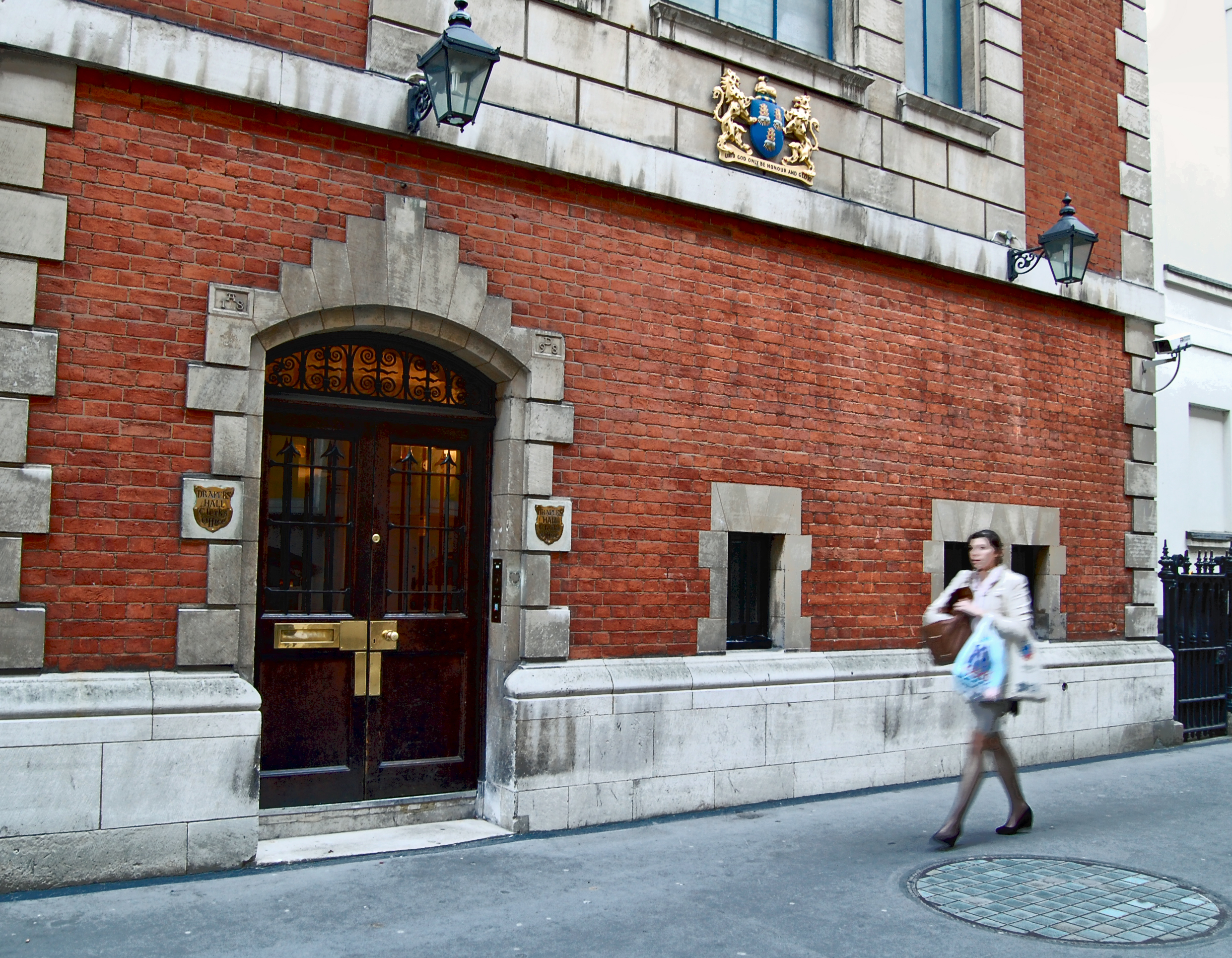
Administration entrance to Drapers' Hall, pictured in 2012. The site of Thomas Cromwell's House

Monastic houses in London often leased land within their precincts to secular tenants, and Austin Friars was no exception. Several tenements were built on the western side of the precinct and the friary also owned a number of properties just outside the precinct, adjoining Throgmorton Street, which included the Swanne and Bell inns. The larger tenements were rented to important officials and dignitaries; in the first half of the 16th century their tenants included Thomas Cromwell, the wealthy Italian merchant John Cavalcante, the Holy Roman Emperor's ambassador Eustace Chapuys, the French ambassador, and Erasmus, who left without paying his bill. These properties enabled the friary to obtain about £60 a year in rents, although the disposal of a number of properties in the 1530s reduced this figure to £40 annually by 1538.

Cromwell's property was arguably the most significant, as it played an important role both in his own downfall and in the wider fate of the friary. The first house he occupied there lay to the west of the churchyard and immediately north of Cavalcante's tenement and warehouse. It was a substantial property, with fourteen rooms arranged in three three-storey wings with an attached garden. It is not clear when he moved in, but his wife was certainly living there by 1525 and there are indications that he may have been living in the area as early as 1522.

By 1532, Cromwell had become one of the key figures in the court of Henry VIII and needed a house that was more appropriate to his elevated position. He expanded his holdings at Austin Friars, purchasing several surrounding properties outright at a cost of £550 – a very considerable sum for the time. He ended up with one of the largest private properties in London, covering 2 acres (0.81 hectares) including a 1.25 acres (0.51 hectares) "greater garden". From July 1535 through to 1539, Cromwell spent over £1,000 building one of the greatest private houses in London, employing at least 98 workers to carry out the project. The architect is recorded only as "Sir John" (without a surname) but it is possible that this was the Italian military engineer John (Giovanni) Portinari, who was working for Cromwell at the time. The house was intended to serve several purposes: a domestic residence for Cromwell and his family, an administrative base and an urban palace where he could entertain important guests, potentially even the King himself.

The layout of the house is known in detail as it was surveyed in the 1640s or 1650s by the Drapers' Company, which acquired the property after Cromwell's downfall. It had two main storeys, with the street frontage possessing a third storey and garrets. It was mostly built in brick with walls up to two feet thick. The "copperplate" map of London, made in the 1550s, shows the imposing frontage of the house with three oriel windows above a large gateway. The building had over fifty rooms arranged around three courtyards, entered via the main gateway. Several halls existed on the first floor, including one overlooking the street via the oriel windows, which would have been decorated with high-quality Flemish tapestries. The Cromwell family lived on the first floor with the servants in second floor rooms and garrets. Kitchens and service rooms were situated on the ground floor and the house also had its own chapel. It is not clear how much of the garden had been completed while Cromwell lived at Austin Friars, but it is known that he planned to have a stables, a tennis court and a bowling alley constructed there.

Cromwell's fall from power in June 1540 led to his mansion being transferred to the royal household. He was executed the following month. For the next three years the house remained under royal control before being sold to the Drapers' Company. Part of it was used as the new company hall while the wings and adjoining tenements were rented to the Company's wardens and master. The garden continued to be used by Company members until the 20th century, with non-members able to use it for an annual fee.

== Burials ==
- Humphrey de Bohun, 6th Earl of Hereford
- Sir Philip le Despenser
- Edward of Angoulême
- Richard Fitzalan, 4th Earl of Arundel
- Lucia Visconti
- Sir John Tyrrell
- Sir James Tyrrell
- Sir Thomas Cooke
- William de Berkeley, 1st Marquess of Berkeley
- Perkin Warbeck
- Maurice Berkeley, 3rd Baron Berkeley
- Edward Stafford, 3rd Duke of Buckingham

== Reformation and dissolution ==
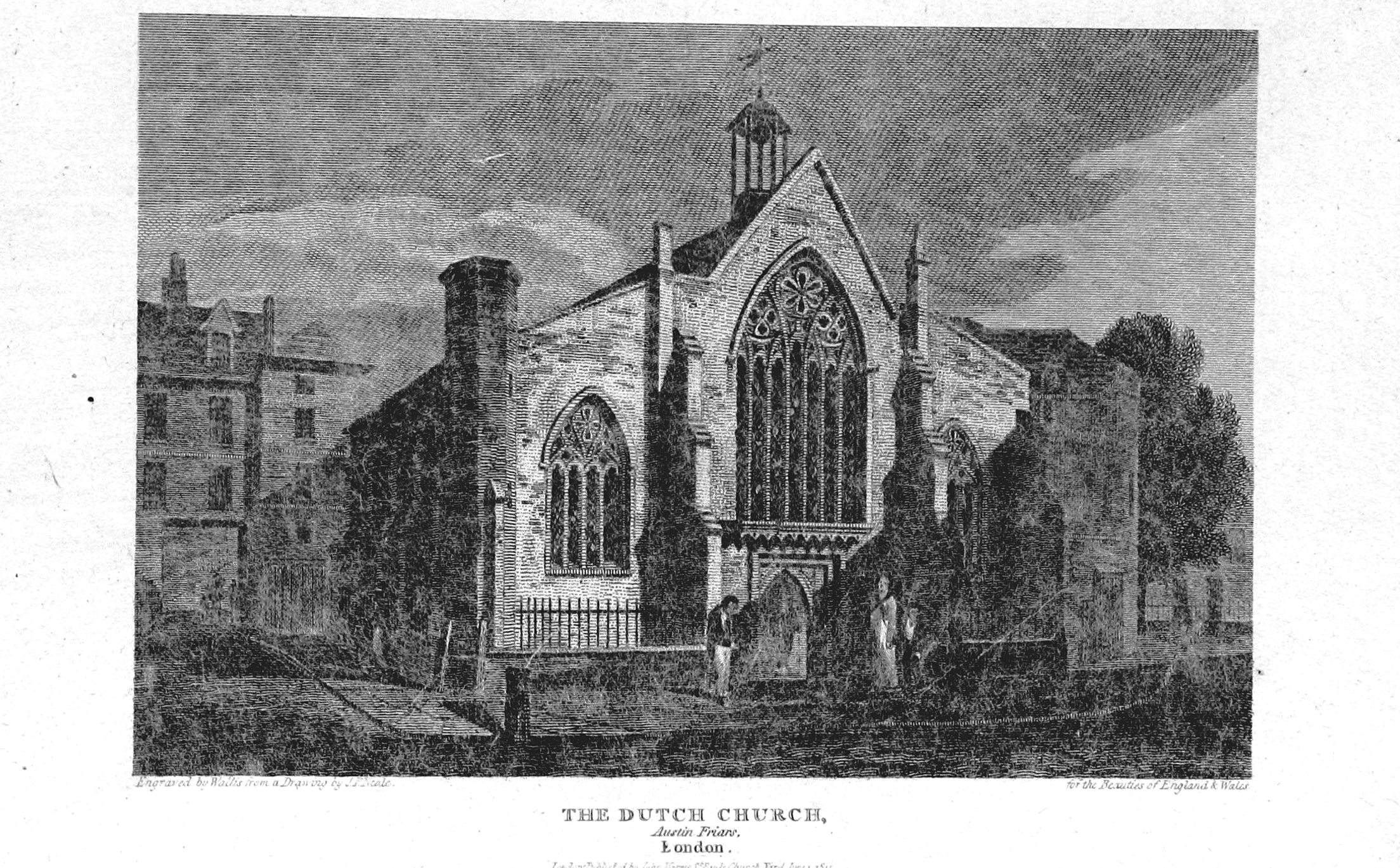
The Dutch Church (1820) by Edward Wedlake Brayley from A Topographical and Historical Description of London and Middlesex

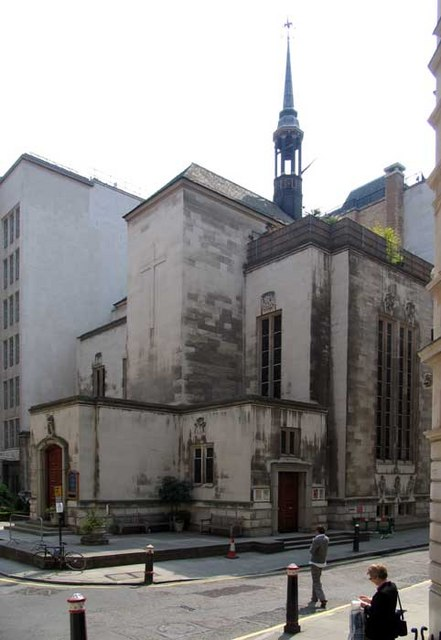
The Dutch Church – the last remaining fragment of Austin Friars

The later history of the friary is inextricably linked with the English Reformation. In 1526, the Cantabrigian scholar and Augustinian friar Doctor Robert Barnes was punished for heresy at Old St Paul's Cathedral. Dr Barnes was the Prior of Austin Friars, Cambridge, and was sent to Austin Friars in London after his penance had been done at the cathedral and in the notorious Fleet Prison. His time at Austin Friars, though supposedly undertaken as a form of house arrest, was free and unmolested – he was able to meet whom he liked, and to buy and sell copies of the English New Testament, a work banned at the time as heretical.

Thomas Cromwell was a leading supporter of the English Reformation, indeed one of its principal masterminds, and found his neighbour the Prior to be sympathetic to his cause. The Prior, George Brown, preached sermons in support of the King's unpopular divorce from Catherine of Aragon and subsequent marriage to Anne Boleyn. Brown was later rewarded by Cromwell with work as a commissioner, whose job it was to visit all the monastic houses in the kingdom to assess them for piety and wealth before the dissolution.

Part of Cromwell's drive to dissolve the monasteries is explained by his low opinion of monks and friars. With the exception of the Prior, he will have found his neighbours to have been exemplars of exactly the kind of behaviour that made reform justified and necessary: anonymous disaffected members of the friary reported in 1534 on the neglect of services, drinking of alcohol, dining alone and the lack of any adherence to monastic rules. Ironically all behaviour the prior of the house was responsible for allowing to continue.

The friary was dissolved in November 1538 on the orders of Cromwell and yielded an income of £57 0s 4d to the Crown. Sir William Paulet, 1st Marquess of Winchester acquired the monastic buildings and built a town house on the site. It survived until 1844, when it was turned into warehouses. The City of London attempted to buy the friary church from the Crown in 1539 and again in 1546 but was rebuffed on both occasions. In July 1550, London's community of "Germans and other strangers" was granted the use of the friary church's nave to serve as the "Temple of the Lord Jesus". After briefly serving as a Catholic chapel for Italians, it became the first official nonconformist chapel in England under its Polish-born minister Jan Łaski. His congregation was based in Frisia, which is now divided between Germany and the Netherlands; this connection gave the church its modern name of the Dutch Church and the Dutch language is still used there for services. The rest of the church was turned into a storehouse for corn, coal and wine, with the monuments sold for £100 and the lead stripped from the roof. The choir, tower and transepts were demolished in 1600 and in 1862 a fire destroyed the rest of the church. The reconstructed building was destroyed in the Blitz during the Second World War and was rebuilt again between 1950 and 1956.

== Today ==
Today the site is divided by a road named Austin Friars. The site is mainly occupied by office blocks. However, the Draper's Hall and the Dutch Church still stand here, separated by the road, although both buildings are replacements for earlier buildings (and for the one destroyed in the Blitz, in the case of the Dutch Church).

== In literature ==
Hilary Mantel's novels Wolf Hall, Bring Up the Bodies and The Mirror & the Light create a fictional account of the career of Thomas Cromwell. Many scenes are set at his home in Austin Friars.

The early Quaker tractarian and proto-feminist Sarah Blackborow lived in Austin's parish in the City of London.

In chapter 29 of Charles Dickens's novel Martin Chuzzlewit, Tom Pinch is summoned to see Mr Fips in Austin Friars to be offered a position.

== See also ==
- Tyndale Bible
- Thomas Cranmer
- Valor Ecclesiasticus

== Bibliography ==
- Dickens, A. G. (1989). The English Reformation (2 ed.). London: B. T. Batsford.
- Holder, Nick (2017). The Friaries of Medieval London: From Foundation to Dissolution (Woodbridge: Boydell); chapter 6, pages 119-41.
- Holder, Nick (2011). "The Medieval Friaries of London (PhD thesis)" (PDF). University of London.
- Page, William (1909). A History of the County of London: Volume 1: London within the Bars, Westminster and Southwark. London: Victoria County History.
- Pollard, Alfred W. (1974). Records of the English Bible. Kent: Wm. Dawson & Sons Ltd.
- Röhrkasten, Jens (2004). The Mendicant Houses of Medieval London, 1221–1539. LIT Verlag Münster. p. 296. ISBN 9783825881177.
- Weinreb, Ben; Hibbert, Christopher (1993). The London Encyclopedia. London: Macmillan. ISBN 9780333576885.
