= Vaux Passional =

Illuminated manuscript

The Vaux Passional
- National Library of Wales, Aberystwyth
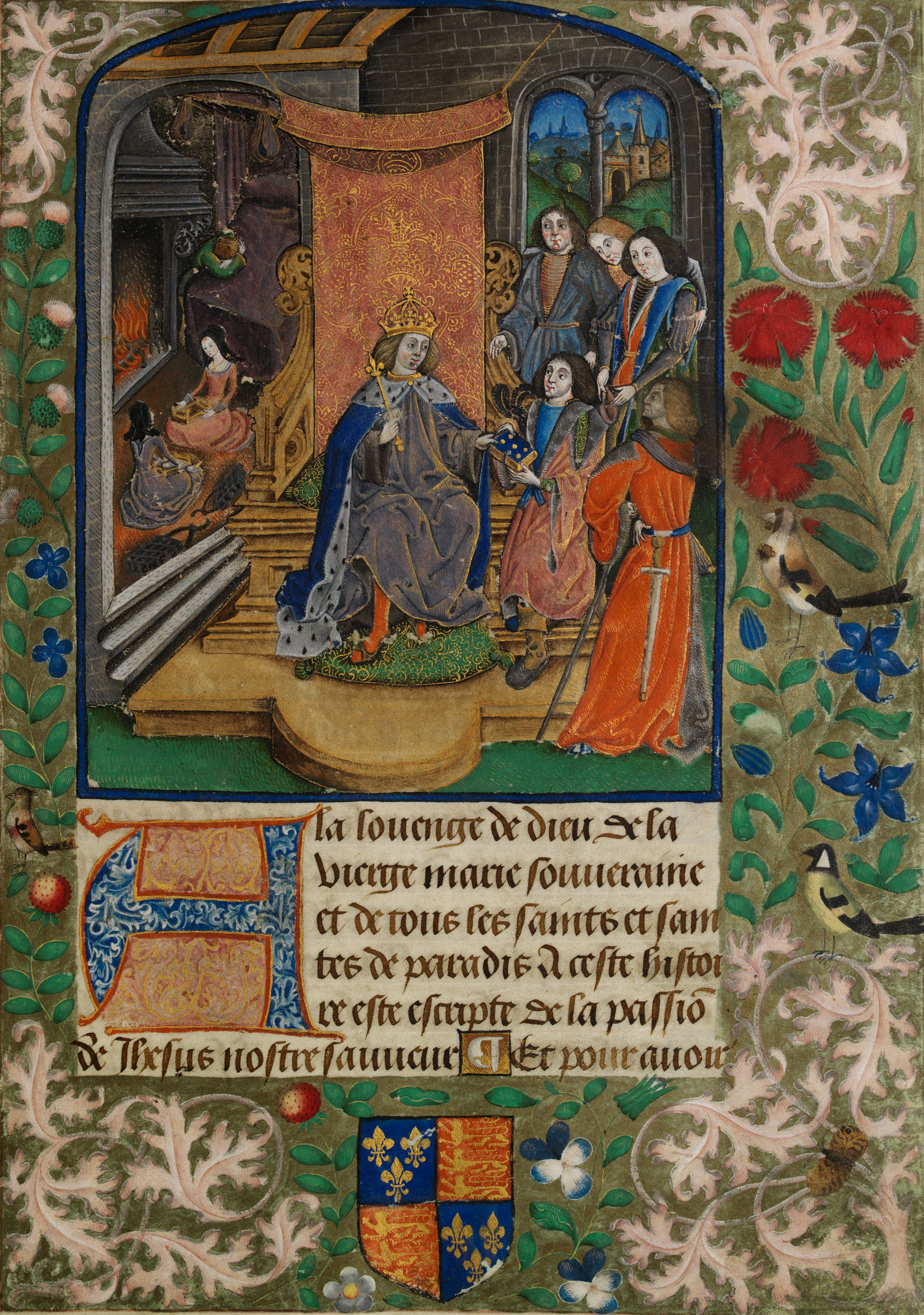
- Presentation page (f. 9) from the Vaux Passional showing Henry VII in mourning with his children Margaret, Mary and Henry on the upper left
- Also known as: Peniarth Ms. 482D
- Date: c. 1503–04

The Vaux Passional (Peniarth 482D) is an illuminated manuscript from the late fifteenth to early sixteenth century. With thirty-four large miniatures in the style of the Flemish School, it is one of the most elaborately decorated manuscripts in the collection of the National Library of Wales in Aberystwyth. It retains an original binding of wooden boards covered in velvet from the early sixteenth century. The volume contains the book plate of Watkin Williams of Penbedw.

== Similarities to other manuscripts ==
The first section of the manuscript (ff. 1-185v), La Passion de Nostre Seigneur (The Passion of Our Lord), which was originally translated from Latin into French for Isabelle of Bavaria in 1398, is almost identical to several other Passion de Jésus-Christ manuscripts such as Bibliothèque de l'Arsenal MSS. 2038 and 2386, and Bibliothèque Mazarine MS. 949.

== Depiction of the death of Elizabeth of York ==
Thirty-three of the thirty-four miniatures accompany this text. The presentation page (f. 9) shows Henry VII and his children, Margaret, Mary and the future Henry VIII, mourning the death of Elizabeth of York, his wife and their mother. The king is wearing robes of mourning; in the background his daughters, wearing black hoods, kneel in front of a fire; and behind them their brother Henry, dressed in a green smock, clasps his arms around his head and weeps on his mother's deathbed.

== The mirror of death ==
A poem Le miroir de la mort (The mirror of death) by Georges Chastellain is the second text in the manuscript (ff. 186-205v).

== Donation to the National Library ==
Gwendoline and Margaret Davies of Gregynog purchased this manuscript and donated it to the National Library in 1921. It was one of the manuscripts that were not included in the sale of the Peniarth Manuscripts to Sir John Williams.

== Binding ==
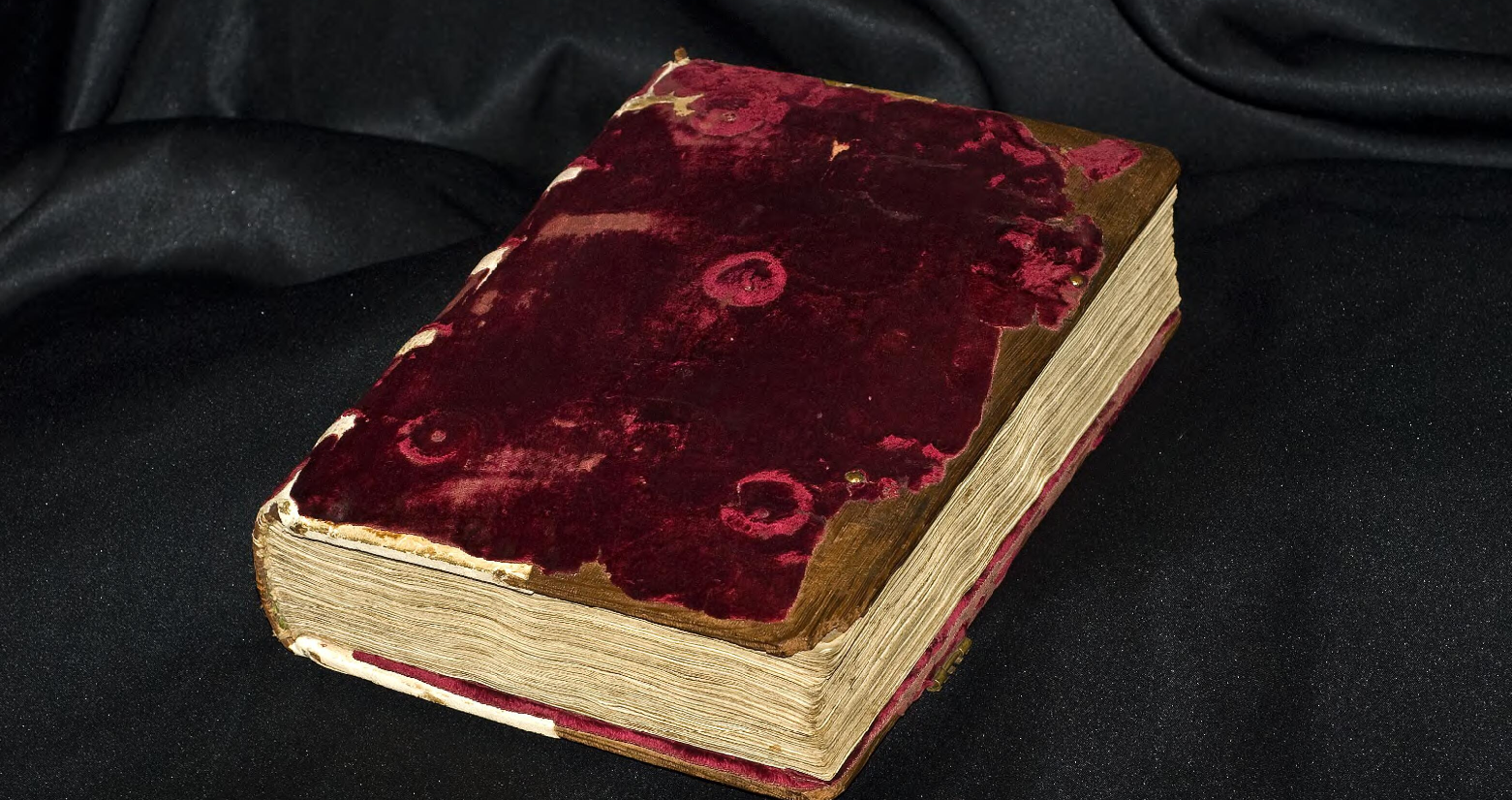
The medieval crimson velvet binding of the Vaux Passional

The Vaux Passional is a rare example in the National Library of Wales of a manuscript from the middle ages that retains its original late-medieval binding. The wooden boards, which are visible in places, are covered in crimson velvet. There are marks on the upper cover that were left by the brass bosses that adorned the volume, which was probably bound in a London workshop early in the 16th century.

Peniarth 481 is also bound in its original crimson velvet and retains the five brass bosses.

== Full-page miniatures ==
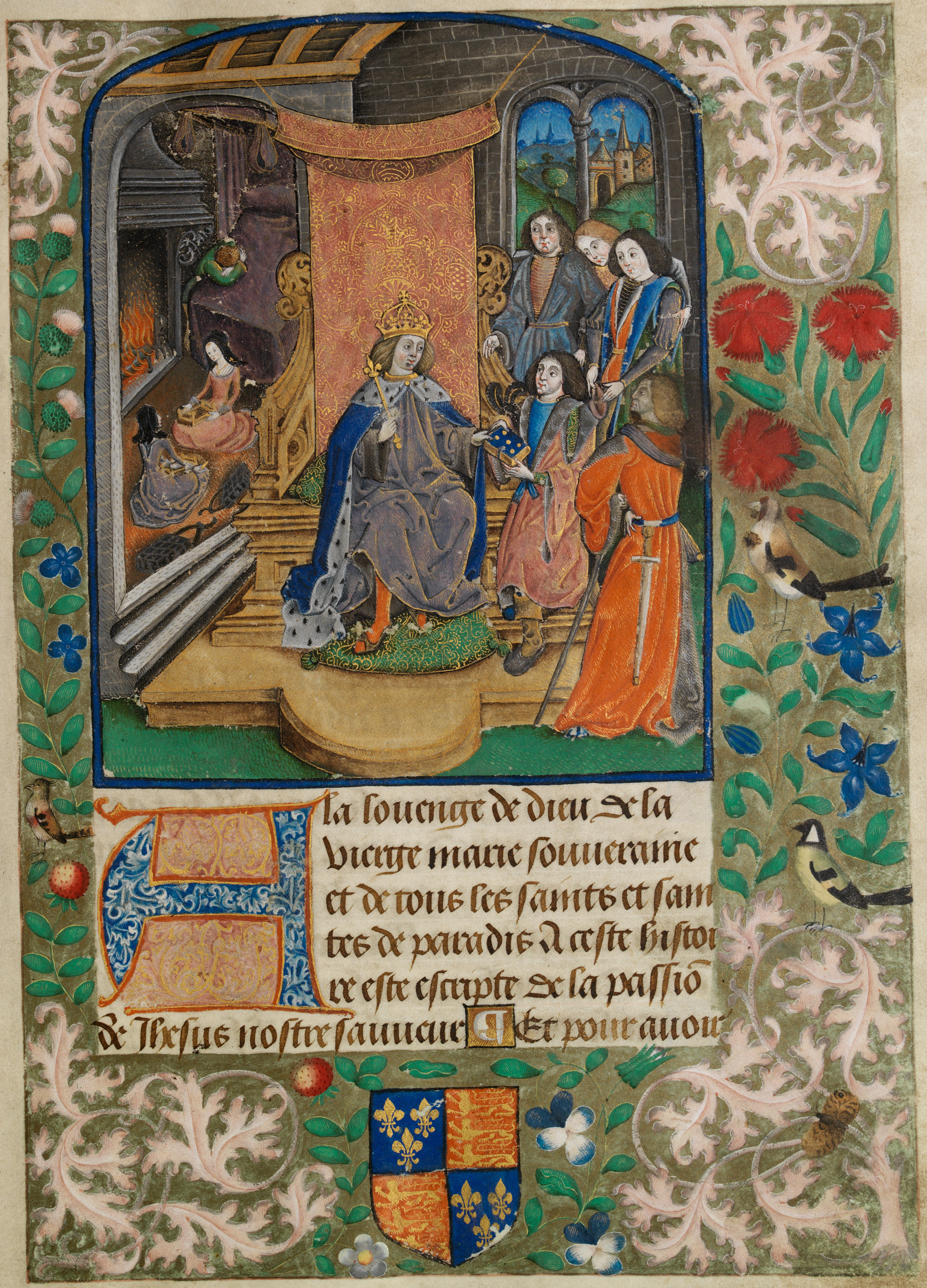
f. 9 Presentation page

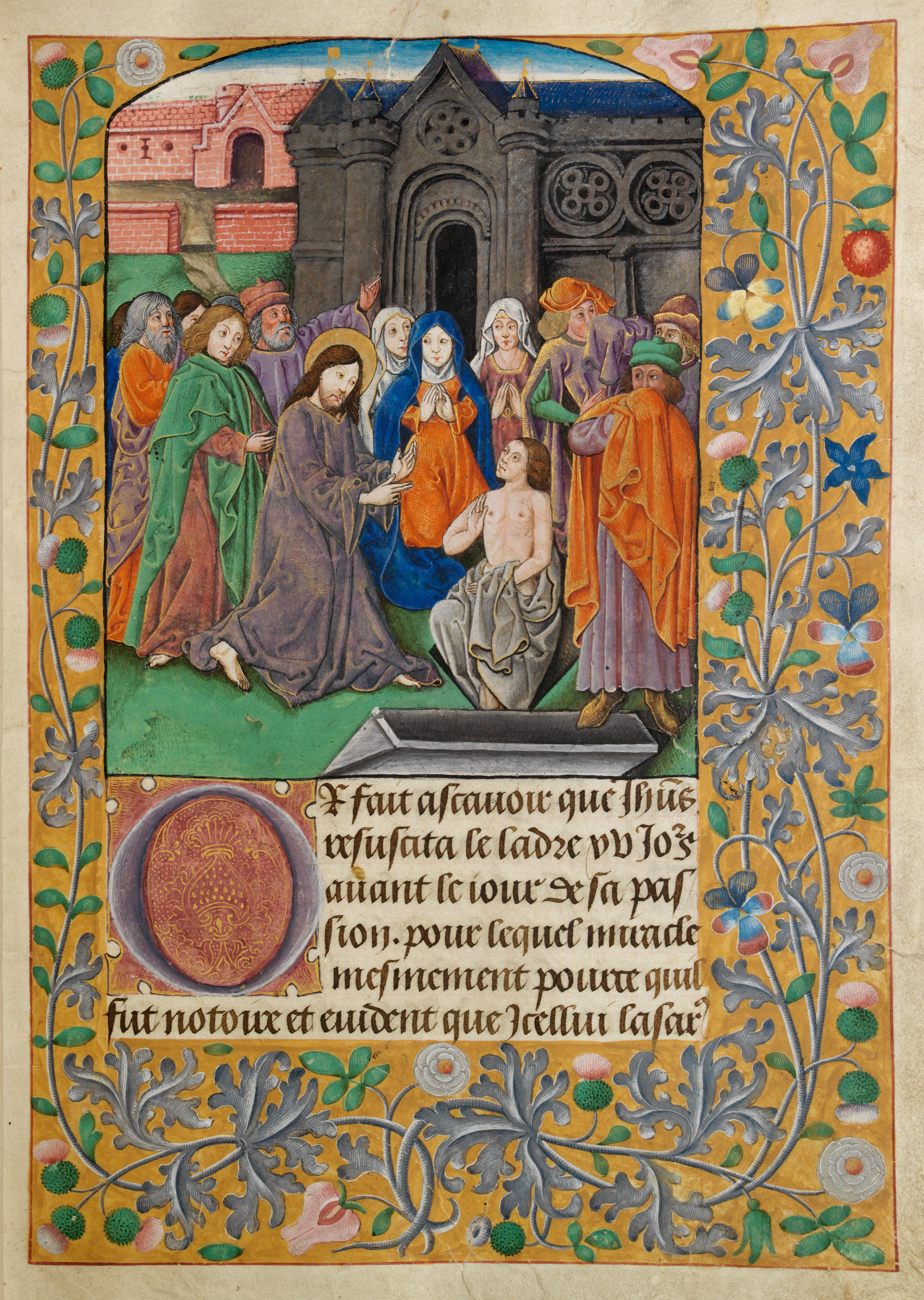
f. 11r Raising of Lazarus

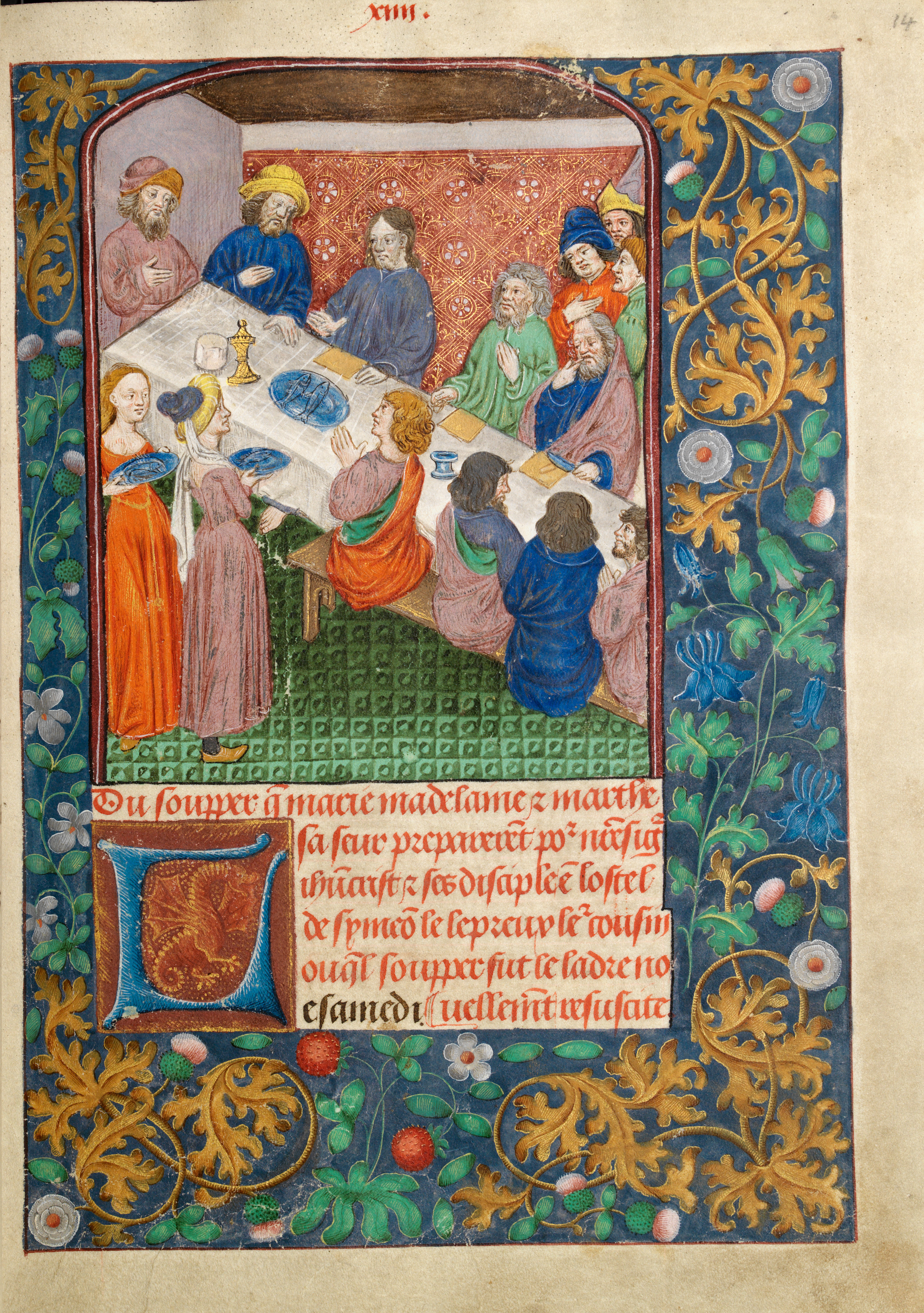
f. 14 House of Symeon

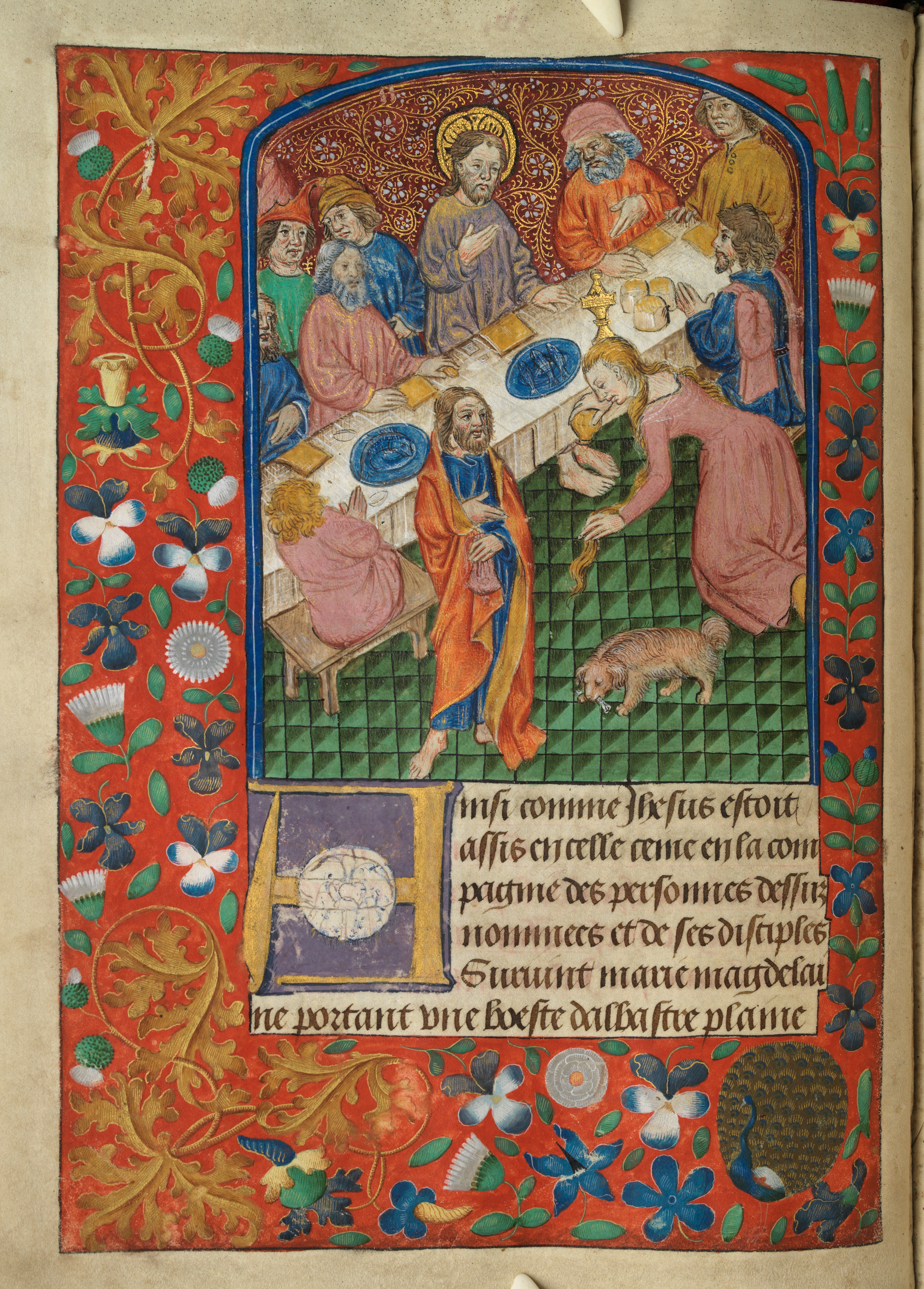
f. 15v Christ and St Mary Magdalen

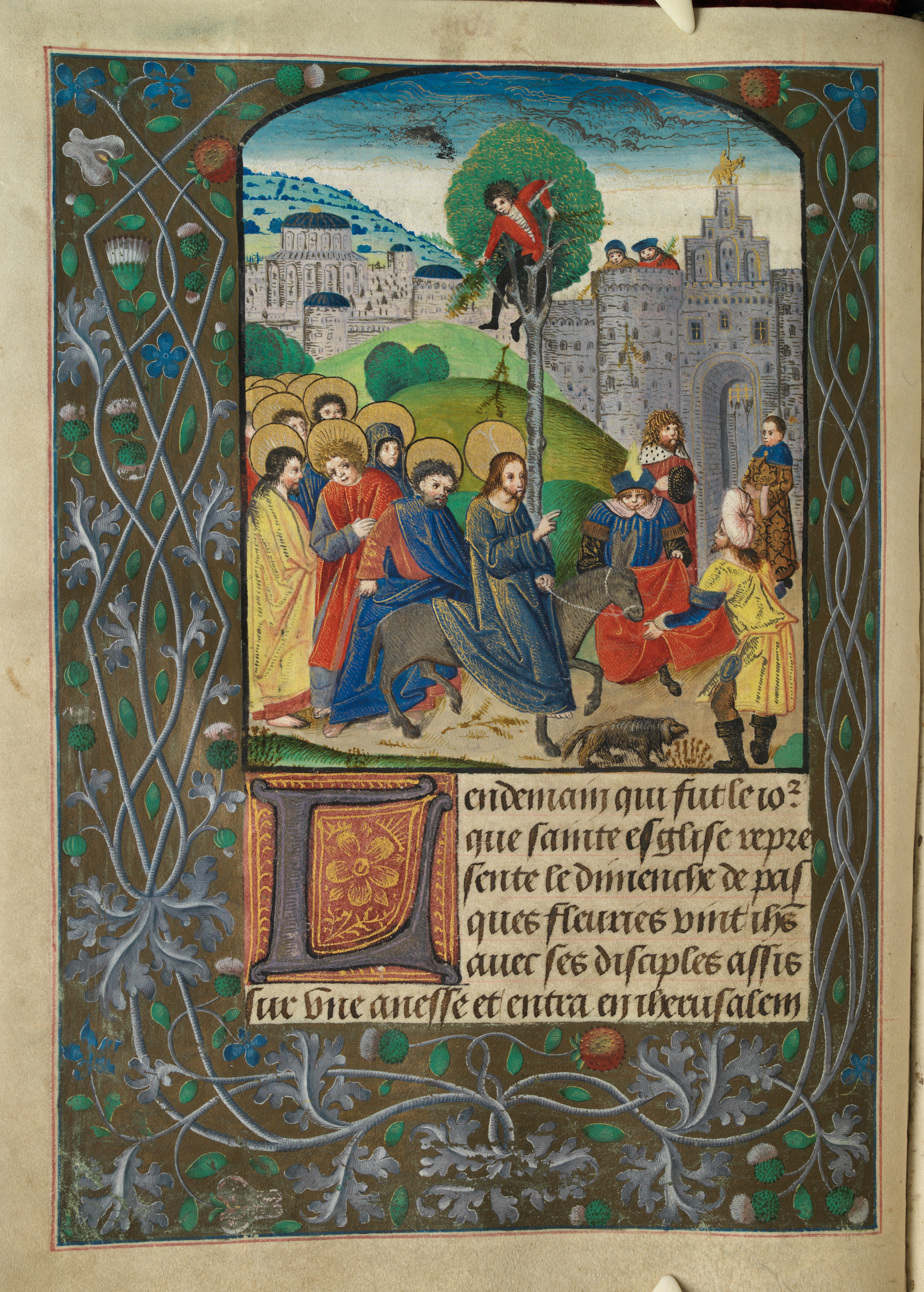
f. 17v Entry into Jerusalem

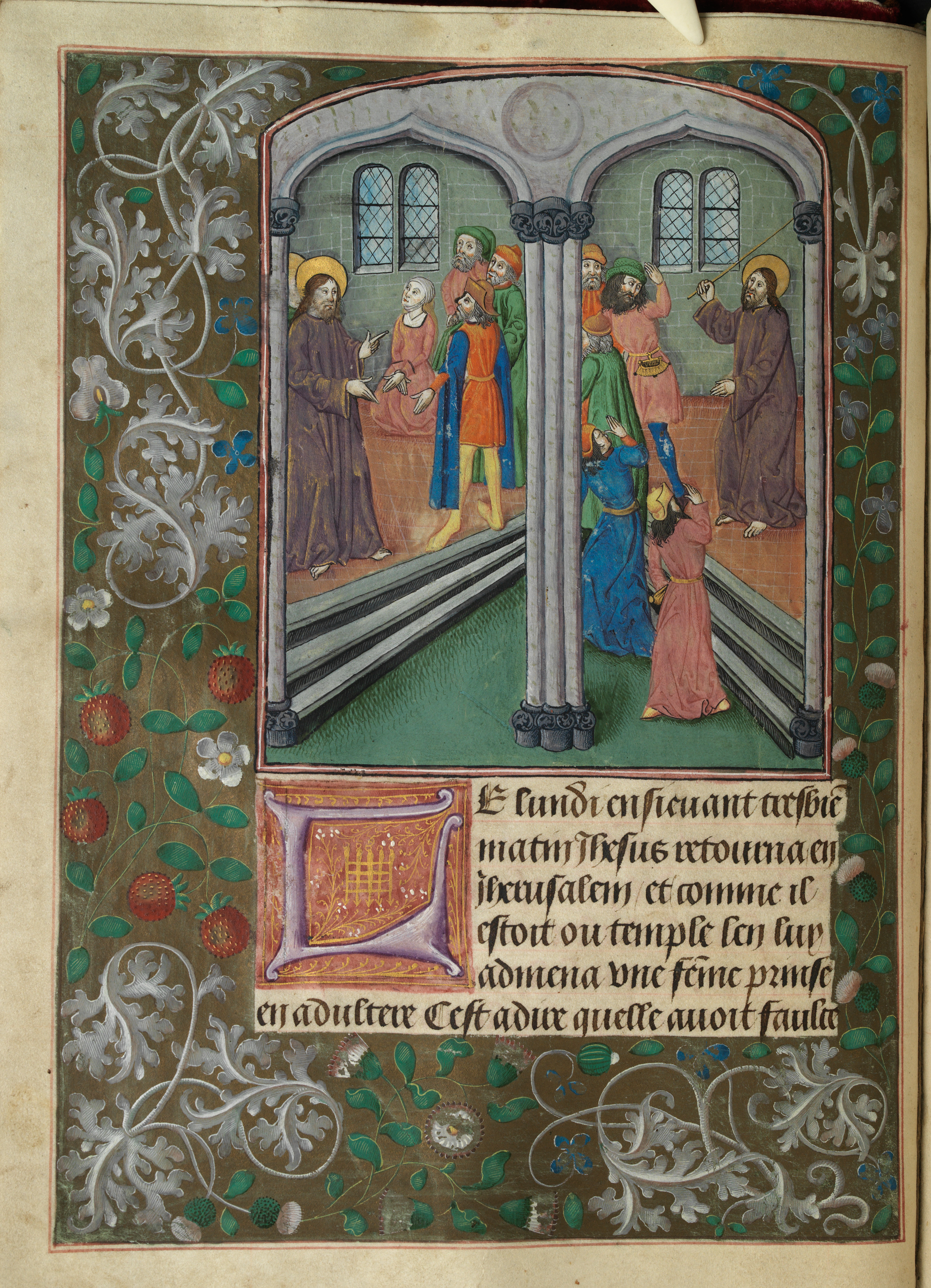
f. 20v Two scenes in the Temple

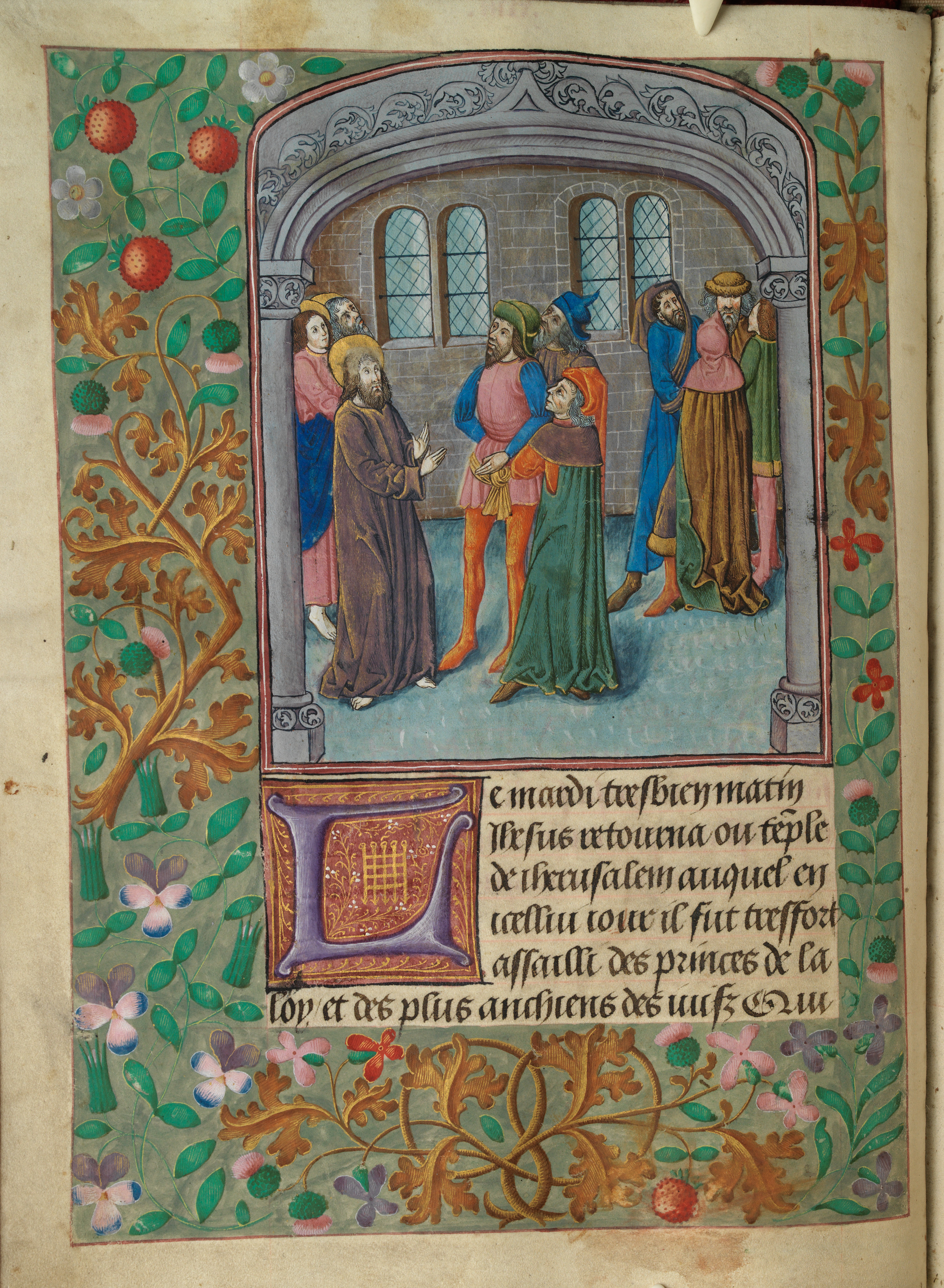
f. 23v Finding in the Temple

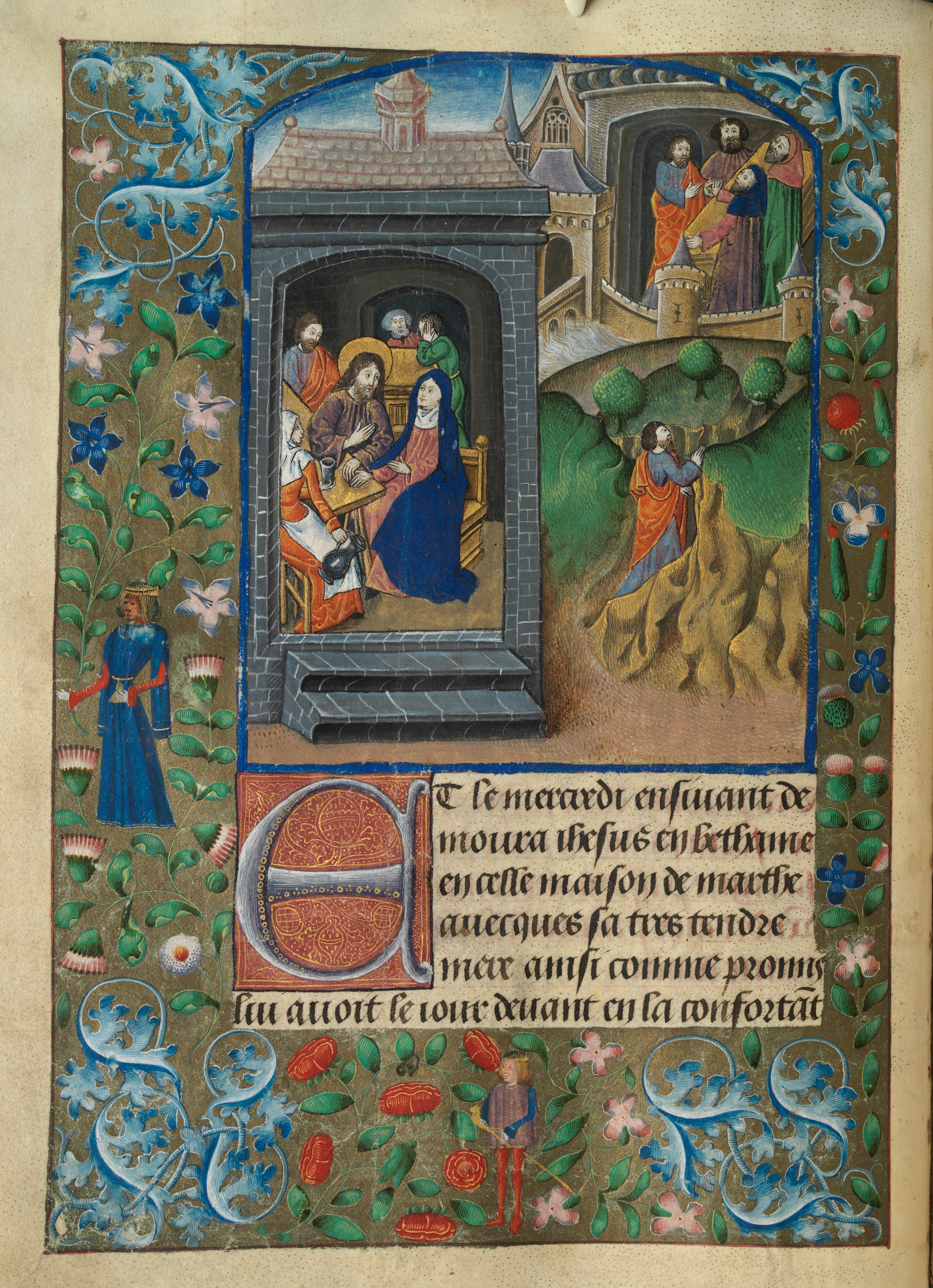
f. 27v Three scenes with Christ and Judas

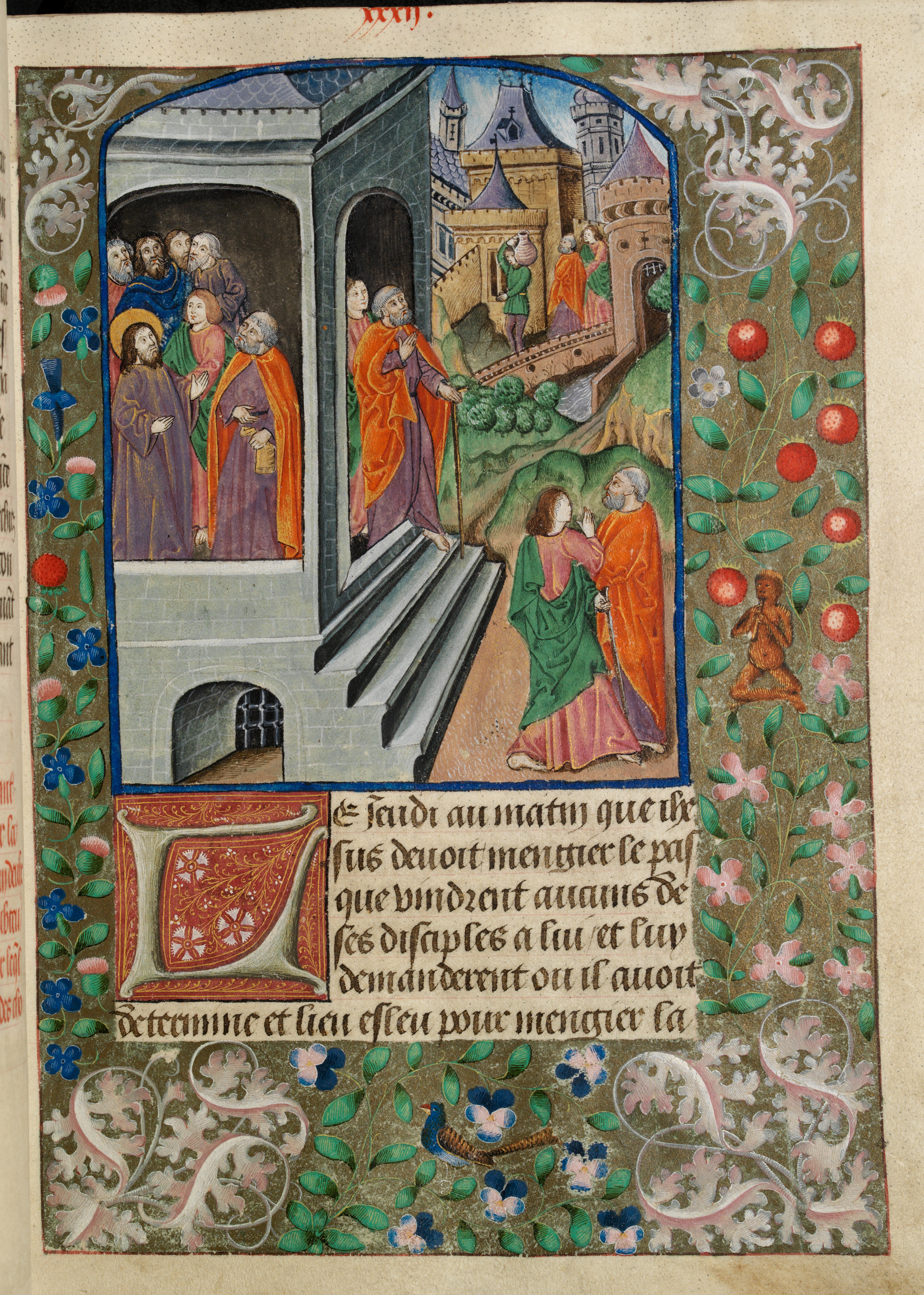
f. 32 St Peter and St John at Passover

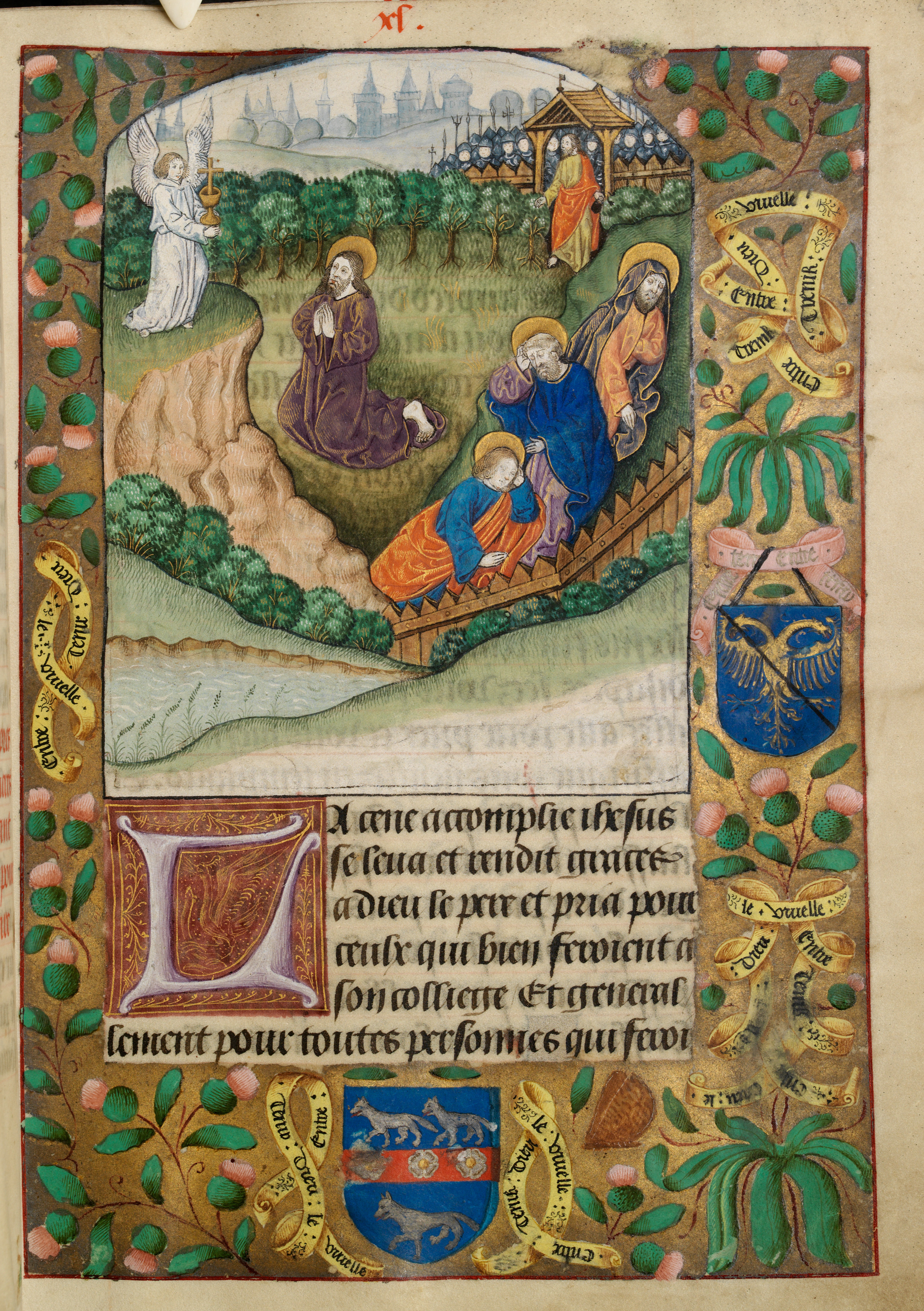
f. 40 Christ at Gethsemane

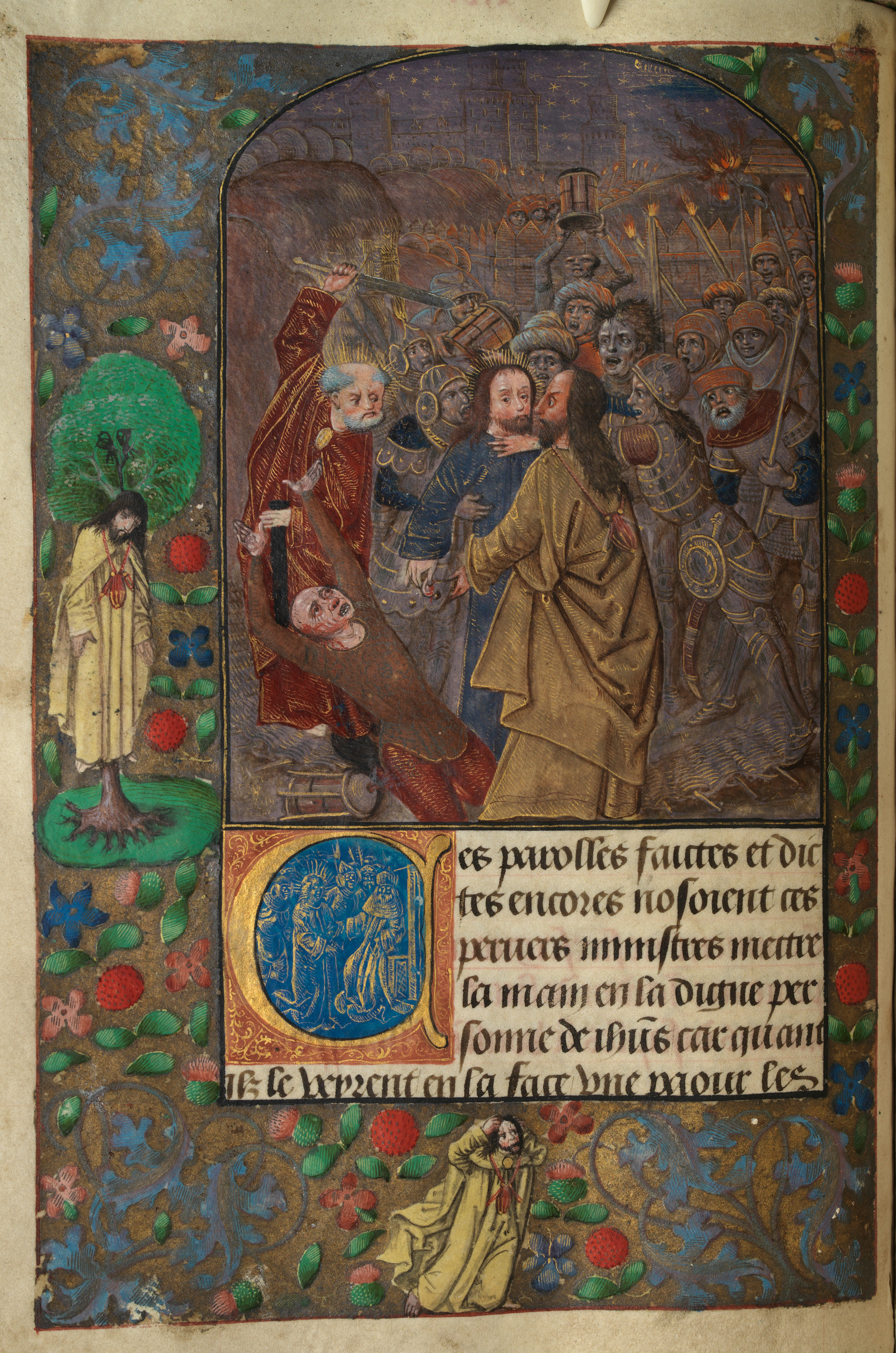
f. 45v Two scenes with St Peter and Judas

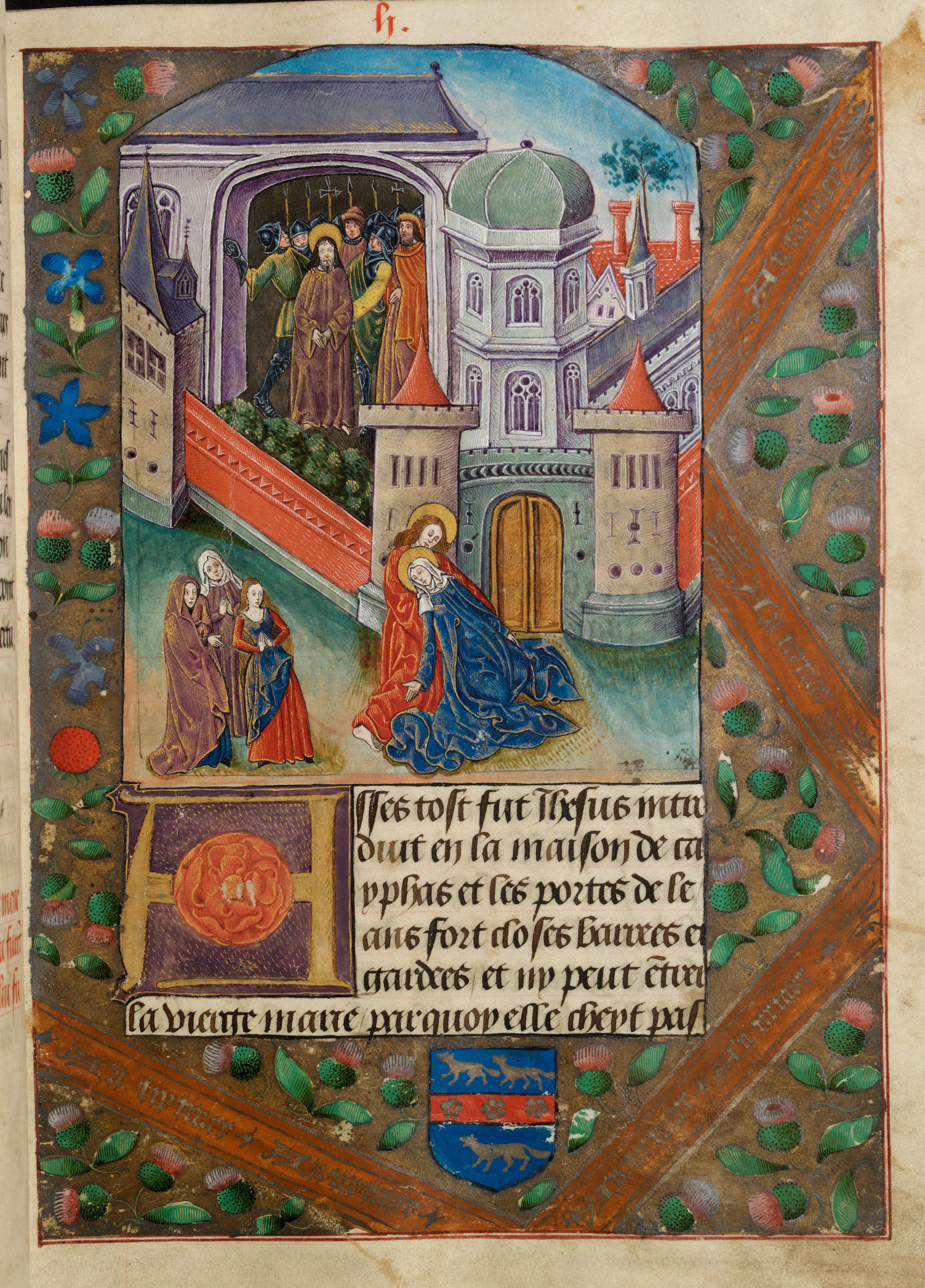
f. 51 St Mary and St John before the high priest

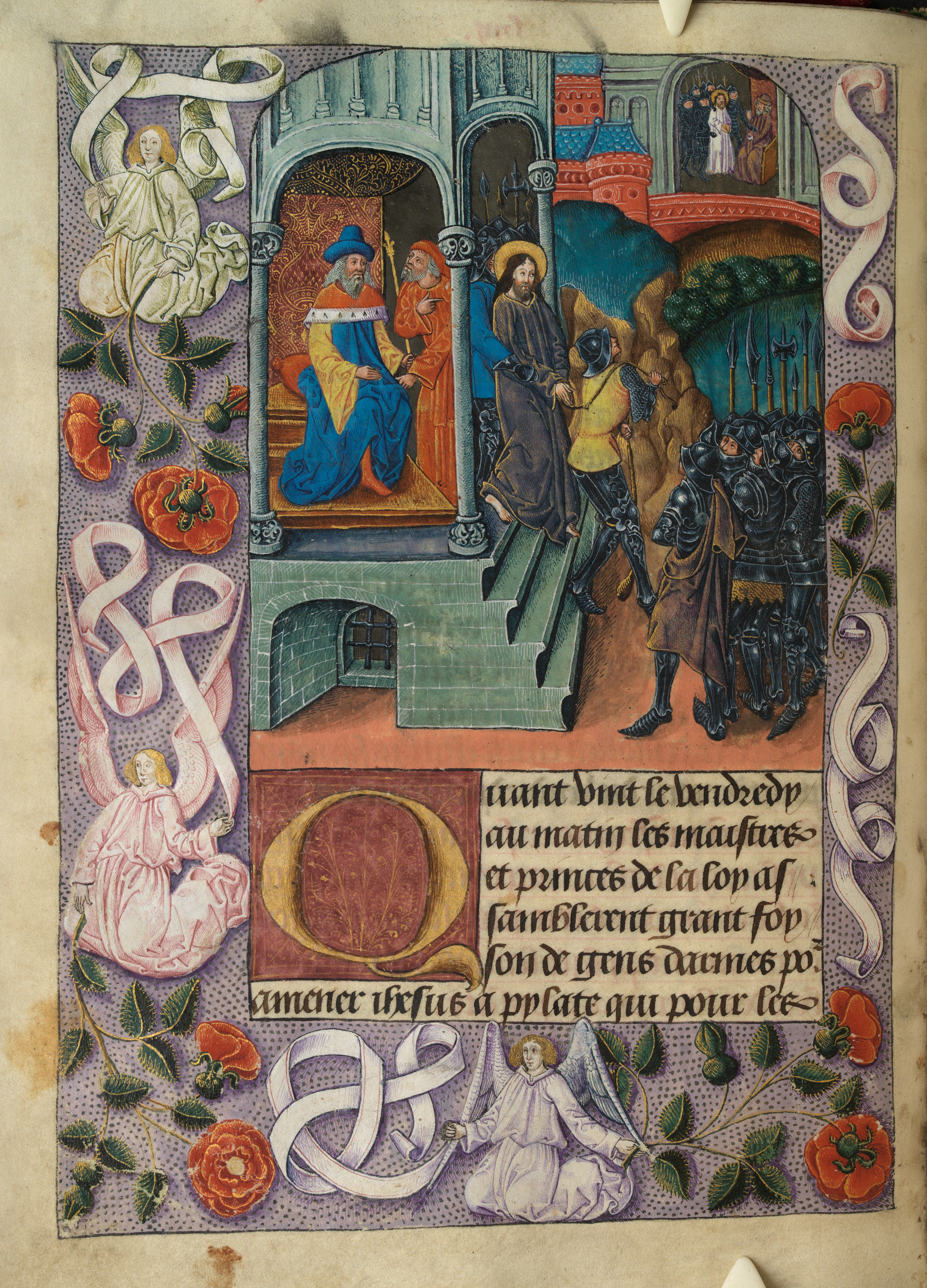
f. 54v Christ before Herod and Pilate

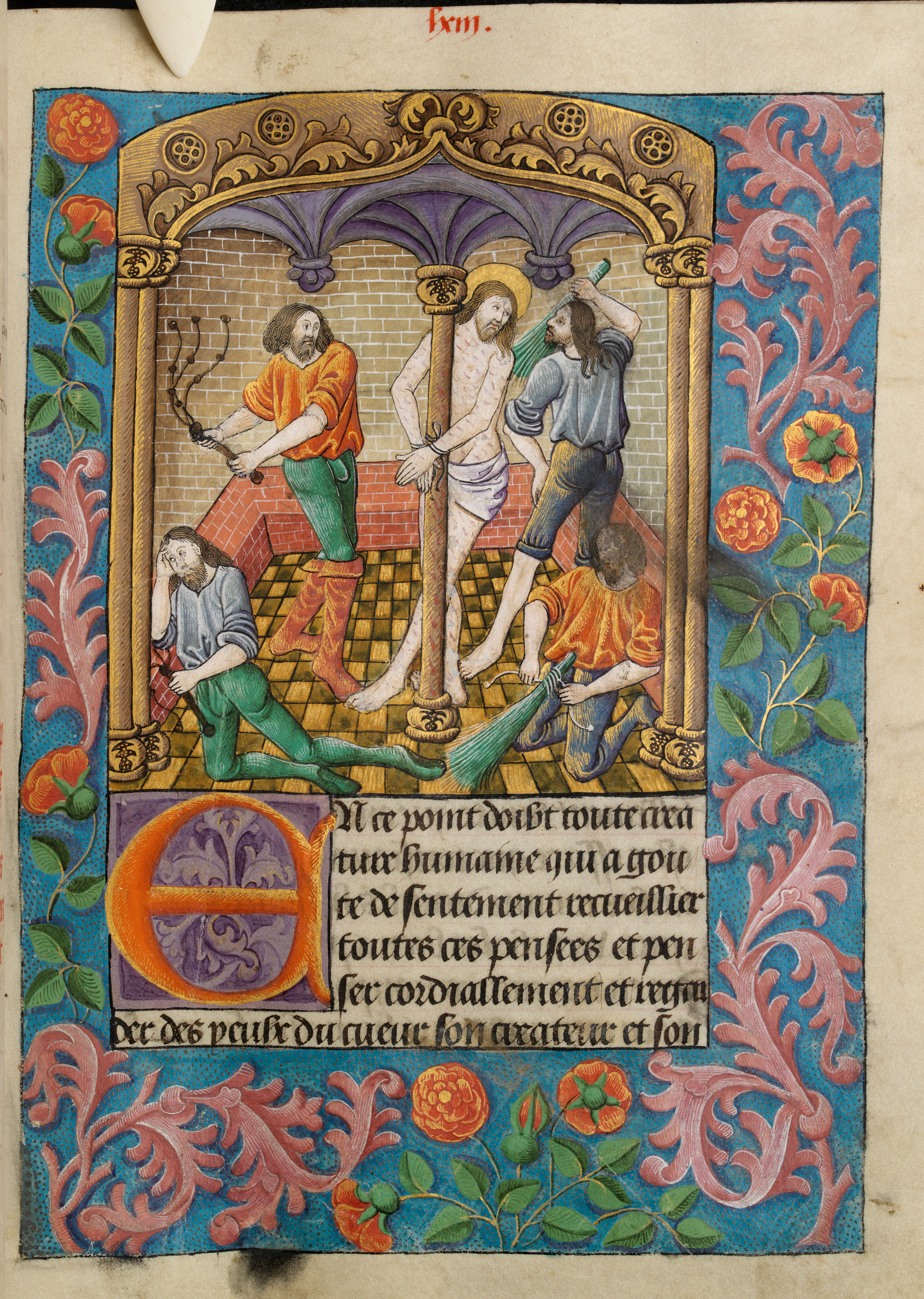
f. 63 Scourging of Christ

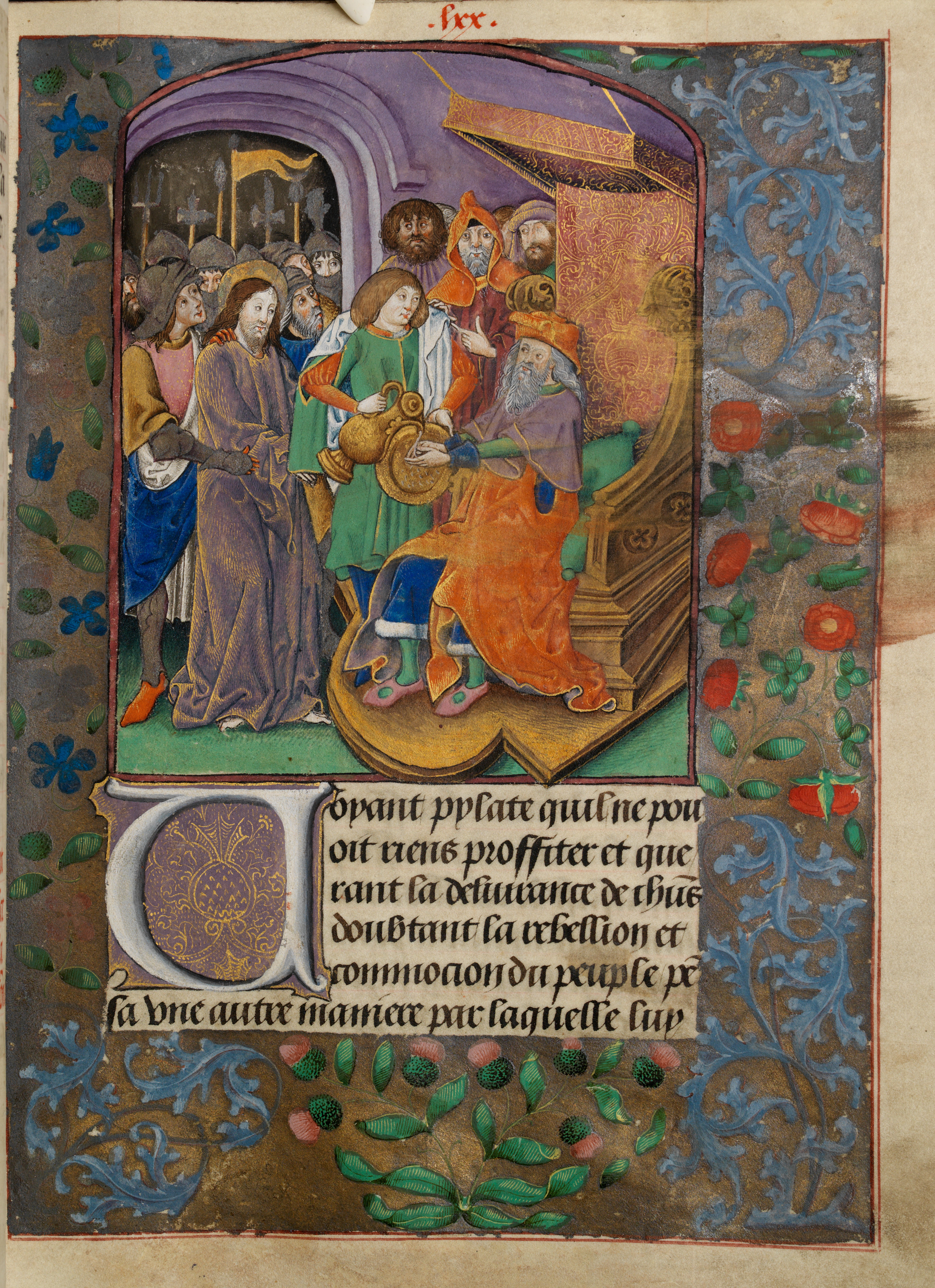
f. 70 Christ before Pilate

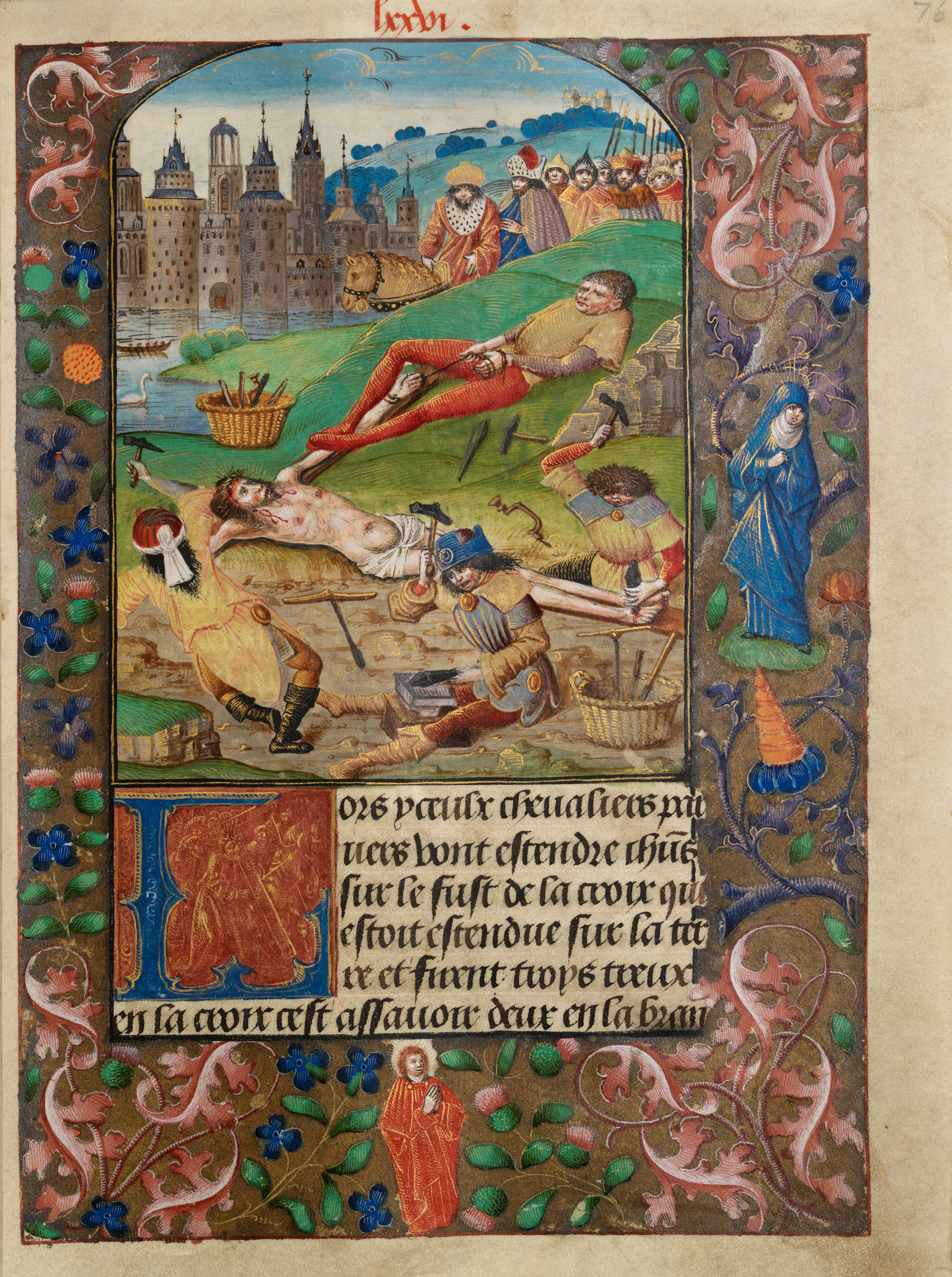
f. 76 Crucifixion of Christ

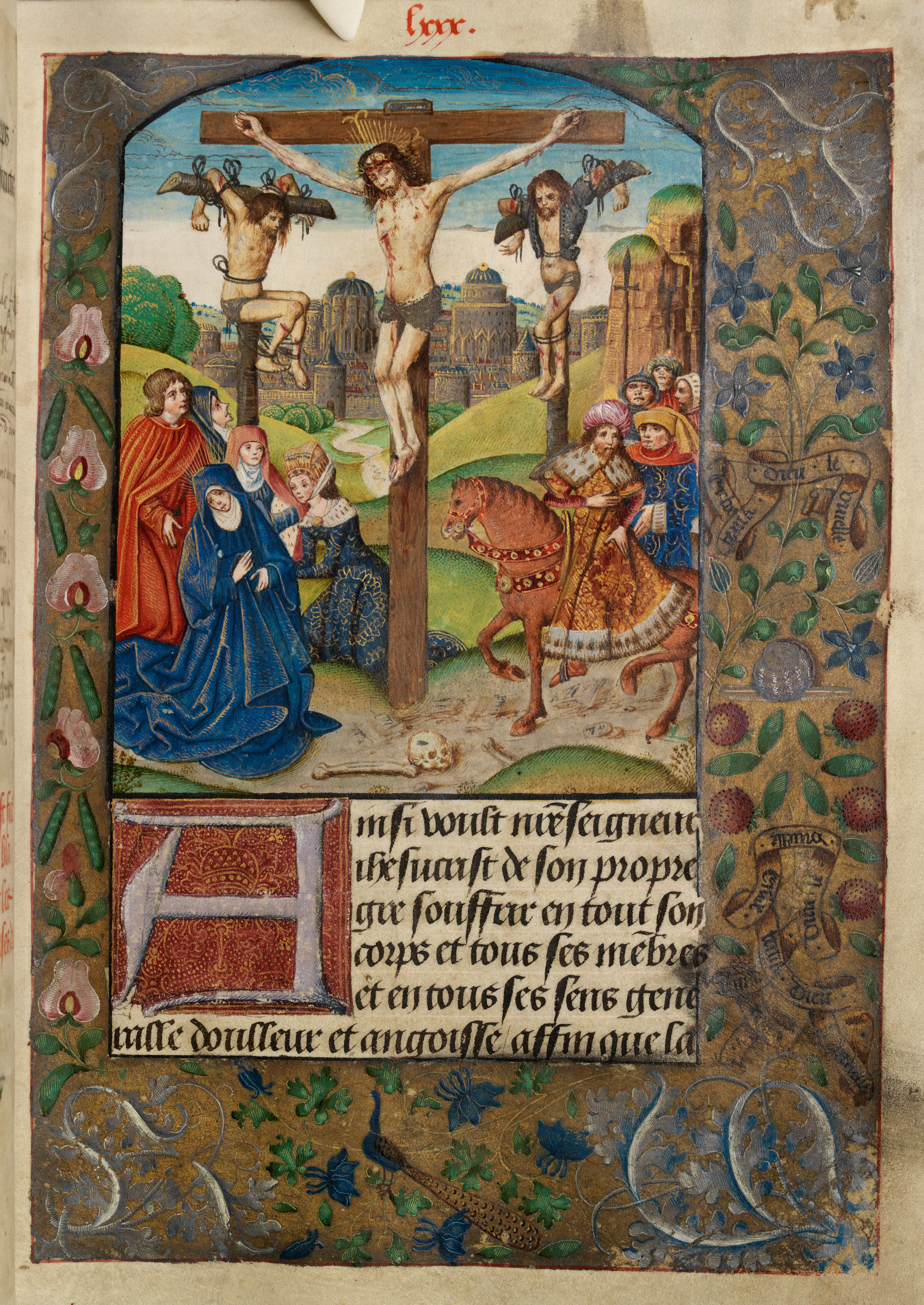
f. 80 Crucifixion with thieves

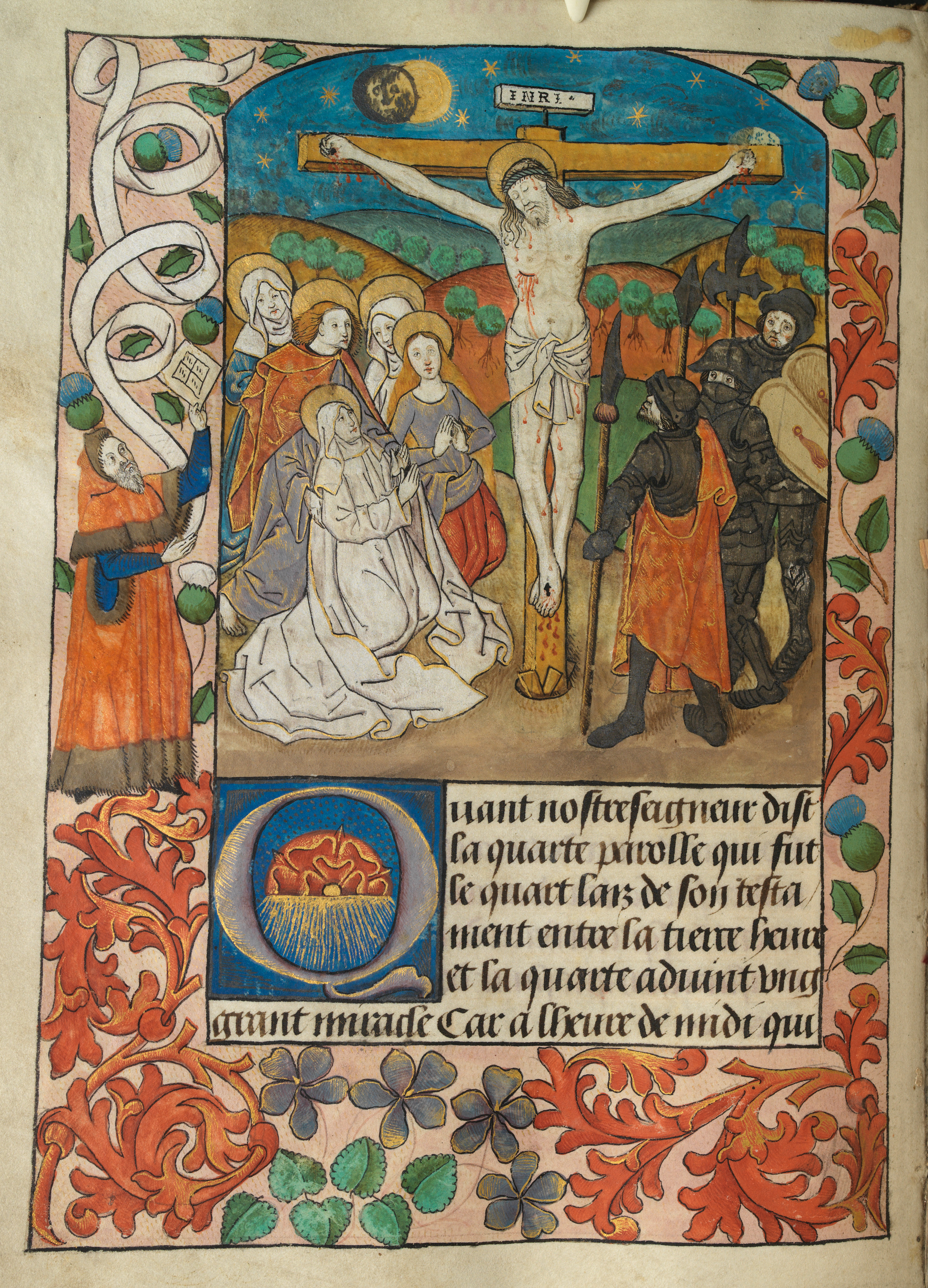
f. 92v Pieta

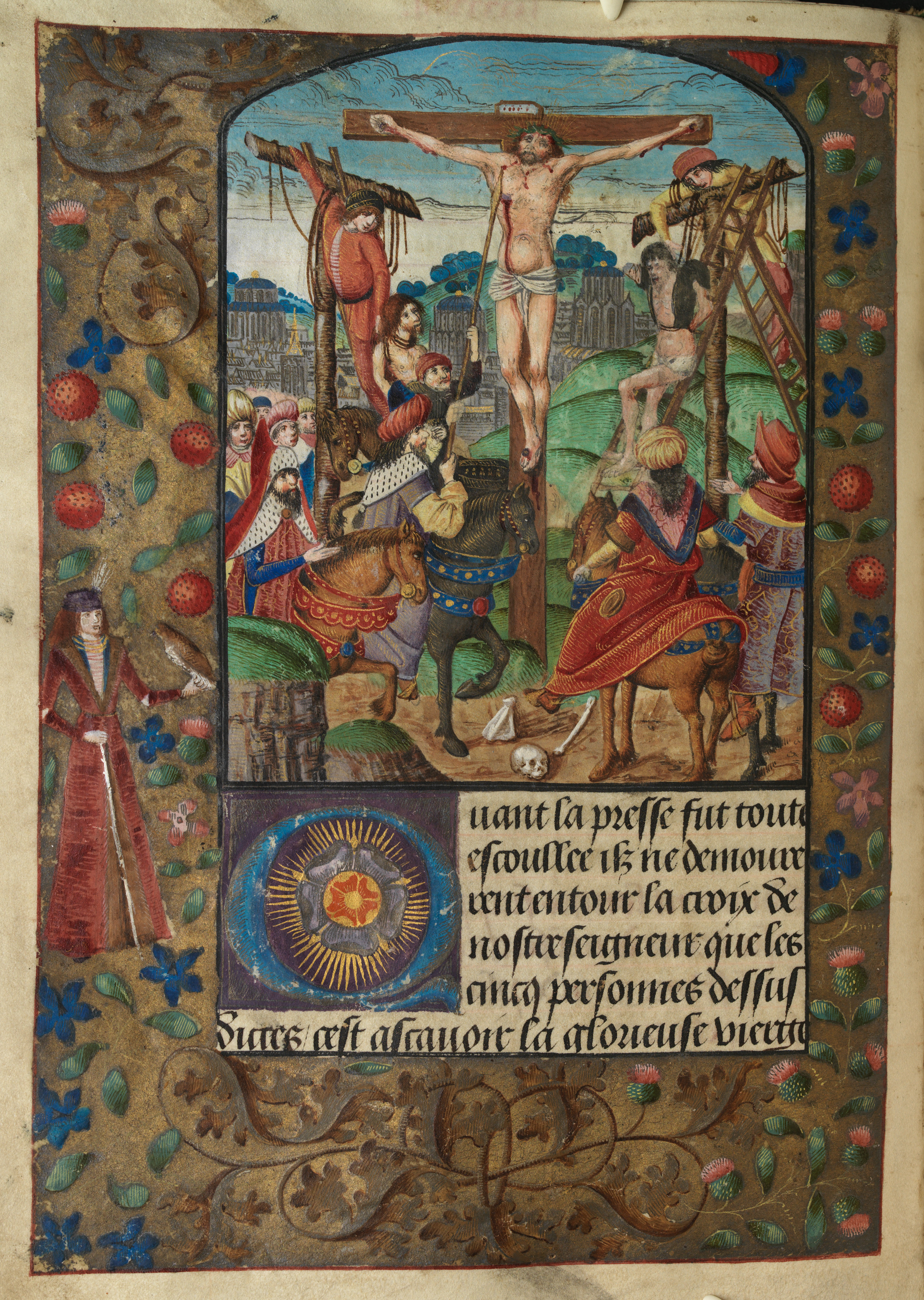
f. 98v Longinus pierces Christ

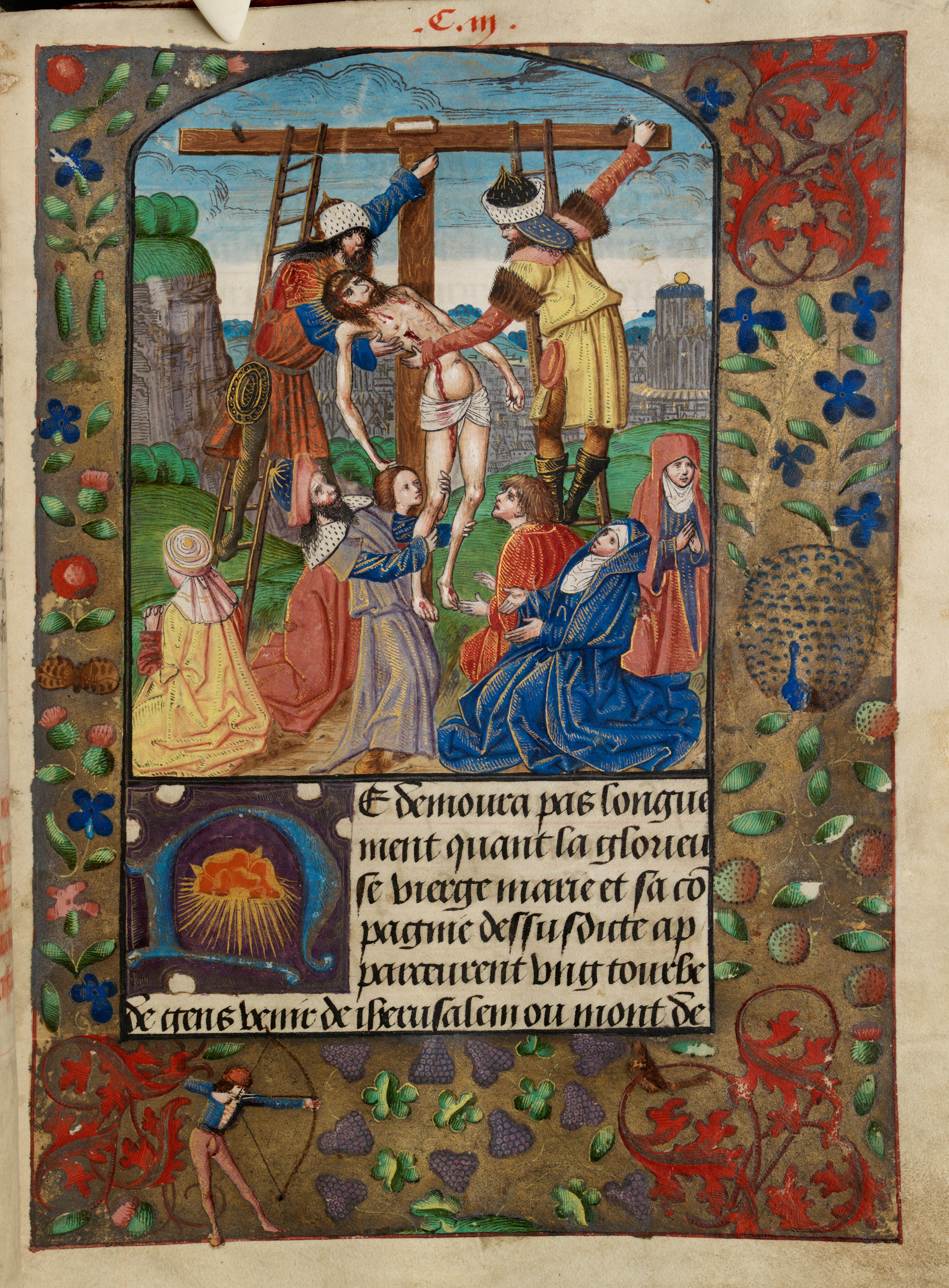
f. 103 Deposition

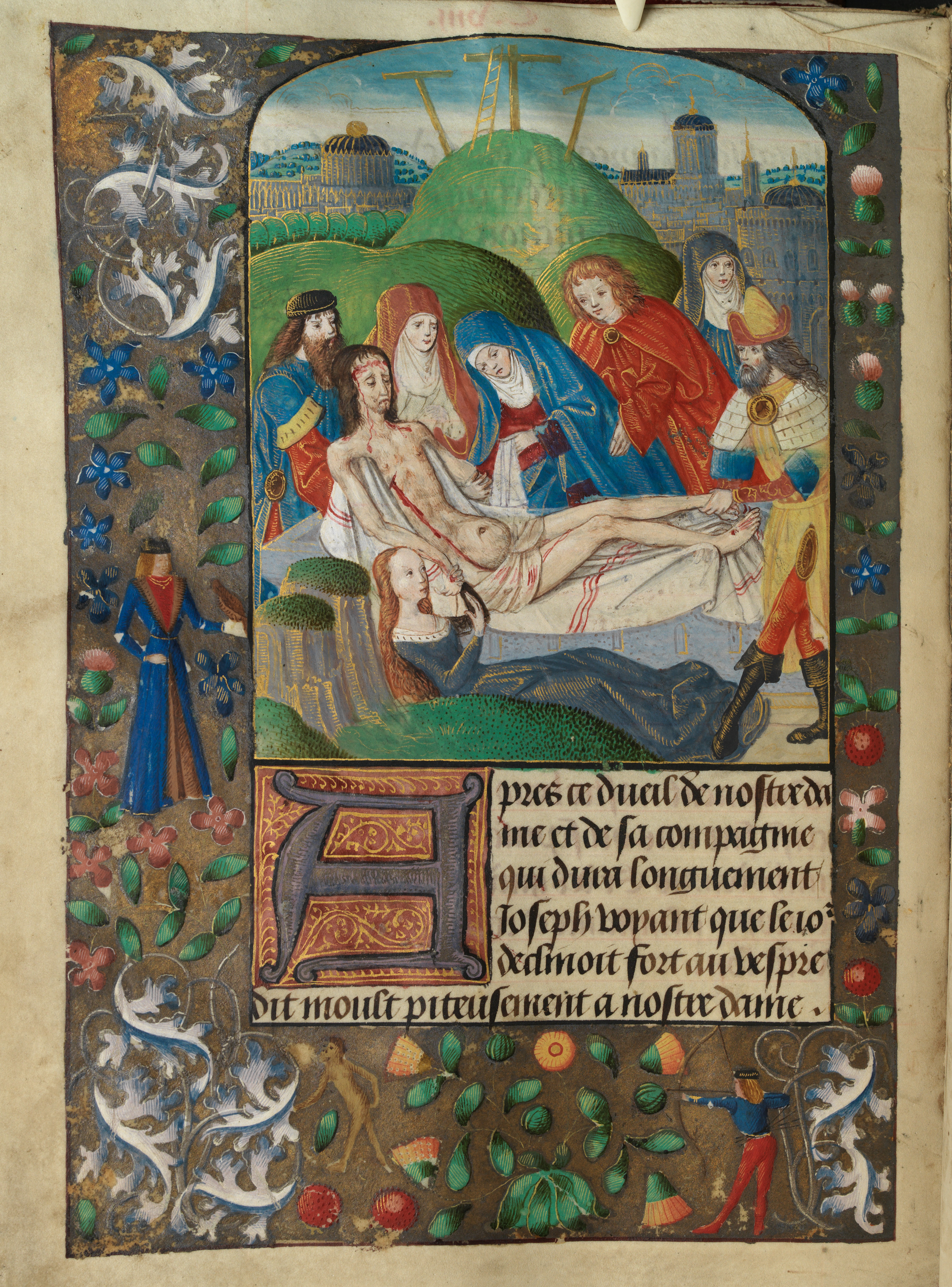
f. 108v Entombment

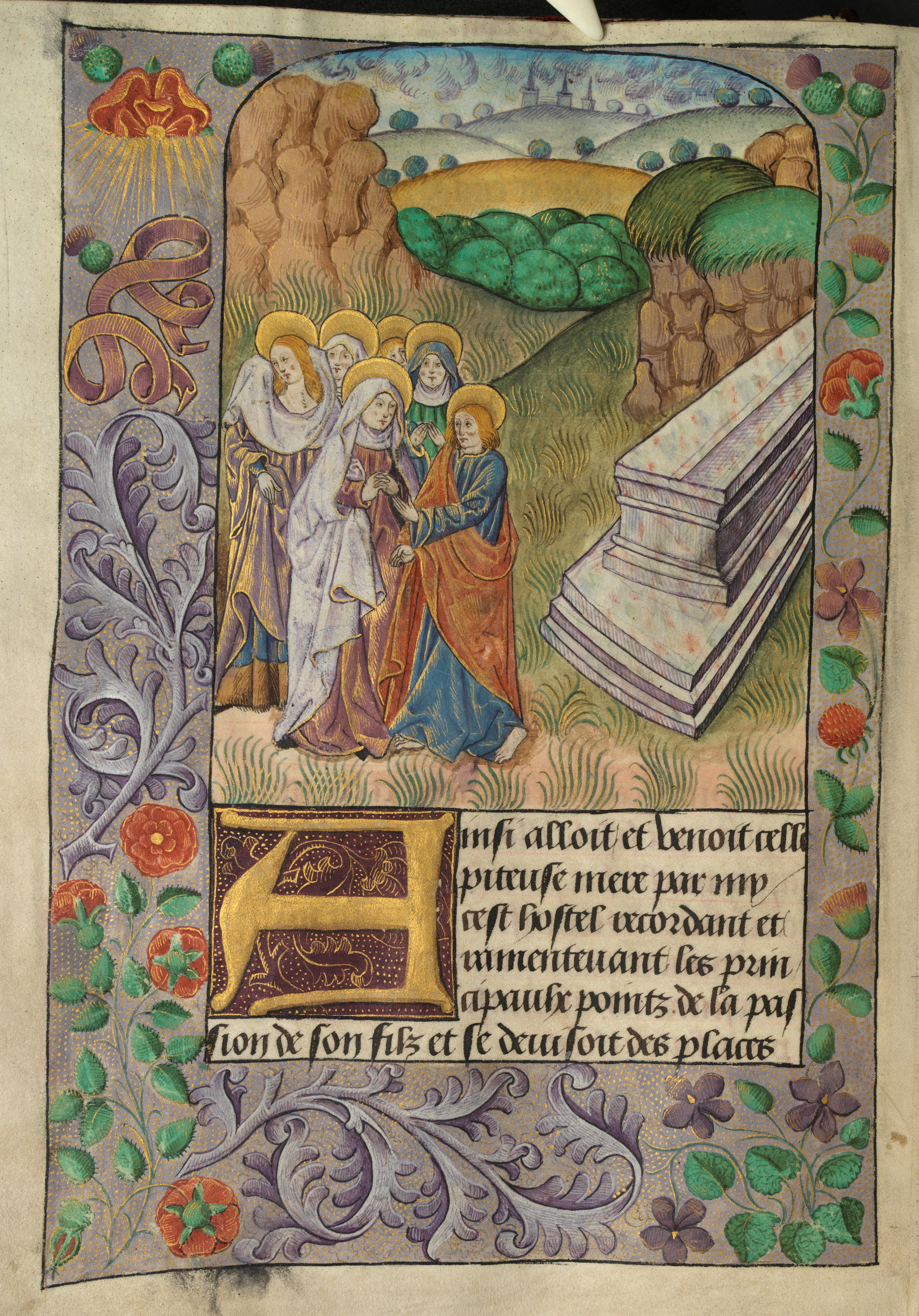
f. 117v Departure from sealed tomb

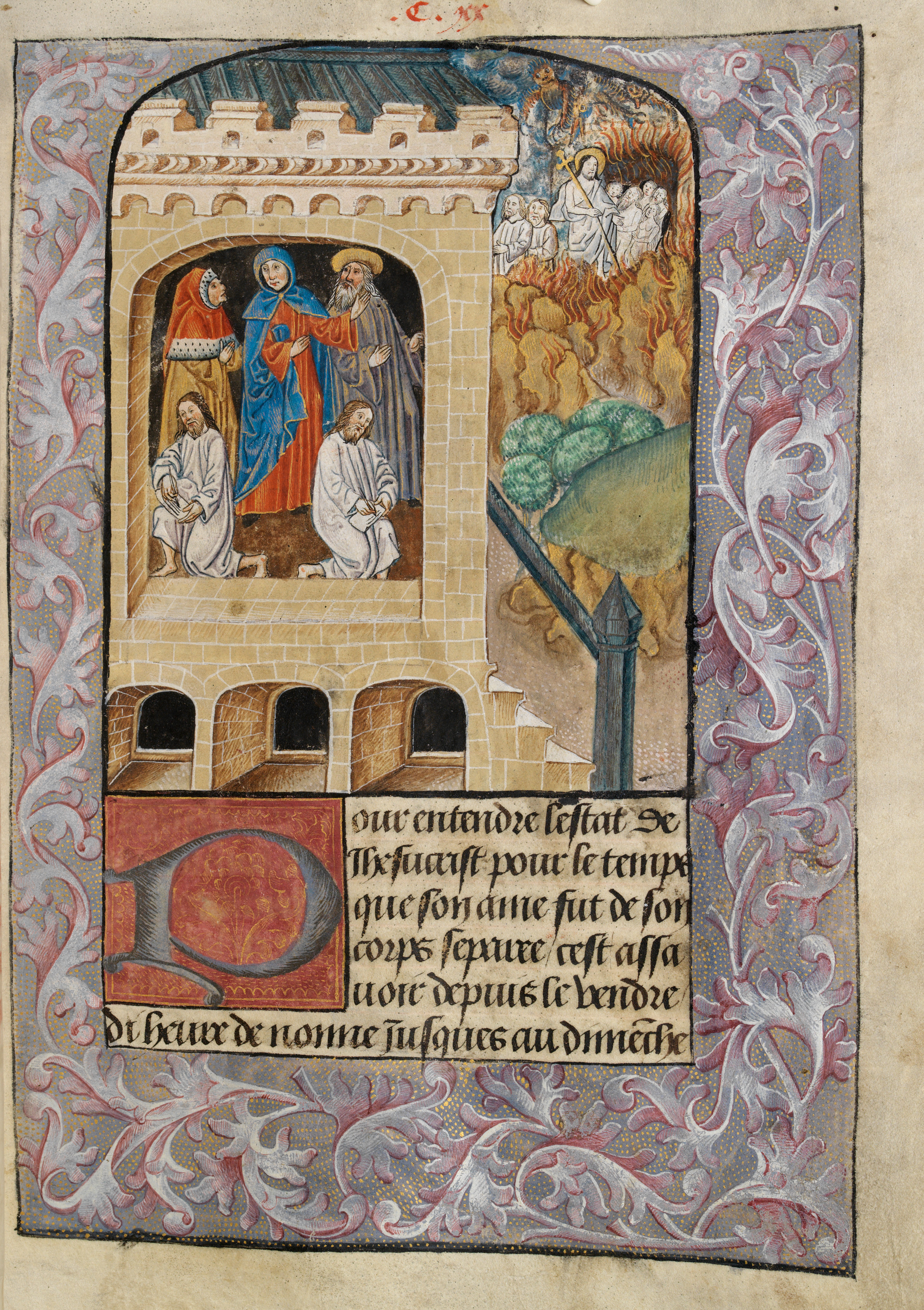
f. 120 Carimes and Lentius

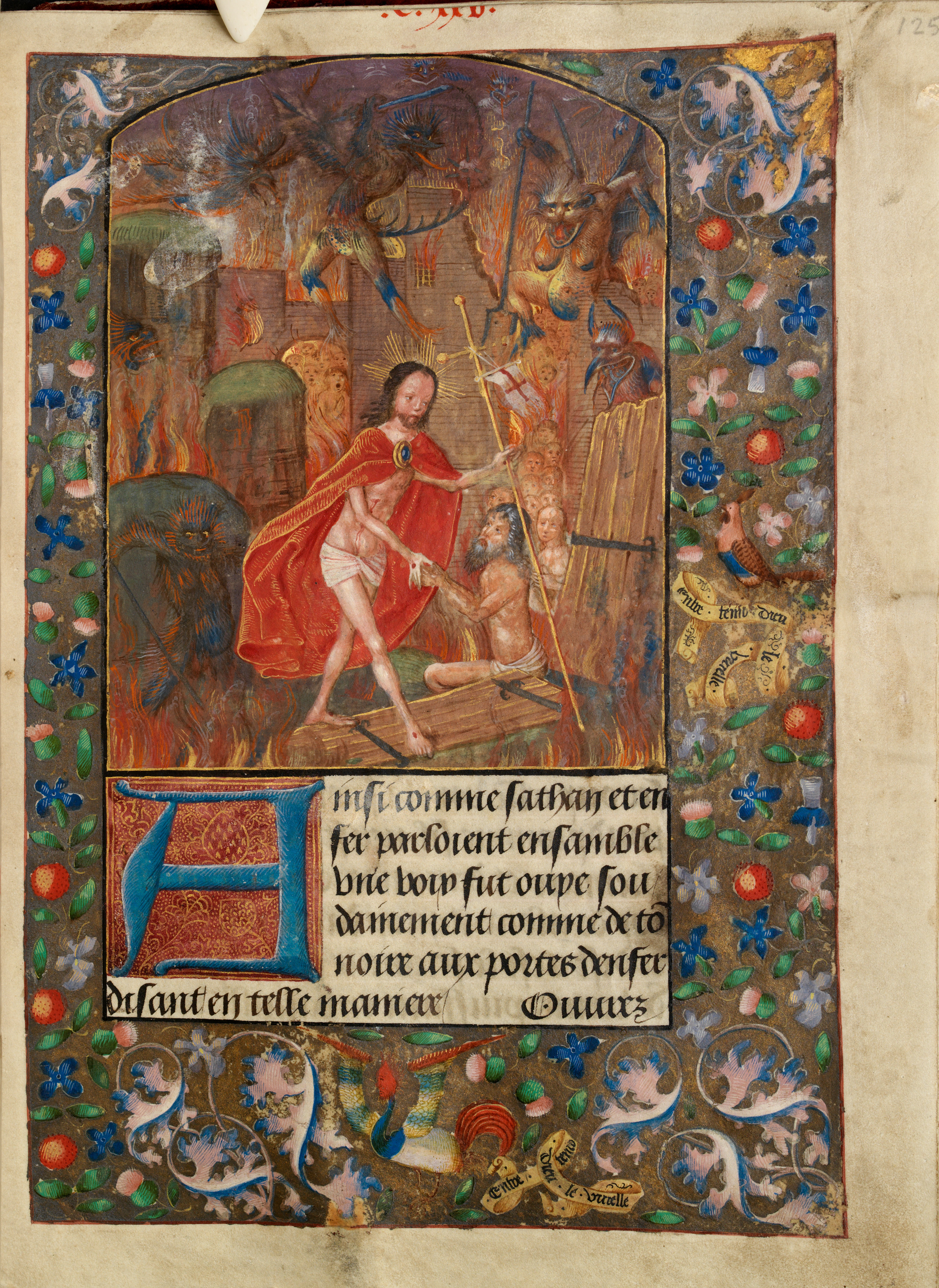
f. 125 Harrowing of Hell

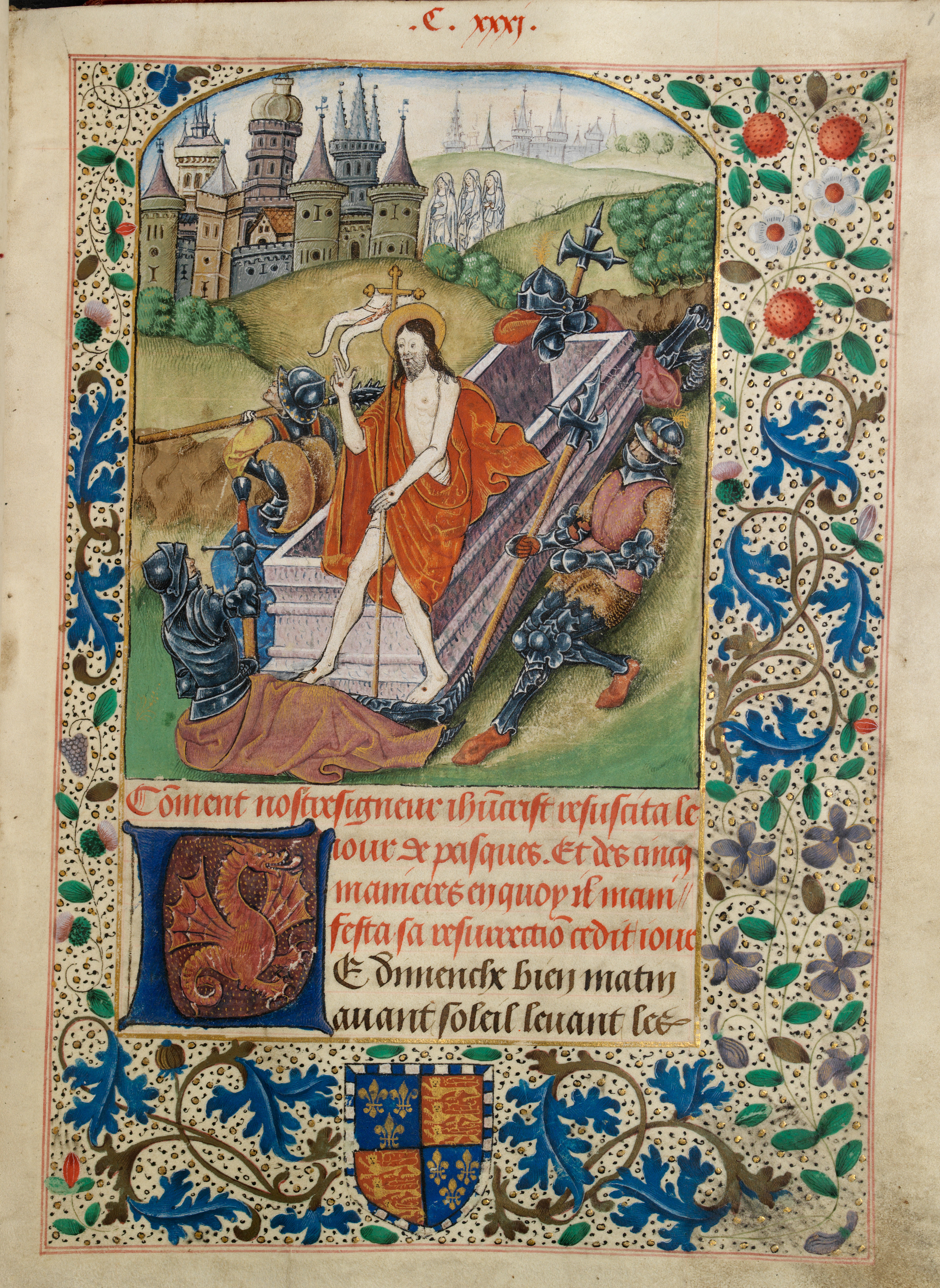
f. 131 Resurrection with Beaufort arms

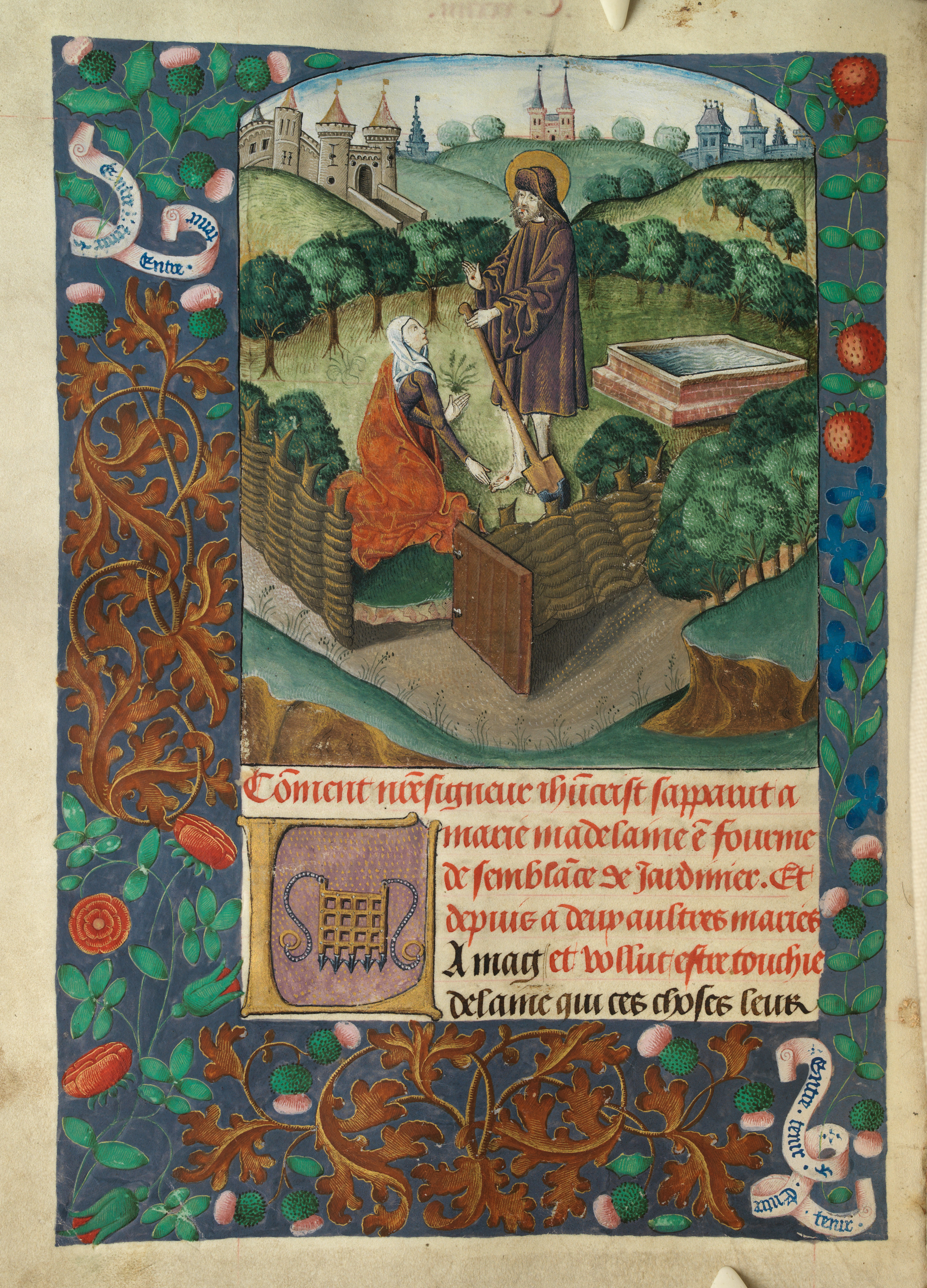
f. 134v Noli me tangere

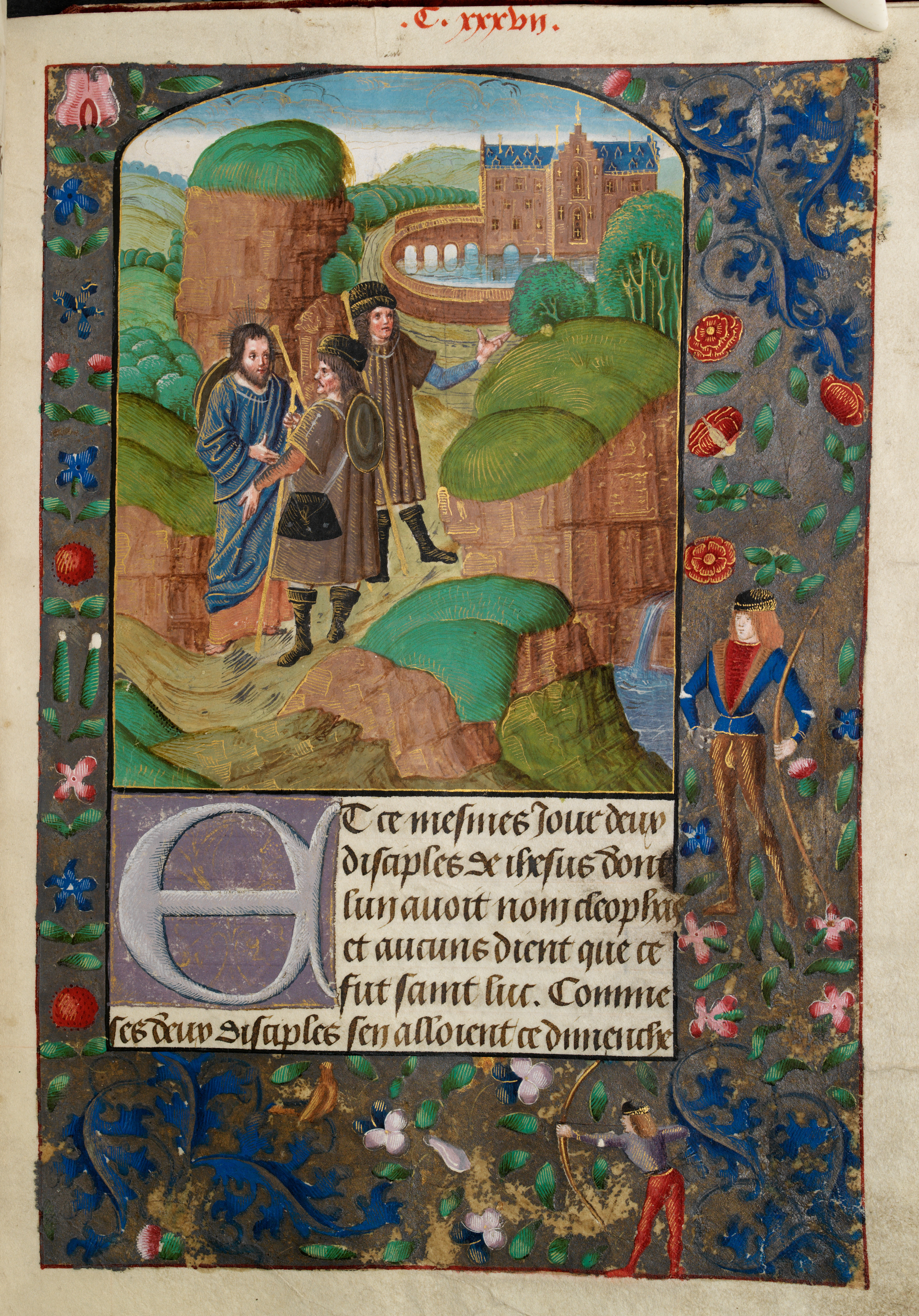
f. 137 Christ at Emmaus

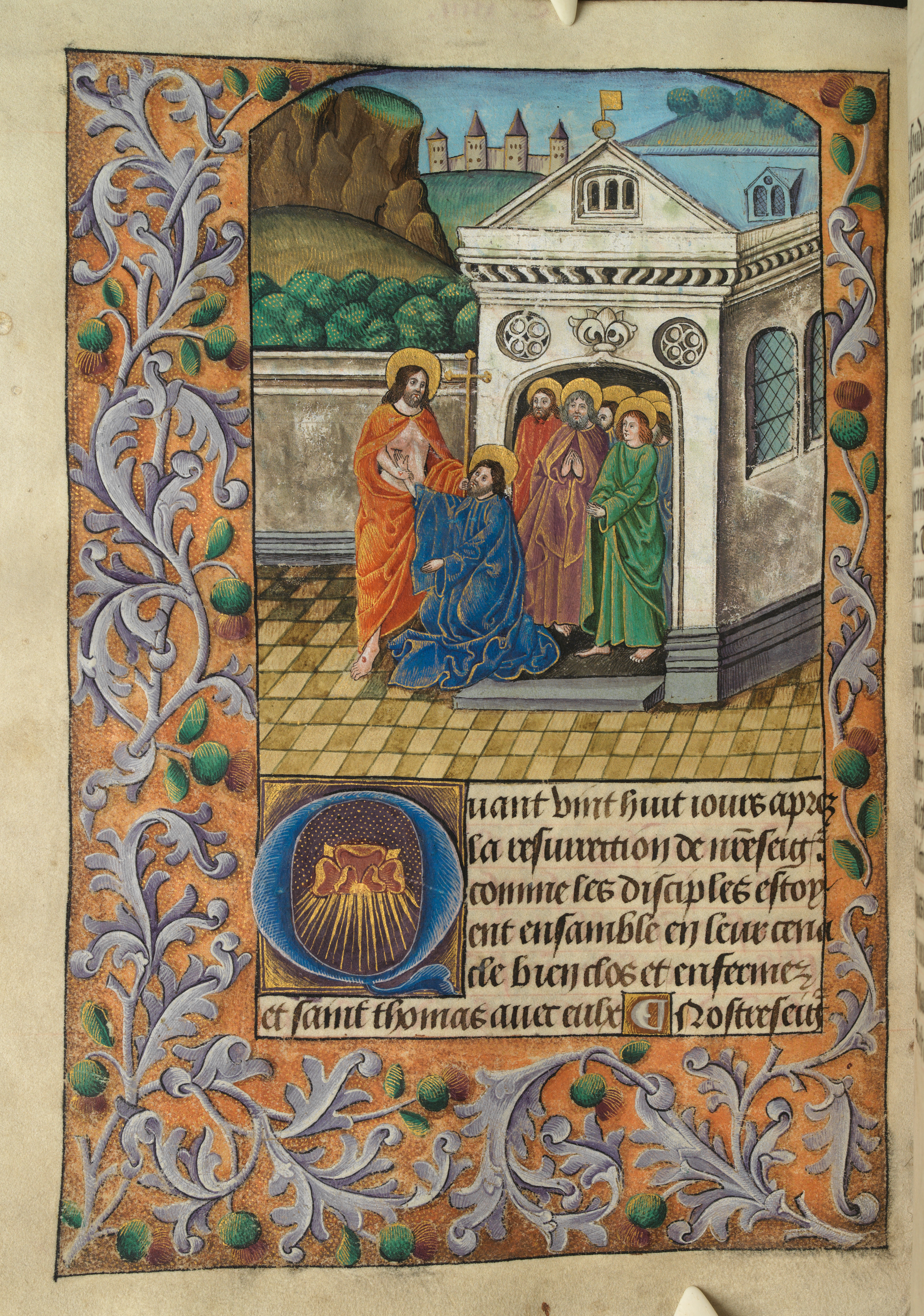
f. 142v Doubts of St Thomas

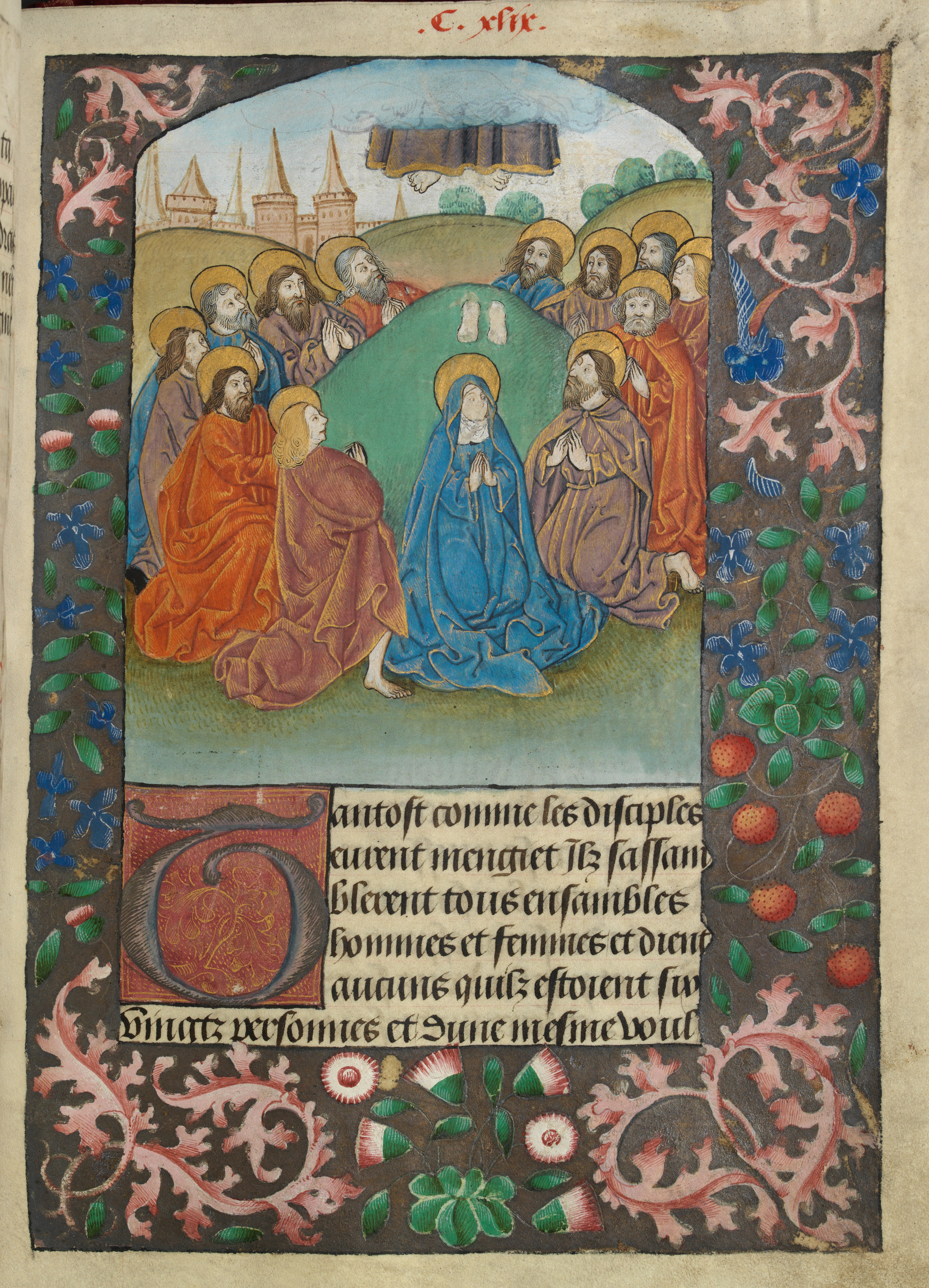
f. 148 Ascension

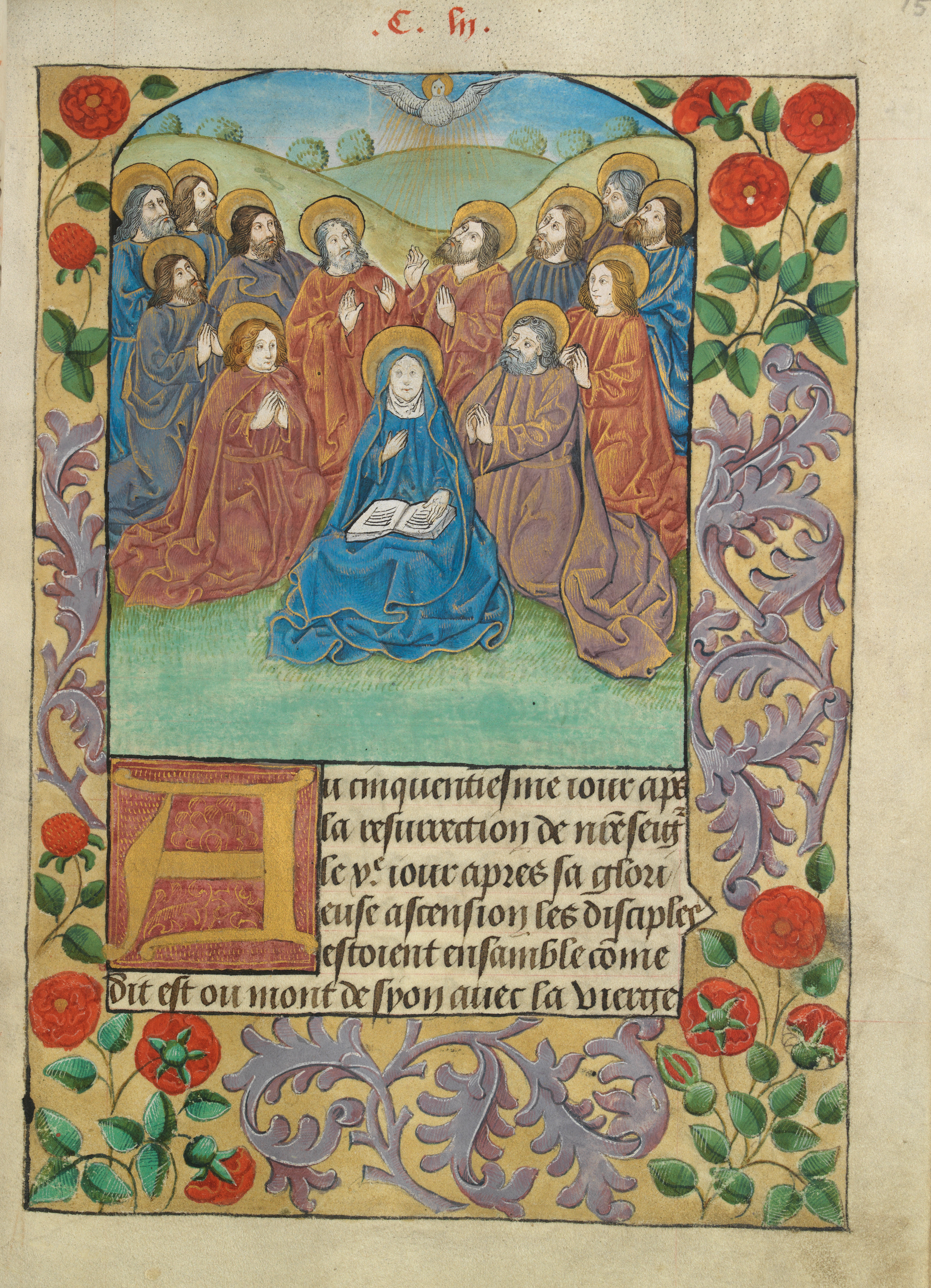
f. 151 Holy Ghost at Pentecost

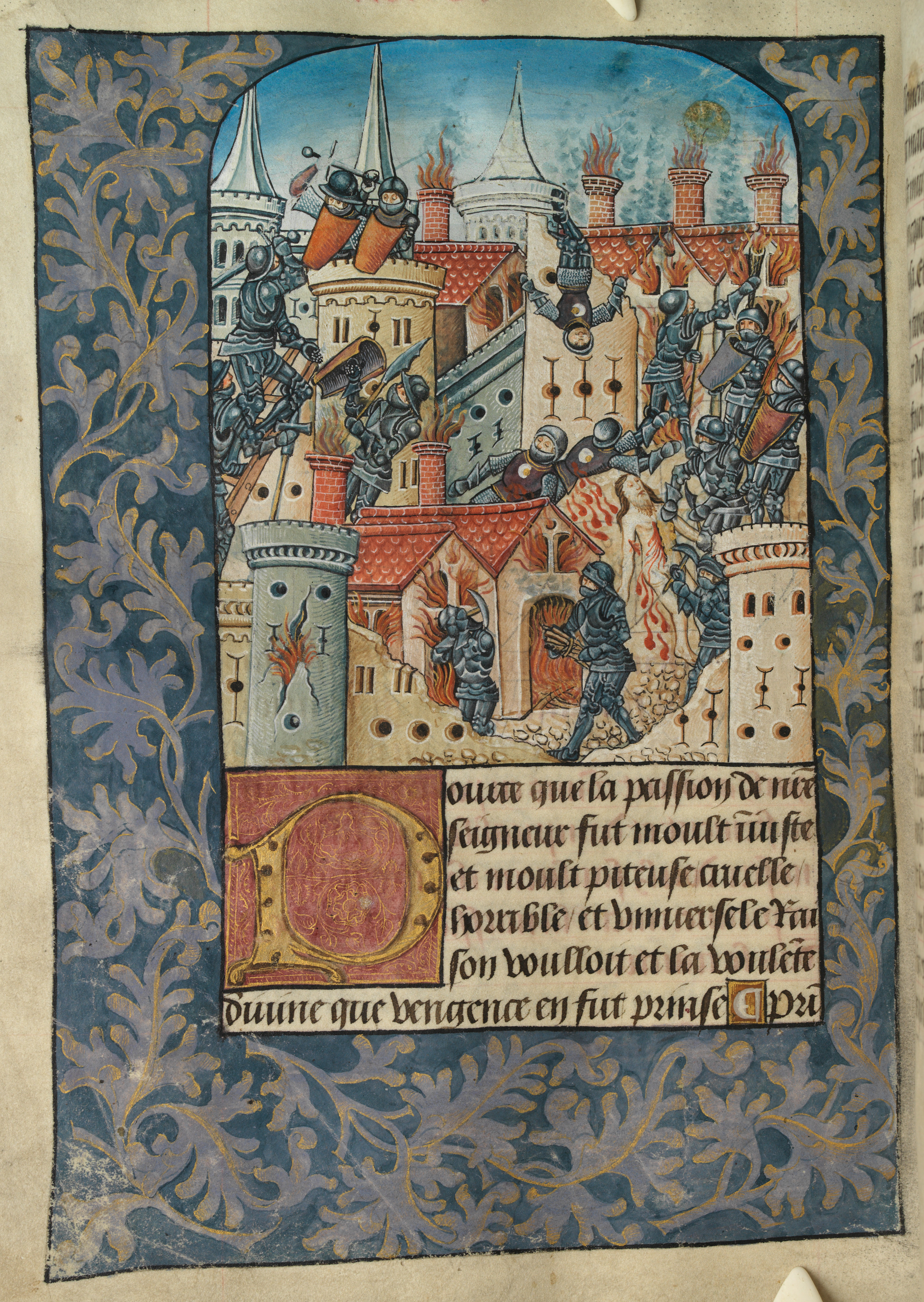
f. 155v Siege of Jerusalem

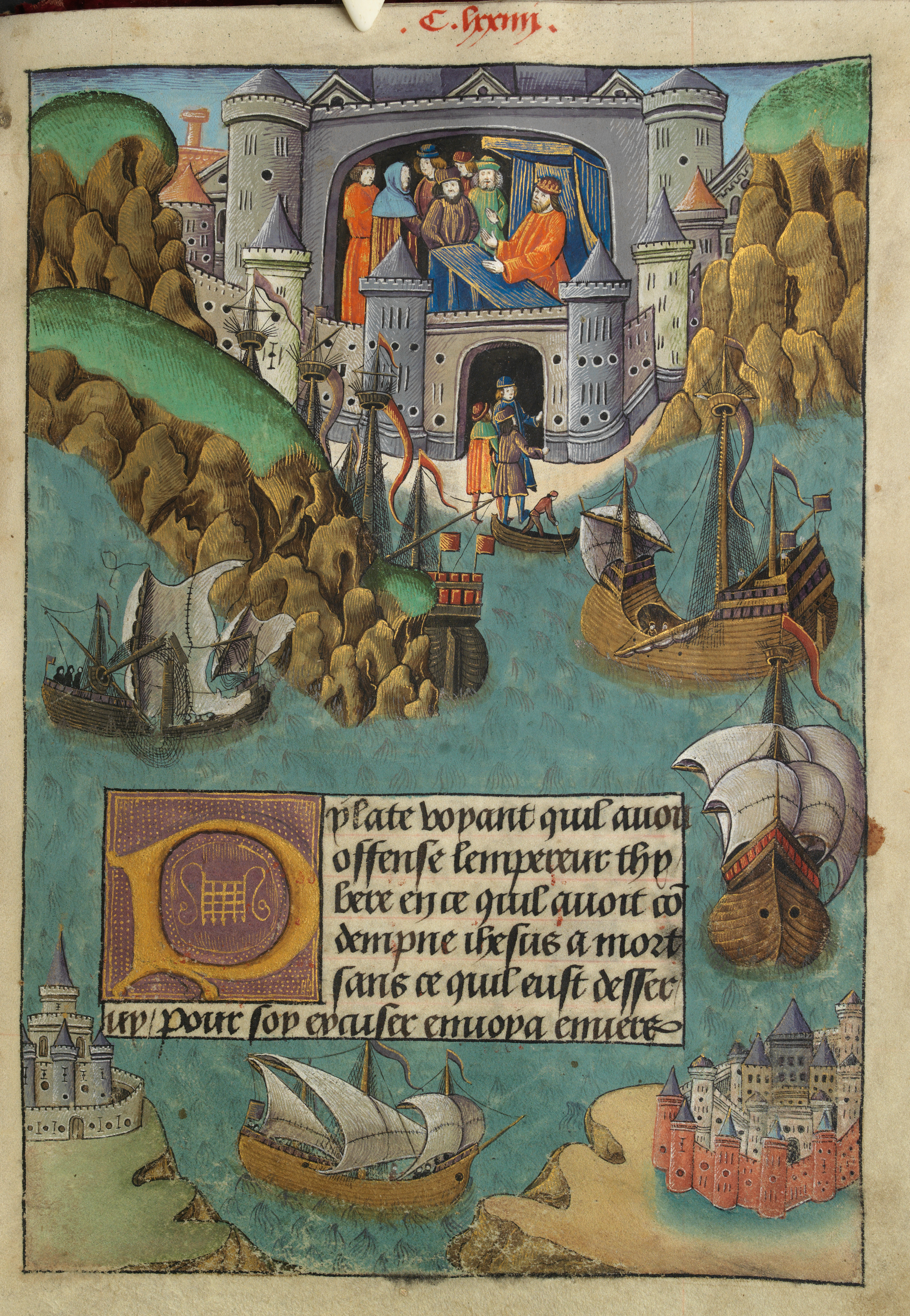
f. 172 Pilate and Albanus

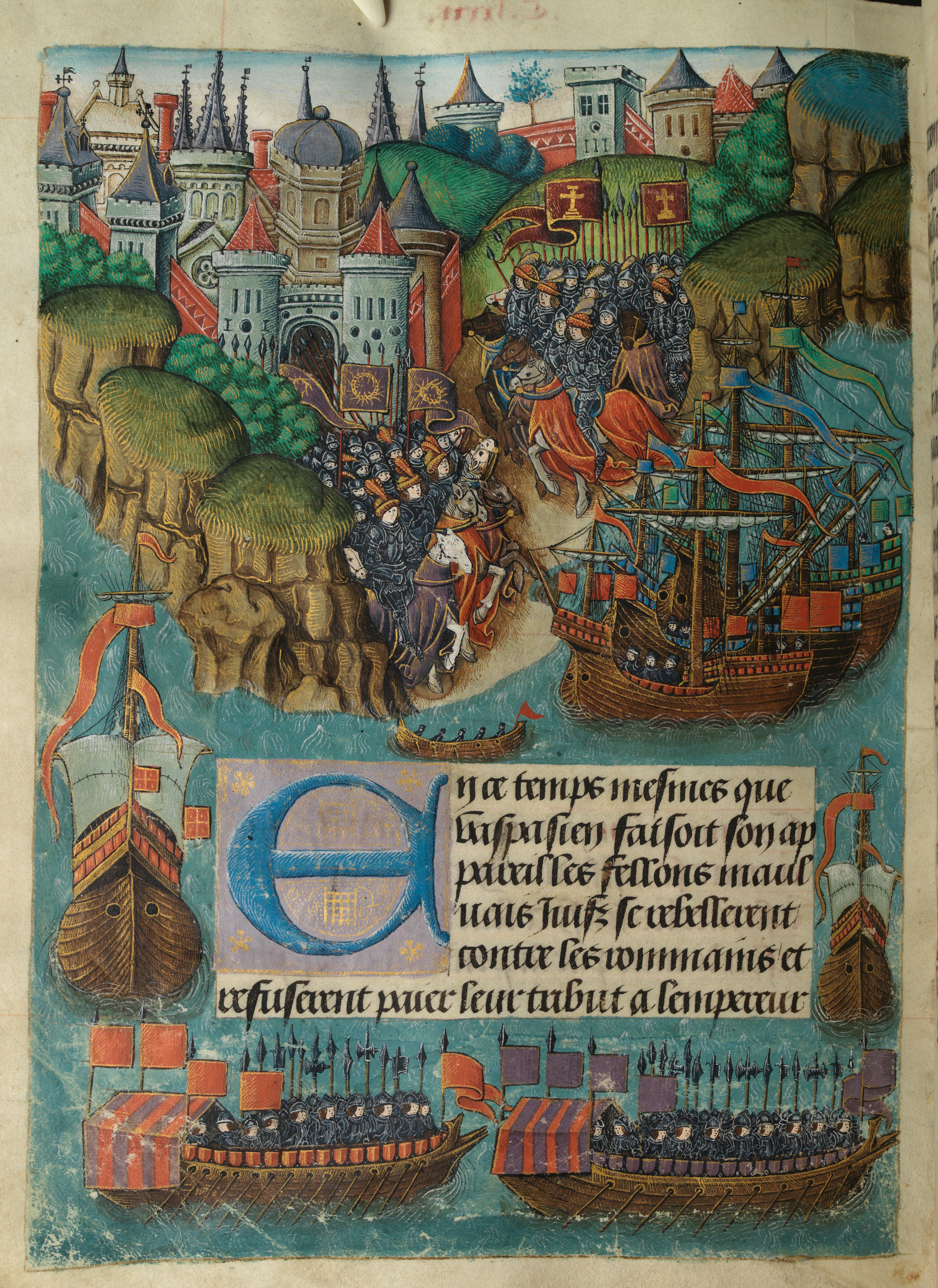
f. 177v Caesar and Vespasian

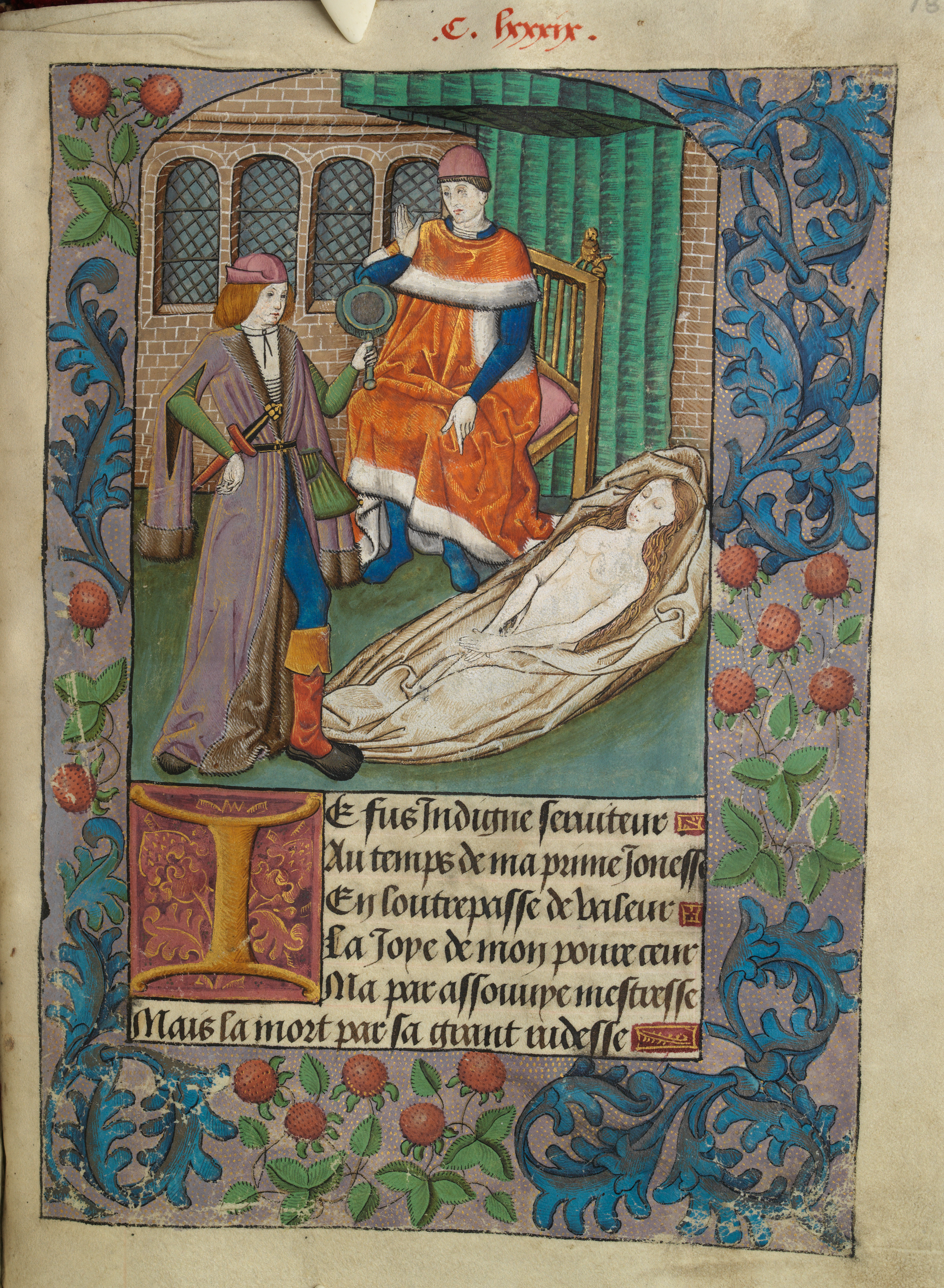
f. 186 Le Miroir de la Mort, frontispiece

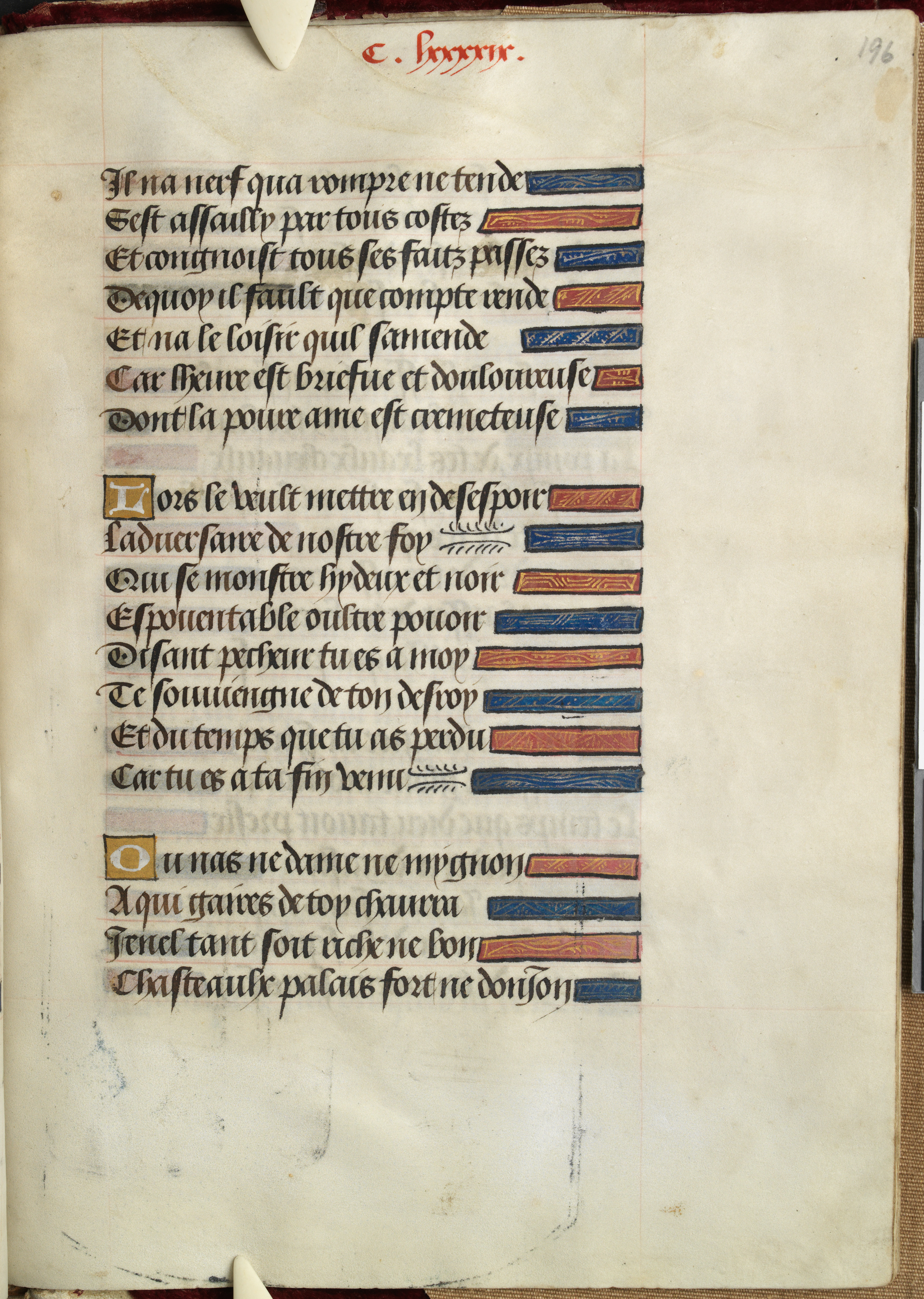
f. 196r Illuminated page
