= Harrowing of Hell =

Christ's triumphant descent into the underworld

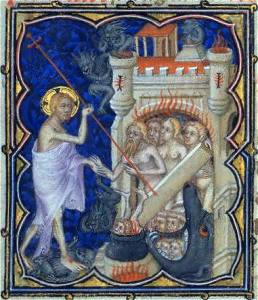
The Harrowing of Hell, Petites Heures, 14th-century illuminated manuscript commissioned by John, Duke of Berry

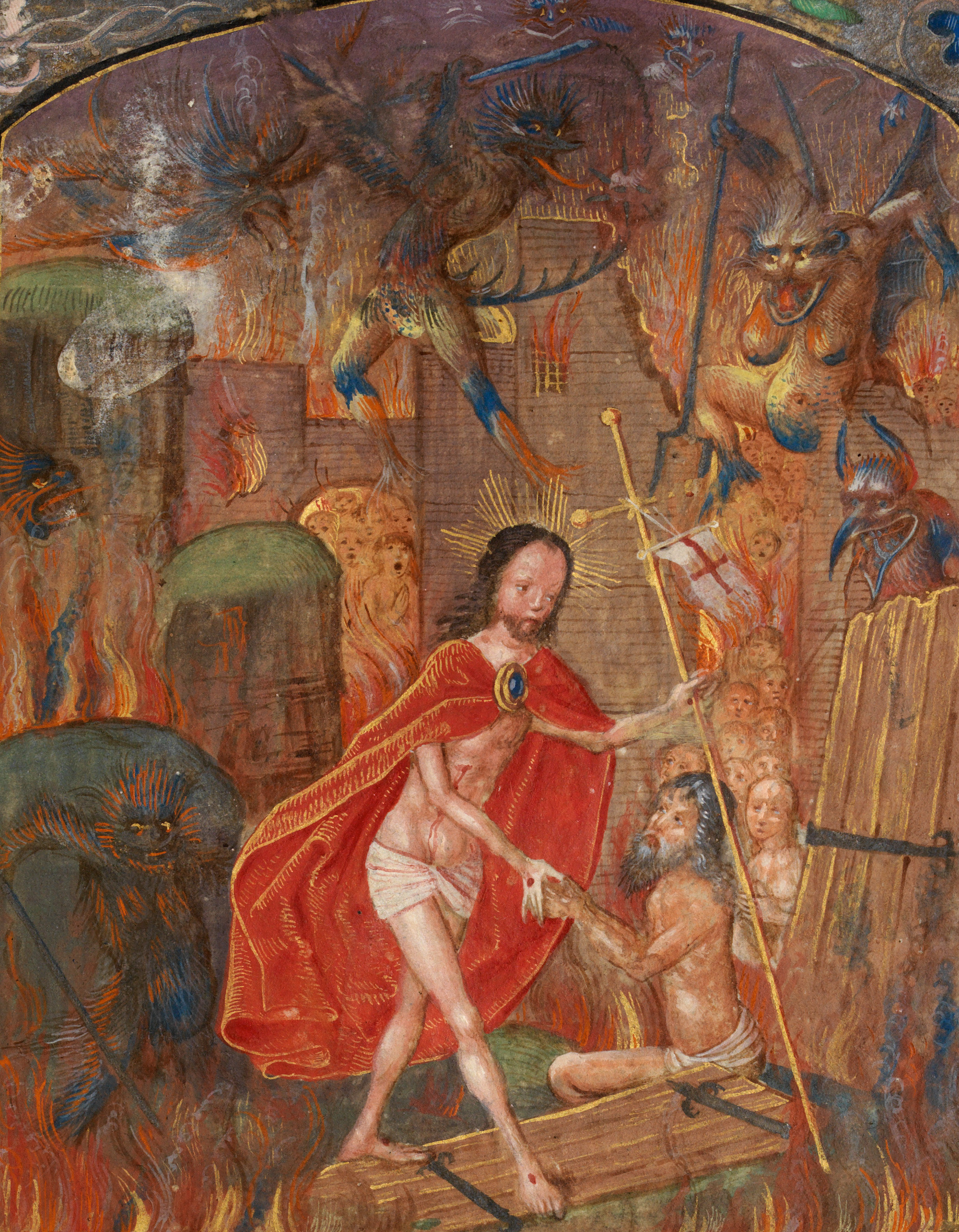
Christ leading Adam by the hand, depicted in the Vaux Passional, c. 1504

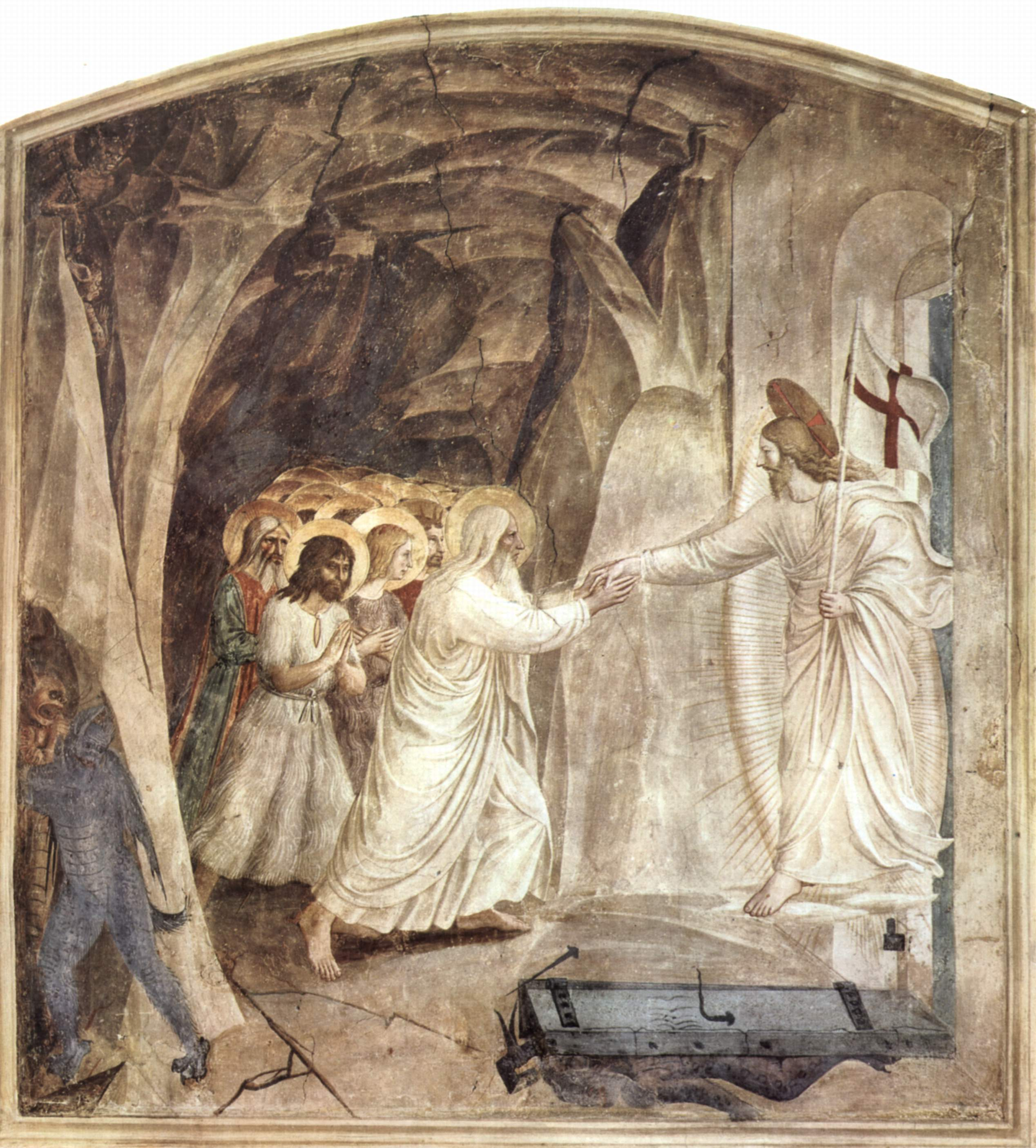
Before his resurrection from the dead, Jesus Christ grants salvation to souls by the Harrowing of Hell. Fresco, by Fra Angelico, c. 1430s.

In Christian theology, the Harrowing of Hell (Latin: Descensus Christi ad Inferos; Ancient Greek: Ἡ εἰς ᾍδου κάθοδος τοῦ Χριστοῦ – "the descent of Christ into Hell" or "Hades") (Note: Note that the Latin word is inferos "those below", not infernos "those of the lower regions". Neither word relates to fire; the use in English and other languages of "inferno" to mean "large fire" is modern and figurative, literally "hellish".) is the period of time between the Crucifixion of Jesus and his resurrection. In triumphant descent, Christ brought salvation to the souls held captive there since the beginning of the world.

Christ's descent into the world of the dead is referred to in the Apostles' Creed and the Athanasian Creed (Quicumque vult), which state that he "descended into the underworld" (descendit ad inferos), although neither mention that he liberated the dead. His descent to the underworld is alluded to in the New Testament in 1 Peter 4:6, which states that the "good tidings were proclaimed to the dead". The Catechism of the Catholic Church notes Ephesians 4:9, which states that "[Christ] descended into the lower parts of the earth", as also supporting this interpretation. These passages in the New Testament have given rise to differing interpretations. The Harrowing of Hell is commemorated in the liturgical calendar on Holy Saturday.

According to The Catholic Encyclopedia, the story first appears clearly in the Gospel of Nicodemus in the section called the Acts of Pilate, which also appears separately at earlier dates within the Acts of Peter and Paul. The descent into Hell had been related in Old English poems (e.g. Christ and Satan) connected with the names of Cædmon and Cynewulf. It is subsequently repeated in Ælfric of Eynsham's homilies c. 1000 AD, containing the first known inclusion of the word harrowing. Middle English dramatic literature contains the fullest and most dramatic development of the subject.

As a subject in Christian art, it is also known as the Anastasis (Greek for "resurrection"), considered a creation of Byzantine culture and first appearing in the West in the early 8th century.

== Background ==
The Old Testament view of the afterlife was that all people when they died, whether righteous or unrighteous, went to Sheol, a dark, still place. Several works from the Second Temple period elaborate the concept of Sheol, dividing it into sections based on the righteousness or unrighteousness of those who have died.

The New Testament maintains a distinction between Sheol, the common "place of the dead", and the eternal destiny of those condemned at the Final Judgment, variously described as Gehenna, "the outer darkness", or a lake of eternal fire.

== Terminology ==
The Greek wording in the Apostles' Creed is κατελθόντα εἰς τὰ κατώτατα (katelthonta eis ta katōtata), and in Latin is descendit ad inferos. The Greek τὰ κατώτατα (ta katōtata, 'the lowest') and the Latin inferos ('those below') may also be translated as "underworld", "netherworld", or "abode of the dead".

The realm into which Jesus descended is called Hell, in long-established English usage, but is also called Sheol or Limbo by some Christian theologians to distinguish it from the Hell of the damned. In Classical mythology, Hades is the underworld inhabited by departed souls, and the god Pluto is its ruler. Some New Testament translations use the term "Hades" to refer to the abode or state of the dead to represent a neutral place where the dead awaited the death, burial, and resurrection of Jesus.

The word harrow originally comes from the Old English hergian 'to harry or despoil', and is seen in the homilies of Ælfric of Eynsham, c. 1000. (Note: Harrow is a by-form of harry, a military term meaning to "make predatory raids or incursions".) The term Harrowing of Hell refers not merely to the idea that Jesus descended into Hell, as in the Creed, but to the rich tradition that developed later, asserting that he triumphed over inferos, releasing Hell's captives, particularly Adam and Eve, and the righteous men and women of the Old Testament period.

== Scripture ==
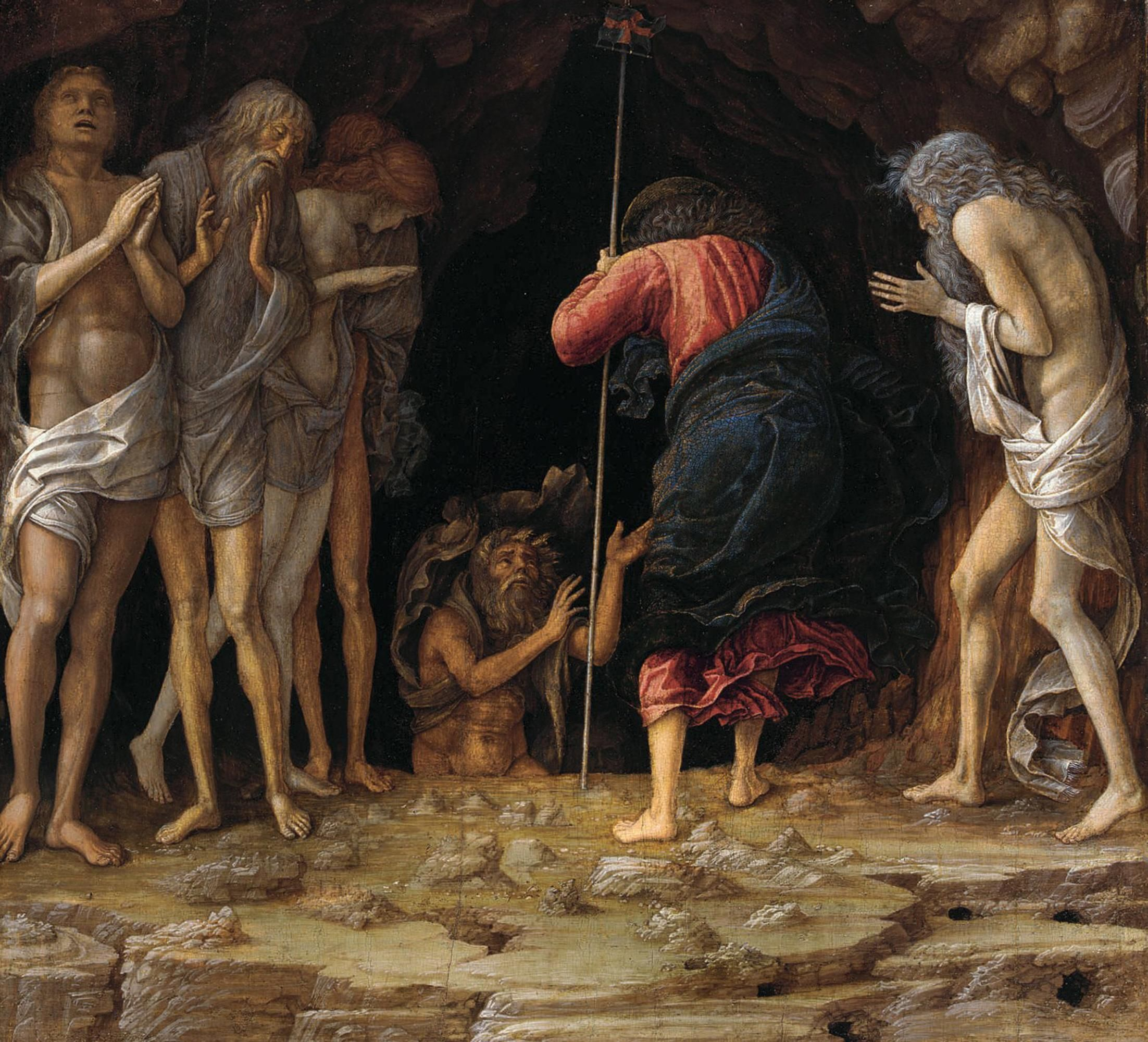
Christ's Descent into Limbo by Andrea Mantegna and studio, c. 1470

The Harrowing of Hell is mentioned or suggested by several verses in the New Testament: (Note: The following quotes are taken from the New Revised Standard Version.)

- Matthew 12:40: "For just as Jonah was three days and three nights in the belly of the sea monster, so for three days and three nights the Son of Man will be in the heart of the earth."
- Matthew 27:50–54: "And Jesus cried out again with a loud voice, and yielded up His spirit. Then, behold, the veil of the temple was torn in two from top to bottom; and the earth quaked, and the rocks were split, and the graves were opened; and many bodies of the saints who had fallen asleep were raised; and coming out of the graves after His resurrection, they went into the holy city and appeared to many. So when the centurion and those with him, who were guarding Jesus, saw the earthquake and the things that had happened, they feared greatly, saying, 'Truly this was the Son of God!'"
- Acts 2:24: "But God raised him up, having freed him from death, because it was impossible for him to be held in its power."
- Acts 2:31: "Foreseeing this, David spoke of the resurrection of the Messiah, saying, 'He was not abandoned to Hades, nor did his flesh experience corruption'."
- Ephesians 4:8-9: " When he ascended on high, he took many captives and gave gifts to his people. In saying, 'he ascended', what does it mean but that he had also descended into the lower regions, the earth?"
- Colossians 1:18: "He is the head of the body, the church; he is the beginning, the firstborn from the dead, so that he might come to have first place in everything."
- 1 Peter 3:18–19: "For Christ also suffered for sins once for all, the righteous for the unrighteous, in order to bring you to God. He was put to death in the flesh, but made alive in the spirit, in which also he went and made a proclamation to the spirits in prison, ..."
- 1 Peter 4:6: "For this is the reason the gospel was proclaimed even to the dead, so that, though they had been judged in the flesh as everyone is judged, they might live in the spirit as God does."

Theologian Hans Urs von Balthasar sees parallels with Mark 3:24: "If a kingdom is divided against itself, that kingdom cannot stand. And if a house is divided against itself, that house will not be able to stand. And if Satan has risen up against himself and is divided, he cannot stand, but his end has come. But no one can enter a strong man’s house and plunder his property without first tying up the strong man; then indeed the house can be plundered."

== Early Christian teaching ==
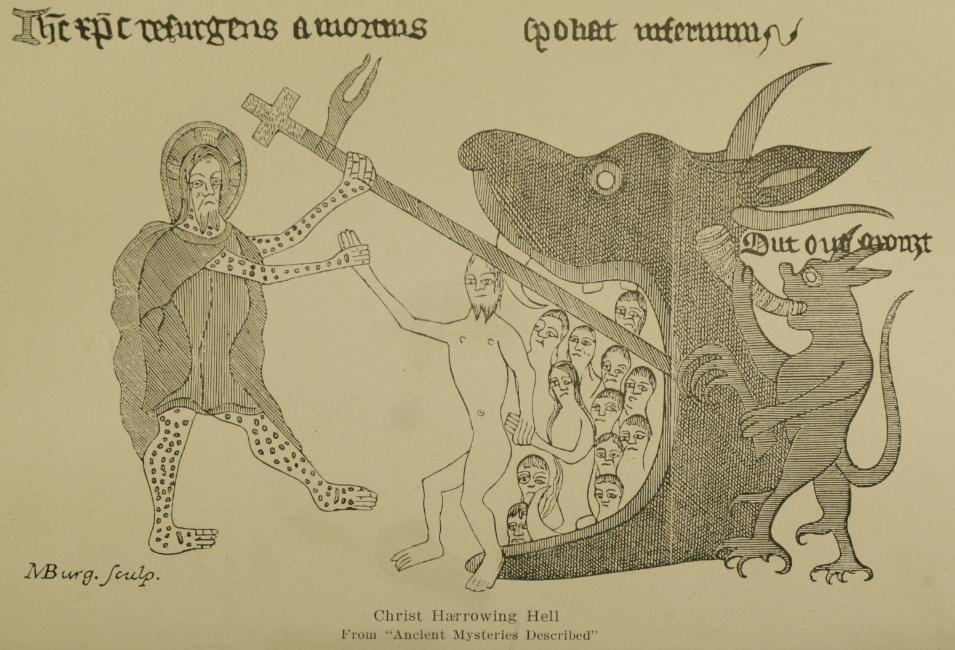
Descent into Hell, with Hellmouth, engraving by Michael Burghers (1647/48–1727)

The Harrowing of Hell was taught by theologians of the early church: St Melito of Sardis (died c. 180) in his Homily on the Passover and more explicitly in his Homily for Holy Saturday, Tertullian (A Treatise on the Soul, 55, though he himself disagrees with the idea), Hippolytus (Treatise on Christ and Anti-Christ), Origen (Against Celsus, 2:43), and, later, Ambrose (died 397) all wrote of the Harrowing of Hell. The early heretic Marcion and his followers also discussed the Harrowing of Hell, as mentioned by Tertullian, Irenaeus, and Epiphanius. The 6th-century sect called the Christolytes, as recorded by John of Damascus, believed that Jesus left his soul and body in Hell, and only rose with his divinity to Heaven.

The Gospel of Matthew relates that immediately after Christ died, the earth shook, there was darkness, the veil in the Second Temple was torn in two, and many people rose from the dead, and after the resurrection (Matthew 27:53) walked about in Jerusalem and were seen by many people there. Balthasar says this is a "visionary and imaginistic" description of Jesus vanquishing death itself.

According to the apocryphal Gospel of Nicodemus, the Harrowing of Hell was foreshadowed by Christ's raising of Lazarus from the dead prior to his own crucifixion.

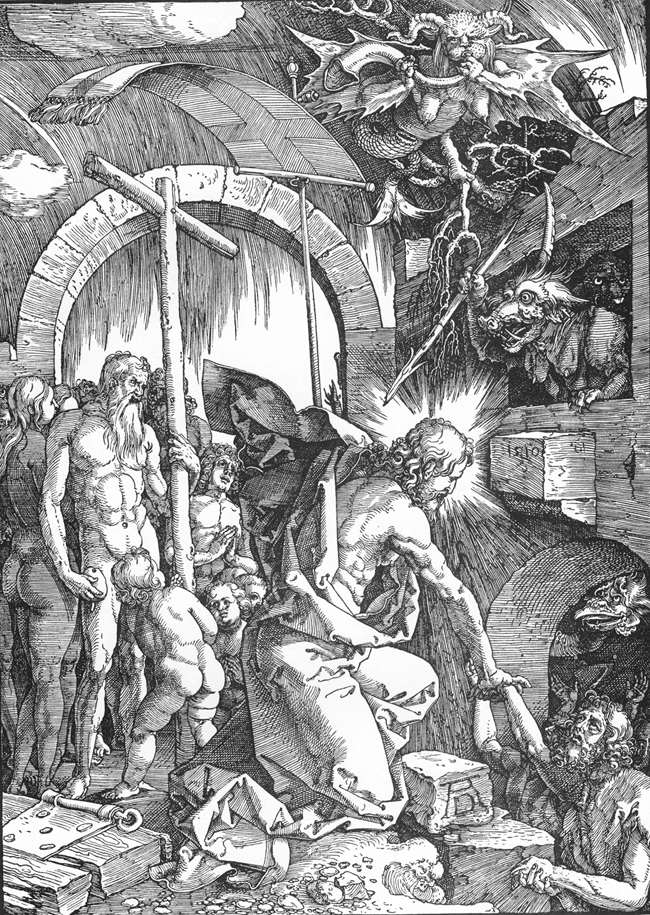
Christ's Descent into Limbo, woodcut by Albrecht Dürer, c. 1510

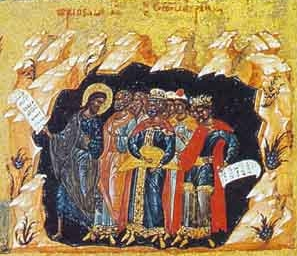
Russian icon of John the Baptist foretelling the descent of Christ to the righteous in Hades (17th century, Solovetsky Monastery)

In the Acts of Pilate—usually incorporated with the widely-read medieval Gospel of Nicodemus—texts built around an original that might have been as old as the 3rd century AD with many improvements and embroidered interpolations, chapters 17 to 27 are called the Decensus Christi ad Inferos. They contain a dramatic dialogue between Hades and Prince Satan, and the entry of the King of Glory, imagined as from within Tartarus.

== Interpretations of the doctrine ==
=== Orthodoxy ===
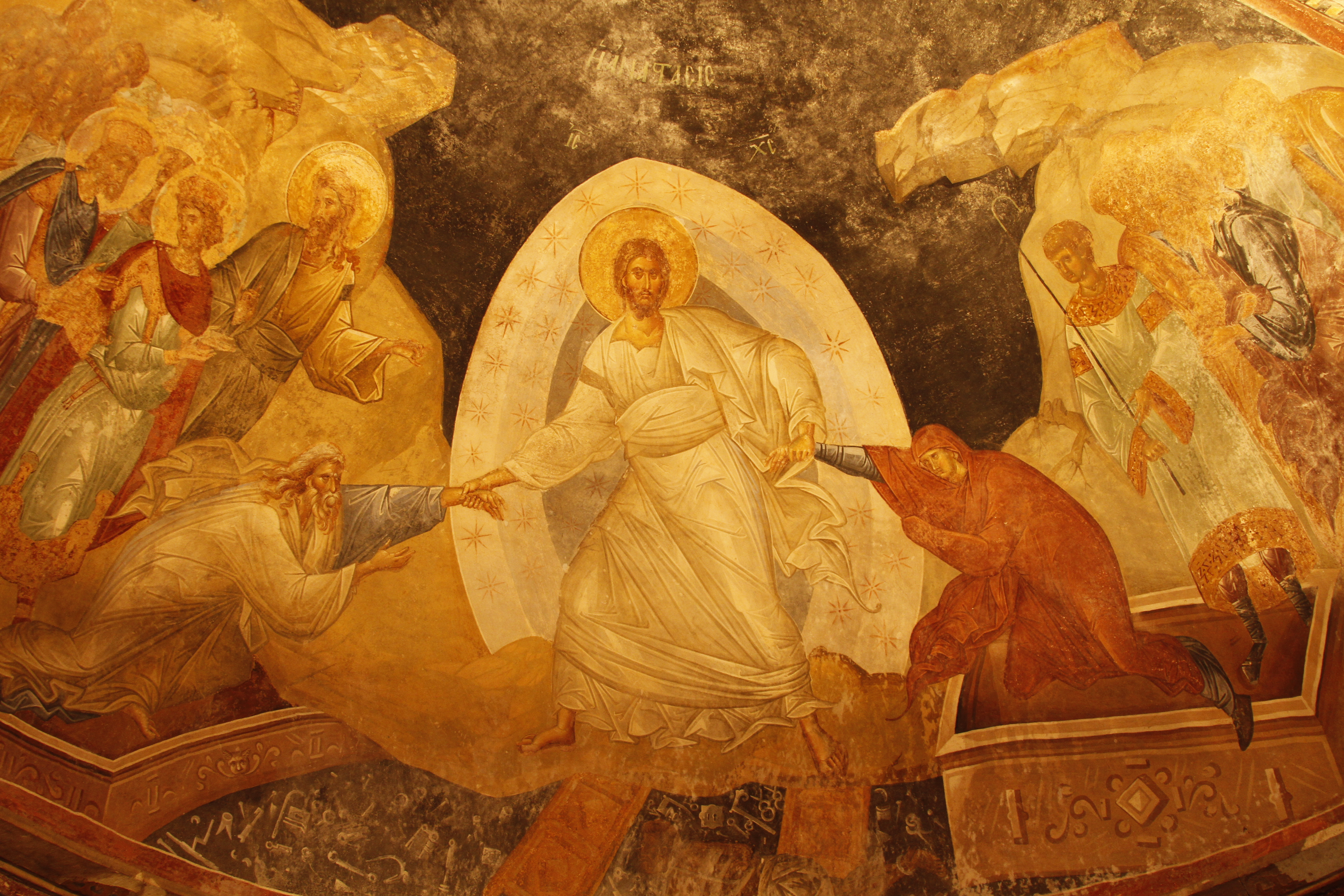
In Harrowing of Hades, fresco in the parecclesion of the Chora Church, Istanbul, c. 1315, raising Adam and Eve is depicted as part of the Resurrection icon, as it always is in the East.

John Chrysostom's Paschal Homily also addresses the Harrowing of Hades, and is typically read during the Paschal Vigil, the climactic service of the Orthodox celebration of Pascha (Easter).

In the Eastern Orthodox Church, the Harrowing of Hades is celebrated annually on Holy and Great Saturday during the Vesperal Divine Liturgy of Saint Basil, as is normative for the Byzantine Rite. At the beginning of the service, the hangings in the church and the vestments worn by the clergy are all somber Lenten colours (usually purple or black). Then, just before the Gospel reading, the liturgical colors are changed to white and the deacon performs a censing, and the priest strews laurel leaves around the church, symbolizing the broken gates of Hell; this is done in celebration of the harrowing of Hades then taking place, and in anticipation of Christ's imminent resurrection.

==== Icon ====
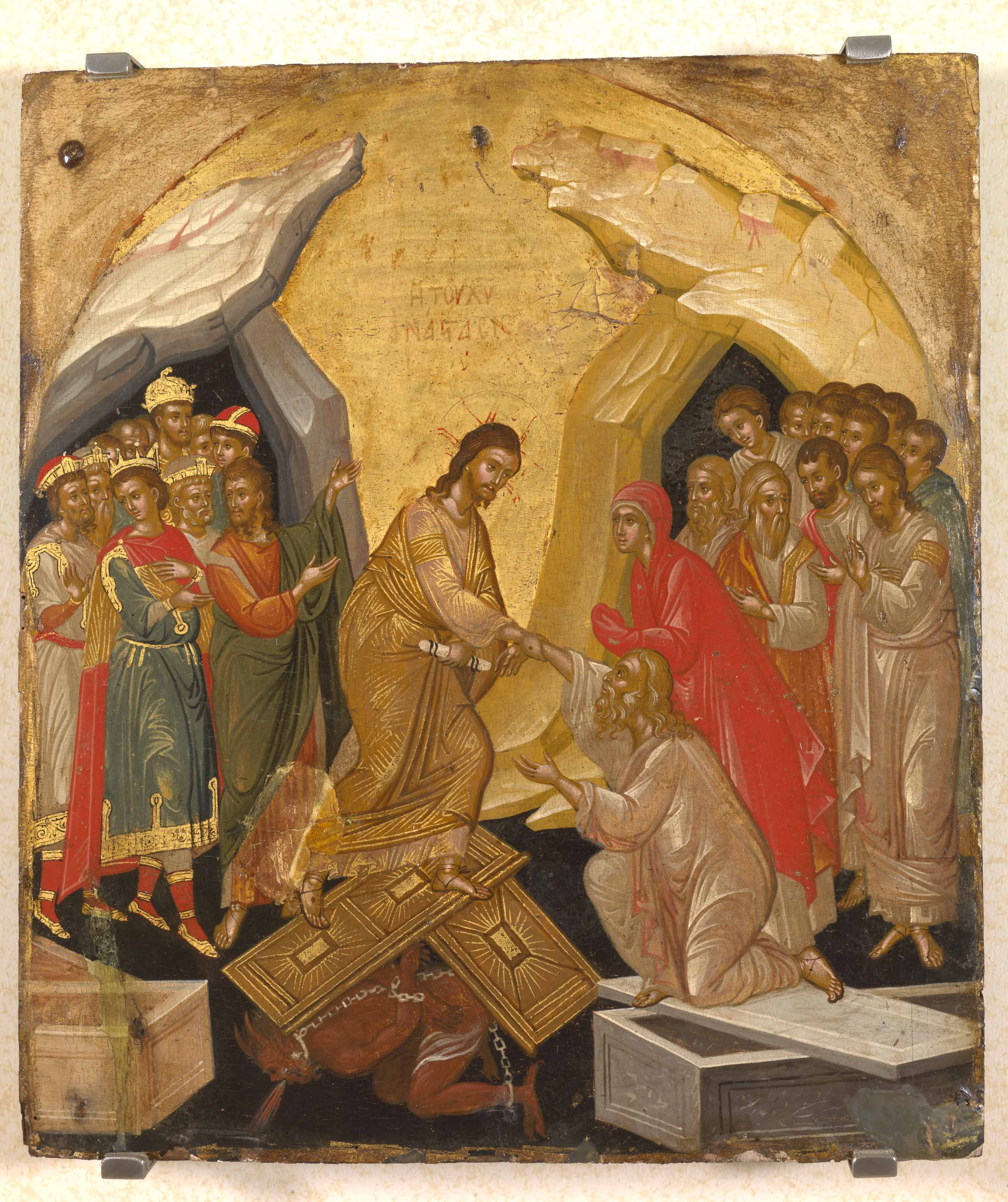
Harrowing of Hell by Markos Bathas 16th Century

The Harrowing of Hades is generally more common and prominent in Orthodox iconography compared to the Western tradition. It is the traditional icon for Holy Saturday, and is used during the Paschal season and on Sundays throughout the year.

The traditional Orthodox icon of the Resurrection of Jesus, partially inspired by the apocryphal Acts of Pilate (4th c.), does not depict simply the physical act of Christ coming out of the Tomb, but rather it reveals what Orthodox Christians believe to be the spiritual reality of what his Death and Resurrection accomplished. The icon depicts Jesus, vested in white and gold to symbolize his divine majesty, standing on the brazen gates of Hades (also called the "Doors of Death"), which are broken and have fallen in the form of a cross, illustrating the belief that by his death on the cross, Jesus "trampled down death by death" (see Paschal troparion). He is holding Adam and Eve and pulling them up out of Hades. Traditionally, he is not shown holding them by the hands but by their wrists, to illustrate the theological teaching that mankind could not pull himself out of his Original sin, but that it could come about only by the work (energia) of God. Jesus is surrounded by various righteous figures from the Old Testament (Abraham, David, etc.); the bottom of the icon depicts Hades as a chasm of darkness, often with various pieces of broken locks and chains strewn about. Quite frequently, one or two figures are shown in the darkness, bound in chains, who are generally identified as personifications of Death or the devil.

=== Catholicism ===
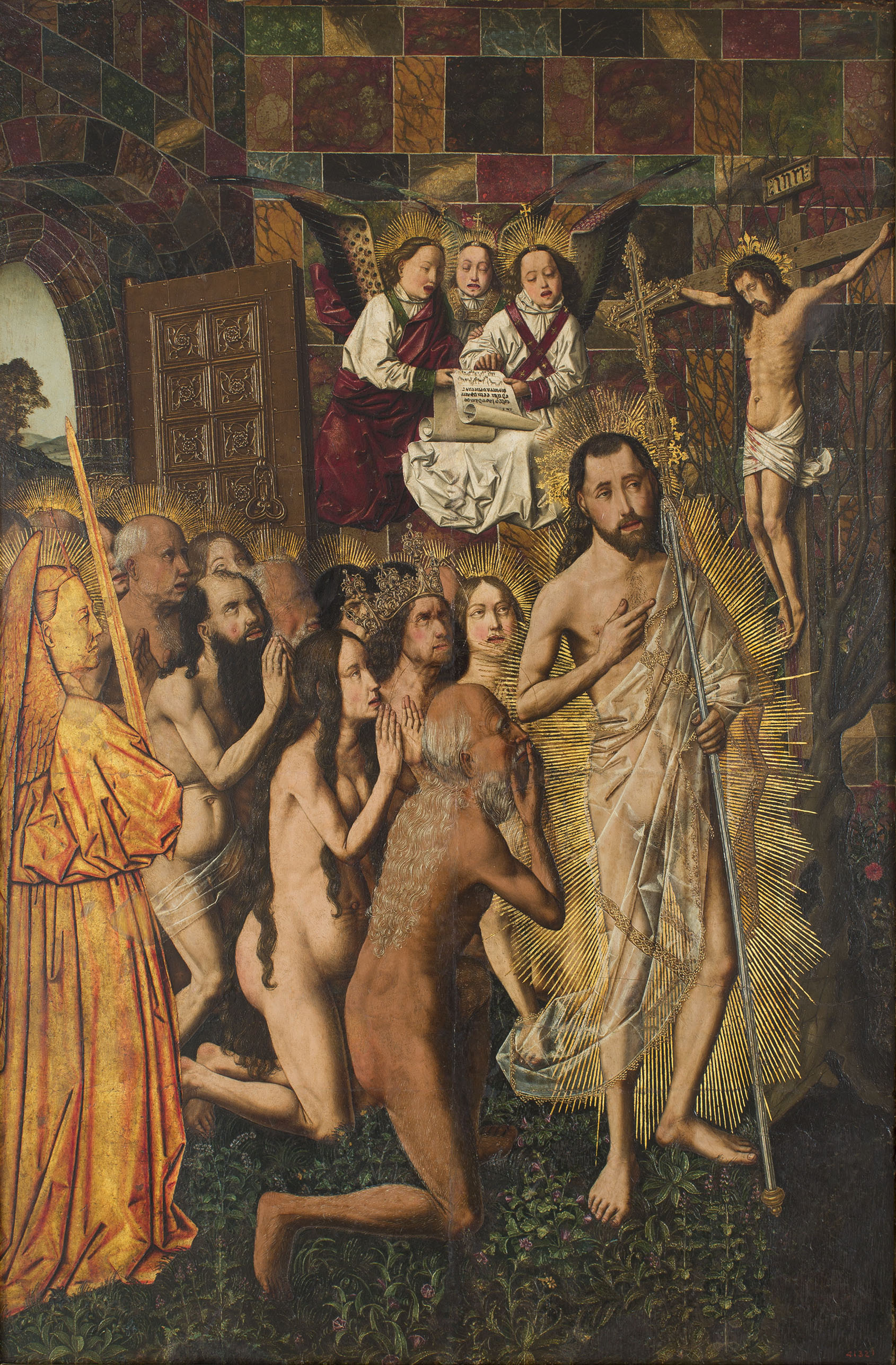
Christ leads the patriarchs from Hell to Paradise, by Bartolomeo Bertejo, Spanish, c. 1480: Methuselah, Solomon and the Queen of Sheba, and Adam and Eve lead the procession of the righteous behind Christ.

There is an ancient homily on the subject, of unknown authorship, usually entitled The Lord's Descent into Hell that is the second reading at the Office of Readings on Holy Saturday in the Roman Catholic Church.

The Catechism of the Catholic Church states: "By the expression 'He descended into Hell', the Apostles' Creed confesses that Jesus did really die and through his death for us conquered death and the devil 'who has the power of death' (Hebrews 2:14). In his human soul united to his divine person, the dead Christ went down to the realm of the dead. He opened Heaven's gates for the just who had gone before him."

As the Catechism says, the word "Hell"—from the Norse, Hel; in Latin, infernus, infernum, inferni; in Greek, ᾍδης (Hades); in Hebrew, שאול (Sheol)—is used in Scripture and the Apostles' Creed to refer to the abode of all the dead, whether righteous or evil, unless or until they are admitted to Heaven (CCC 633). This abode of the dead is the "Hell" into which the Creed says Christ descended. His death freed from exclusion from Heaven the just who had gone before him: "It is precisely these holy souls who awaited their Savior in Abraham's bosom whom Christ the Lord delivered when he descended into Hell", the Catechism states (CCC 633), echoing the words of the Roman Catechism, 1, 6, 3.

Conceptualization of the abode of the dead as a place, though possible and customary, is not obligatory (Church documents, such as catechisms, speak of a "state or place"). Some maintain that Christ did not go to the place of the damned, which is what is generally understood today by the word "Hell". For instance, Thomas Aquinas taught that Christ did not descend into the "Hell of the lost" in his essence, but only by the effect of his death, through which "he put them to shame for their unbelief and wickedness: but to them who were detained in Purgatory he gave hope of attaining to glory: while upon the holy Fathers detained in Hell solely on account of original sin, he shed the light of glory everlasting."

While some maintain that Christ merely descended into the "limbo of the fathers", others, notably theologian Hans Urs von Balthasar (inspired by the visions of Adrienne von Speyr), maintain that it was more than this and that the descent involved suffering by Jesus. Some maintain that this is a matter on which differences and theological speculation are permissible without transgressing the limits of orthodoxy.

=== Lutheranism ===
Martin Luther, in a sermon delivered in Torgau in 1533, stated that Christ descended into Hell.

The Formula of Concord (a Lutheran confession) states, "we believe simply that the entire person, God and human being, descended to Hell after his burial, conquered the devil, destroyed the power of Hell, and took from the devil all his power" (Solid Declaration, Art. IX).

Many attempts were made following Luther's death to systematize his theology of the descensus, whether Christ descended in victory or humiliation. For Luther, however, the defeat or "humiliation" of Christ is never fully separable from His victorious glorification. Luther himself, when pressed to elaborate on the question of whether Christ descended to Hell in humiliation or victory responded, "It is enough to preach the article to the laypeople as they have learned to know it in the past from the stained glass and other sources."

=== Anglicanism ===
"Anglican orthodoxy, without protest, has allowed high authorities to teach that there is an intermediate state, Hades, including both Gehenna and Paradise, but with an impassable gulf between the two." The traditional language of the Apostles' Creed affirms that Jesus "descended into hell"; the contemporary language rite of the Book of Common Prayer (1979) says that Jesus "descended to the dead" (BCP, pp. 53, 96).

=== Calvinism ===
John Calvin expressed his concern that many Christians "have never earnestly considered what it is or means that we have been redeemed from God's judgment. Yet this is our wisdom: duly to feel how much our salvation cost the Son of God."

Calvin's conclusion is that "If any persons have scruples about admitting this article into the Creed, it will soon be made plain how important it is to the sum of our redemption: if it is left out, much of the benefit of Christ’s death will be lost." Calvin strongly opposed the notion that Christ freed prisoners, as opposed to traveling to Hell as part of completing his sufferings.

The Reformed interpret the phrase "he descended into Hell" as referring to Christ's pain and humiliation prior to his death, and that this humiliation had a spiritual dimension as part of God's judgement upon the sin which he bore on behalf of Christians. The doctrine of Christ's humiliation is also meant to assure believers that Christ has redeemed them from the pain and suffering of God's judgment on sin.

=== The Church of Jesus Christ of Latter-day Saints ===
The Harrowing of Hell has been a unique and important doctrine among members of the Church of Jesus Christ of Latter-day Saints since its founding in 1830 by Joseph Smith, although members of the church usually call it by other terms, such as "Christ's visit to the spirit world". Like Christian exegetes distinguishing between Sheol and Gehenna, Latter-day Saints distinguish between the realm of departed spirits (the "spirit world") and the portion (or state) of the wicked ("spirit prison"). The portion or state of the righteous is often referred to as "paradise".

Perhaps the most notable aspect of Latter-day Saint beliefs regarding the Harrowing of Hell is their view on the purpose of it, both for the just and the wicked. Joseph F. Smith, the sixth president of the Church, explained in what is now a canonized revelation, that when Christ died, "there were gathered together in one place an innumerable company of the spirits of the just, ... rejoicing together because the day of their deliverance was at hand. They were assembled awaiting the advent of the Son of God into the spirit world, to declare their redemption from the bands of death."

In the Latter-day Saint view, while Christ announced freedom from physical death to the just, he had another purpose in descending to Hell regarding the wicked. "The Lord went not in person among the wicked and the disobedient who had rejected the truth, to teach them; but behold, from among the righteous, he organized his forces ... and commissioned them to go forth and carry the light of the gospel to them that were in darkness, even to all the spirits of men; and thus was the gospel preached to the dead, ... to those who had died in their sins, without a knowledge of the truth, or in transgression, having rejected the prophets." From the Latter-day Saint viewpoint, the rescue of spirits was not a one-time event but an ongoing process that still continues. This concept goes hand-in-hand with the doctrine of baptism for the dead, which is based on the Latter-day Saint belief that those who choose to accept the gospel in the spirit world must still receive the saving ordinances in order to dwell in the kingdom of God. These baptisms and other ordinances are performed in Latter-day Saint temples, wherein a church member is baptized vicariously, or in behalf of, those who died without being baptized by proper authority. The recipients in the spirit world then have the opportunity to accept or reject this baptism.

== Rejection of the doctrine ==
Although the Harrowing of Hell is taught by the Lutheran, Catholic, Reformed, and Orthodox traditions, a number of Christians reject the doctrine of the "harrowing of hell", claiming that "there is scant scriptural evidence for [it], and that Jesus's own words contradict it." John Piper, for example, says "there is no textual [i.e. Biblical] basis for believing that Christ descended into hell", and, therefore, Piper does not recite the "he descended into hell" phrase when saying the Apostles' Creed. Wayne Grudem also skips the phrase when reciting the Creed; he says that the "single argument in ... favor [of the "harrowing of hell" clause in the Creed] seems to be that it has been around so long. ... But an old mistake is still a mistake." In his book Raised with Christ, Pentecostal Adrian Warnock agrees with Grudem, commenting, "Despite some translations of an ancient creed [i.e. the Apostles' Creed], which suggest that Jesus ... 'descended into hell', there is no biblical evidence to suggest that he actually did so."

Augustine, in his 99th epistle, confesses that this text is replete with difficulties. This he declares is clear, beyond all doubt, that Jesus Christ descended in soul after his death into the regions below, and concludes with these words: Quis ergo nisi infidelis negaverit fuisse apud inferos Christum? ("Who, then, but an unbeliever, has denied that Christ was in hell?") In this prison souls would not be detained unless they were indebted to divine justice, nor would salvation be preached to them unless they were in a state that was capable of receiving salvation.

=== Christian mortalism ===
The above views share the traditional Christian belief in the immortality of the soul. The mortalist view of the intermediate state requires an alternative view of the Acts 2:27 and Acts 2:31, taking a view of the New Testament use of Hell as equivalent to use of Hades in the Septuagint and therefore to Sheol in the Old Testament. William Tyndale and Martin Bucer of Strassburg argued that Hades in Acts 2 was merely a metaphor for the grave. Other reformers Christopher Carlisle and Walter Deloenus in London, argued for the article to be dropped from the creed. The Harrowing of Hell was a major scene in traditional depictions of Christ's life avoided by John Milton due to his mortalist views. Mortalist interpretations of the Acts 2 statements of Christ being in Hades are also found among later Anglicans such as E. W. Bullinger.

While those holding mortalist views on the soul would agree on the "harrowing of hell" concerning souls, that there were no conscious dead for Christ to literally visit, the question of whether Christ himself was also dead, unconscious, brings different answers:

- To most Protestant advocates of "soul sleep" such as Martin Luther, Christ himself was not in the same condition as the dead, and while his body was in Hades, Christ, as second person of the Trinity, was conscious in heaven.
- To Christian mortalists who are also non-Trinitarian, such as Socinians and Christadelphians, the maxim "the dead know nothing" includes also Christ during the three days.

Of the three days, Christ says "I was dead" (Greek egenomen nekros ἐγενόμην νεκρὸς, Latin fui mortuus).

== In culture ==
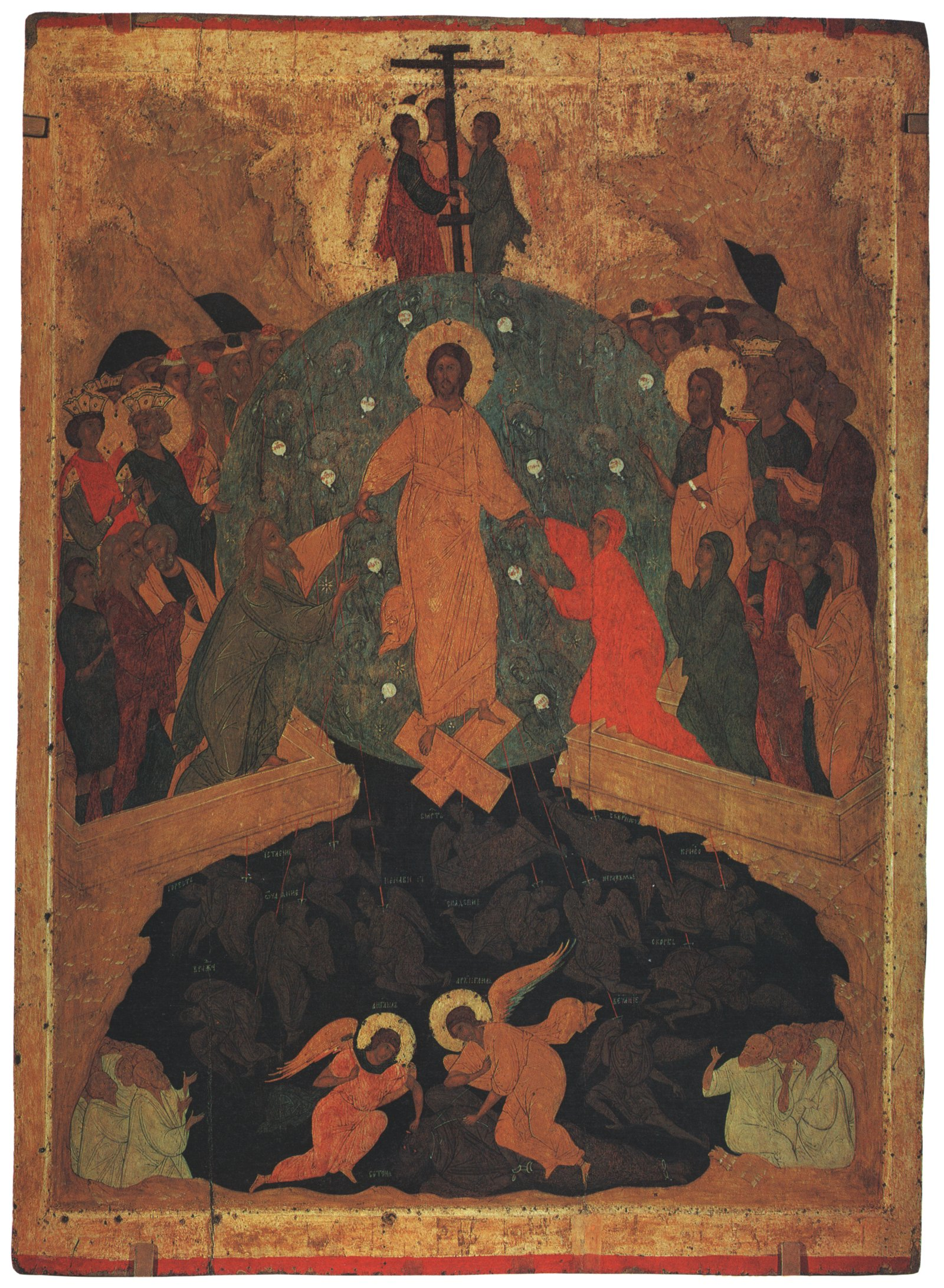
Harrowing of Hades, an icon by Dionisius, from the Ferapontov Monastery

=== Drama ===
The richest, most circumstantial accounts of the Harrowing of Hell are found in medieval dramatic literature, such as the four great cycles of English Mystery plays which each devote a separate scene to depict it. Christ was portrayed as conquering Satan, and then victoriously leading out Adam and Eve, the prophets, and the patriarchs. The earliest surviving Christian drama probably intended to be performed is the Harrowing of Hell found in the 8th-century Book of Cerne.

The subject is found also in the Cornish Mystery plays and the York and Wakefield cycles. These medieval versions of the story derive from scripture, but the details come from the Gospel of Nicodemus.

=== Literature ===
==== Middle Ages ====
In Dante's Inferno the Harrowing of Hell is mentioned in Canto IV by the pilgrim's guide Virgil. Virgil was in Limbo (the first circle of Hell) in the first place because he was not exposed to Christianity in his lifetime, and therefore he describes Christ in generic terms as a "mighty one" who rescued the Hebrew forefathers of Christianity, but left him and other virtuous pagans behind in the very same circle. It is clear that Virgil does not fully understand the significance of the event as Dante does.

The Book of Belial (c. 1382) by Jacobus de Teramo narrates a lawsuit between Lucifer and Jesus Christ, in which Jesus is accused of trespassing for having descended into Hell and liberated the souls of the damned.

An incomplete Middle English telling of the Harrowing of Hell is found in the Auchinleck manuscript.

A scene of the Harrowing of Hell is included by William Langland (Willielmus de Langland; circa 1330 – circa 1386) in Piers Plowman (circa 1377). This is a Middle English allegorical narrative poem, written in un-rhymed, alliterative verse divided into sections called passus (Latin for "step").

Although the Orfeo legend has its origin in pagan antiquity, the medieval romance of Sir Orfeo has often been interpreted as drawing parallels between the Greek hero and Jesus freeing souls from Hell, with the explication of Orpheus' descent and return from the Underworld as an allegory for Christ's as early as the Ovide Moralisé (1340).

==== Modern ====
The Catholic philologist and fantasy author J. R. R. Tolkien echoes the Harrowing of Hell theme in multiple places in The Silmarillion (1977) and The Lord of the Rings (1954–55). Identified instances include the tale "Of Beren and Lúthien" in which Beren is rescued from Sauron's dark dungeons, and Gandalf's freeing of King Théoden of Rohan from the dark insinuations of the traitorous Wormtongue.

In Stephen Lawhead's novel Byzantium (1997), a young Irish monk is asked to explain Jesus Christ's life to a group of Vikings, who were particularly impressed with his "descent to the underworld" (Helreið).

In 2021, Jonathan Jackson wrote “The Harrowing of Hell: An epic poem” about the descent of Jesus to Hell after the crucifixion. It was published by Hilasterion Publishing of Tennessee and illustrated by Anastasia Chybireva-Fender.

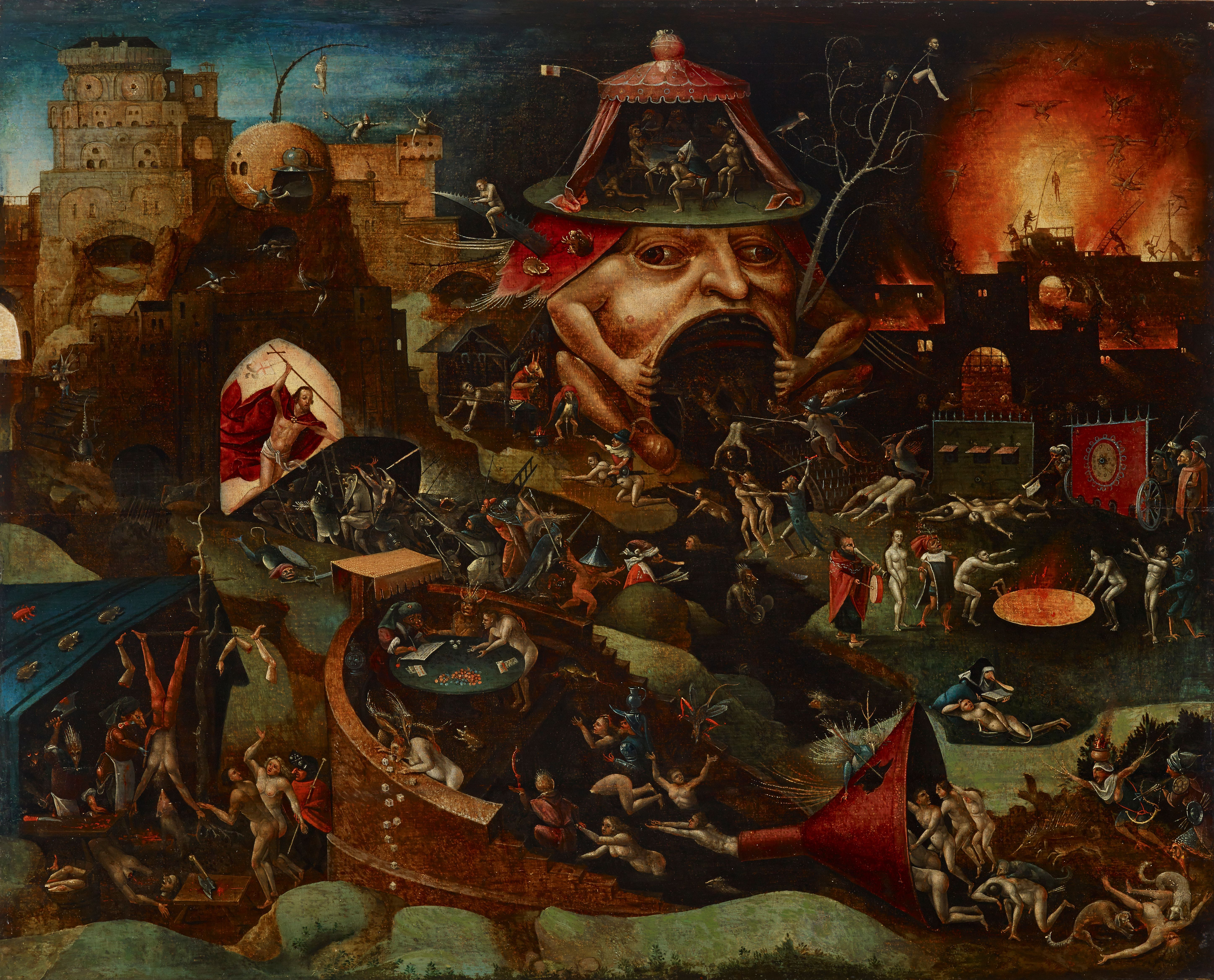
Christ in Limbo, by a follower of Hieronymus Bosch

Parallels in Jewish literature refer to legends of Enoch and Abraham's harrowings of the Underworld, unrelated to Christian themes. These have been updated in Isaac Leib Peretz's short story "Neilah in Gehenna", in which a Jewish hazzan descends to Hell and uses his unique voice to bring about the repentance and liberation of the souls imprisoned there.

=== Music ===
- The Harrowing of Hell is the subject of baroque oratorios including Salieri's Gesù al Limbo (1803) to a text by Luigi Prividali.

=== Art ===
- A follower of Hieronymus Bosch depicts Christ in Limbo in a vivid composition, now owned by the Indianapolis Museum of Art.

=== Television ===
- The harrowing is mentioned in the eponymous episode of the British dark comedy anthology series Inside No. 9.
- In Supernatural, the seraph Castiel is said to have earned the respect of other angels during the harrowing due to his military prowess.

== See also ==
- Adam: original sin, Resurrection of Jesus, and Adam's grave at Golgotha – theology behind Orthodox iconography
- Christian mythology

== Bibliography ==
- Trumbower, J. A., "Jesus' Descent to the Underworld", in Idem, Rescue for the Dead: The Posthumous Salvation of Non-Christians in Early Christianity (Oxford, 2001) (Oxford Studies in Historical Theology), 91–108.
- Brinkman, Martien E., "The Descent into Hell and the Phenomenon of Exorcism in the Early Church", in Jerald D. Gort, Henry Jansen and Hendrik M. Vroom (eds), Probing the Depths of Evil and Good: Multireligious Views and Case Studies (Amsterdam/New York, NY, 2007) (Currents of Encounter – Studies on the Contact between Christianity and Other Religions, Beliefs, and Cultures, 33).
- Alyssa Lyra Pitstick, Light in Darkness: Hans Urs von Balthasar and the Catholic Doctrine of Christ's Descent into Hell (Grand Rapids (MI), Eerdmanns, 2007).
- Gavin D'Costa, "Part IV: Christ’s Descent into Hell", in Idem, Christianity and World Religions: Disputed Questions in the Theology of Religions (Oxford, Wiley-Blackwell, 2009),
- Georgia Frank, "Christ’s Descent to the Underworld in Ancient Ritual and Legend", in Robert J. Daly (ed), Apocalyptic Thought in Early Christianity (Grand Rapids (MI), Baker Academic, 2009) (Holy Cross Studies in Patristic Theology and History), 211–226.
- Hilarion Alfayev, "Christ the Conqueror of Hell: The Descent into Hades from an Orthodox Perspective". St Vladimirs Seminary Pr (November 20, 2009)
