= Harrowing of Hell (drama) =

The Harrowing of Hell is an eighth-century Latin work in fifty-five lines found in the Anglo-Saxon Book of Cerne (folios 98v–99v). It is probably a Northumbrian work, written in prose and verse, where the former serves either as a set of stage directions for a dramatic portrayal or as a series of narrations for explaining the poetry.

Three voices appear in the work: those of Adam, Eve, and a narrator. The prose of the "narrator" appears in the Book of Cerne in red ink setting it off from the rest of the text. The prose portions are rhythmic and may therefore have been sung, even if they were primarily directorial. Besides the three main soloists, the work was designed for a full choir (antiqui iusti). The work may be either an early oratorio or the earliest surviving work of Christian drama intended to be performed.

The Harrowing of Hell has two sources: a lost Latin homily, which survives in translation as the seventh of the Old English Blickling Homilies, and a Roman psalter also in the Book of Cerne. David Dumville (1972) provides a critical edition of the Latin text and Dronke (1994) provides some English translation.

The fifty-five lines recount how Jesus Christ descended into hell to release the "prisoners", the just who were held by Satan. In typical medieval representations of this event, Adam and Eve are released immediately, but in the Harrowing of Hell they must wait and beg before they too are finally saved. The plea of Eve goes as follows:

Iustus est, domine, et rectum iudicium tuum, quia merito haec patior, nam ego, cum in honore essem, no intellexi ... Ne avertas faciem misericordiae tuae a me, et ne declines in ira ab ancilla tua!	You are just, Lord, and your judgement is unswerving, for I suffer this deservedly, since, when I was in honour, I did not understand ... Do not turn the face of your mercy away from me, do not, in anger, shun your handmaiden.

The work ends abruptly here, the rest apparently being lost, but if a comparable Old English work is any indication, Eve's plea is successful.
