= Humiliation =

Abasement of pride

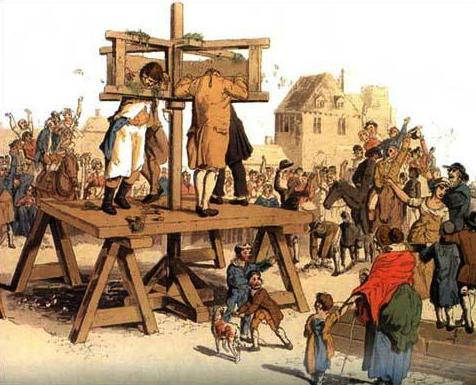
The Pillory, from The Costume of Great Britain (1805)

Humiliation is the abasement of pride, which creates mortification or leads to a state of being humbled or reduced to lowliness or submission. It is an emotion felt by a person whose social status, either by force or willingly, has just decreased. It can be brought about through intimidation, physical or mental mistreatment or trickery, or by embarrassment if a person is revealed to have committed a socially or legally unacceptable act. Whereas humility can be sought alone as a means to de-emphasize the ego, humiliation must involve other person(s), though not necessarily directly or willingly.

Humiliation is currently an active research topic, and is now seen as an important – and complex – core dynamic in human relationships, having implications at intrapersonal, interpersonal, institutional and international levels.

== Psychological effects ==
A person who suffers from severe humiliation could experience major depressions, suicidal states, and severe anxiety states such as post-traumatic stress disorder. The loss of status, like losing a job or being labeled as a liar or discredited unfairly, could cause people to be unable to behave normally in their communities. Humiliated individuals could be provoked and crave revenge, and some people could feel worthless, hopeless and helpless, creating suicidal thoughts if justice is not met. It also can lead to new insights, activism and a new kinship with marginalized groups.

Feelings of humiliation can produce 'humiliated fury', which when turned inward can result in apathy and depression, and when turned outward can give rise to paranoia, sadistic behavior and fantasies of revenge. Klein explains, "When it is outwardly directed, humiliated fury unfortunately creates additional victims, often including innocent bystanders. When it is inwardly directed, the resulting self-hate renders victims incapable of meeting their own needs, let alone having energy available to love and care for others.

A study by researchers at the University of Michigan revealed that "the same regions of the brain that become active in response to painful sensory experiences are activated during intense experiences of social rejection." In other words, humiliation and loneliness are experienced as intensely as physical pain.

== Punishments and interrogation tactics ==
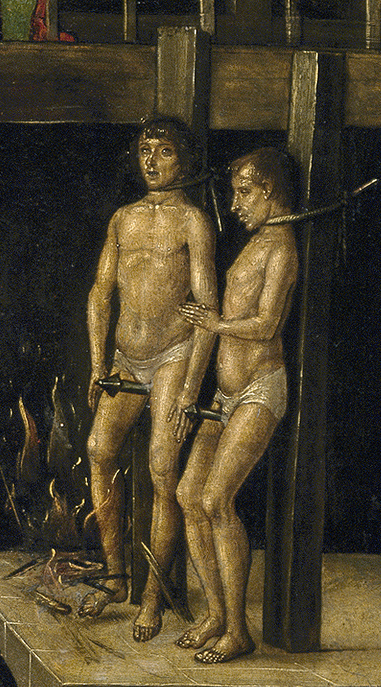
Non-trinitarian Cathars wearing loincloths being burnt at the stake in an auto-da-fé (c. 1495, with garrote and phallus), presided over by Saint Dominic, oil on panel by Pedro Berruguete.

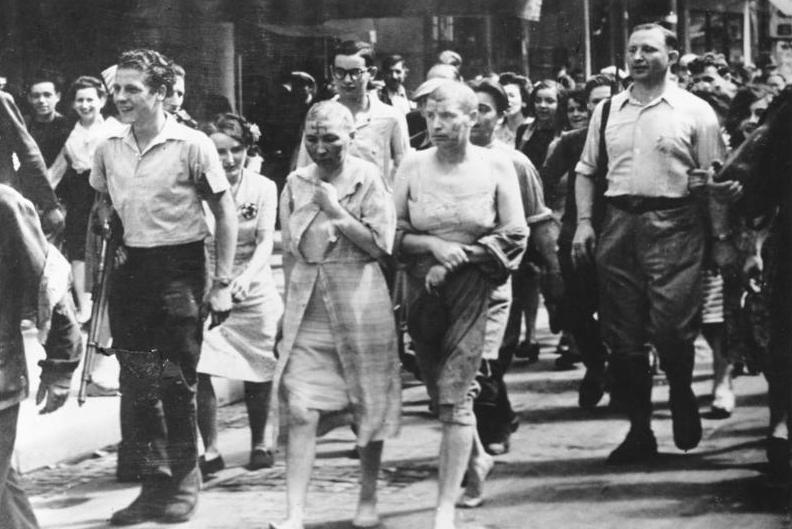
Paris 1944: Women accused of collaboration with Nazis are paraded through the streets barefoot, shaved, and with swastika burn marks on their faces.

Humiliation of one person by another (the humiliator) is often used as a way of asserting power over them, and is a common form of oppression or abuse used in a police, military, or prison context during legal interrogations or illegal torture sessions. Many now-obsolete public punishments were deliberately designed to be humiliating, e.g. tarring and feathering lawbreakers, pillory, "mark of shame" (stigma) as a means of "making an example" of a person and presenting a deterrent to others. Some practices, such as tarring and feathering, became tools of unofficial mob justice. In folk customs such as the English skimmington rides and rough music (and their continental equivalents, such as the French Charivari), dramatic public demonstrations of moral disapproval were enacted to humiliate transgressors and drive them out of the community.

Some U.S. states have experimented with humiliating or shaming lawbreakers by publishing their names and indicating their offense (e.g., with soliciting prostitutes or drinking and driving). In 2010, there was public outcry about reports showing police in Dongguan and Guangdong in China leading a parade of arrested prostitutes for the purpose of humiliating them. The national Ministry of Public Security reprimanded the local police and affirmed that such punishments are not allowed.

== A wider human perspective ==
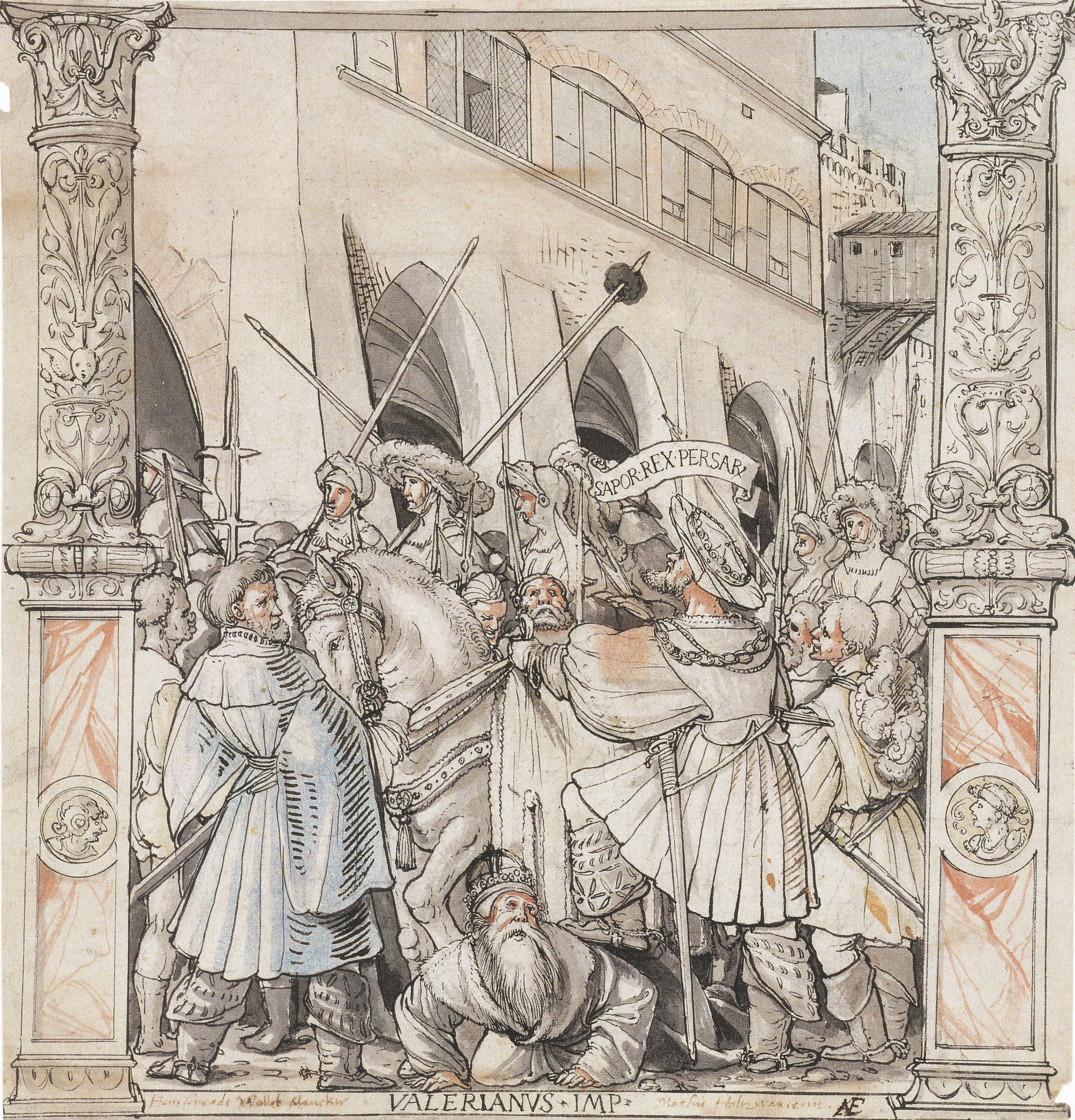
The Humiliation of Emperor Valerian by Shapur, King of Persia by Hans Holbein the Younger

Donald Klein described humiliation as "a powerful factor in human affairs that has, for a variety of reasons, been overlooked by students of individual and collective behavior. It is a pervasive and all too destructive influence in the behavior of individuals, groups, organizations, and nations."

Though it is a subjective emotion, humiliation has a universal aspect which applies to all human beings: "it is the feeling of being put down, made to feel less than one feels oneself to be."

A society that suffers from humiliation is an unstable one. The cognitive dissonance between the way in which the society is perceived and the way in which it sees itself can be so great that violence can result on a massive scale against people belonging to an out group. According to Jonathan Sacks, "By turning the question 'What did we do wrong?' into 'Who did this to us?', [hate against an out group] restores some measure of self-respect and provides a course of action. In psychiatry, the clinical terms for this process are splitting and projection; it allows people to define themselves as victims."

== See also ==
- Acts of repudiation
- Dehumanization
- Dignity taking
- Depression
- Domicide
- Erotic humiliation
- Hazing
- Humiliation of Christ
- Perpetrators, victims, and bystanders
- Public humiliation
- Schadenfreude
- Self-abasement
- Social defeat
- Social emotions
- Social stigma
- Torture
