= Christolytes =

6th-century Christian sect

The Christolytes were a Christian sect who appeared in the 6th century, who believed that when Jesus descended into hell, he left his soul and body there, and only rose with his divinity to heaven. Their existence was mentioned by John of Damascus.
