= Jacobus de Teramo =

Italian canon lawyer and bishop (1349–1417)

Jacobus Palladinus de Teramo (1349–1417), a member of the powerful family of Palladini, was an Italian canon lawyer and bishop. His birthplace, Teramo, was then part of the Kingdom of Naples (now in the Italian region of Abruzzo).

== Life ==
After studying canon law at the University of Padua, he was archdeacon at Aversa in 1384, and held several posts at the Papal Curia before being appointed successively bishop of Monopoli (1391), bishop of Taranto (1400), bishop of Florence (1401), and bishop of Spoleto (1410), where, as bishop, he was also Papal governor of the Duchy of Spoleto. At the Council of Pisa (June 1409) in the conclave that elected Alexander V, he was among the followers of Gregory XII and Benedict XIII.

In 1417, Pope Martin V sent him as legate to Poland, where he died the same year.

== Works ==
Jacobus is the author of a commentary on Peter Lombard's Libri quatuor sententiarum ("Sentences," printed at Augsburg, 1472); of a dialogue entitled De Pontificis Romani monarchia ("Of the Monarchy of the Roman Pontiffs"; not printed); and of a peculiar tract (written ca 1382) entitled Consolatio peccatorum, seu Processus Luciferi contra Jesum Christum. This "consolation of sinners" (with the colophon "Liber Bellial") is a lawsuit between Lucifer and Jesus Christ, Solomon presiding, in which the Devil is suing Christ for having trespassed by descending into Hell. At the first trial Moses is counsel for Jesus Christ and Belial for the Devil. At the second trial the Patriarch Joseph is judge, Aristotle and Isaiah defend Jesus Christ, and the Emperor Augustus and Jeremiah defend the Devil. In both trials the decision is in favor of Christ, but at the second trial the Devil is granted the right to take possession of the bodies and souls of the damned at the Last Judgment. This work was printed repeatedly and translated into several languages. A very early edition in German was printed by Albrecht Pfister in Bamberg in the 1460s. The work was later placed on the Index Librorum Prohibitorum. It was printed as late as 1611 at Hanover, as Processus Luciferi contra Iesum coram Iudice Salomone .

== Bibliography ==
- Palma, Niccola (1835–1936). Storia ecclesiastica e civile della regione più settentrionale del Regno di Napoli. Vol. V (1ª edizione ed.). Teramo, Ubaldo Angeletti. pp. 42–47.
- Angelo Mercati, Un vescovo fiorentino del primo Quattrocento millenarista, in “Rivista di Storia della Chiesa in Italia”, 1948, II, pp. 157–165.
- La chiesa fiorentina, Curia arcivescovile, Firenze 1970.
- F. Mastroberti, S. Vinci, M. Pepe, Il Liber Belial e il processo romano-canonico in Europa tra XV e XVI secolo, Bari, Cacucci, 2012.
- M. Pepe, Iacopo da Teramo e il trattato De monarchia mundi. Una costruzione teocratica negli anni dello scisma, Napoli, Editoriale Scientifica, 2020.
- Herbermann, Charles, ed. (1913). "Jacobus de Teramo" . Catholic Encyclopedia. New York: Robert Appleton Company.
- Michael Tilly (1990). "Jacobus (Palladini) de Teramo". In Bautz, Friedrich Wilhelm (ed.). Biographisch-Bibliographisches Kirchenlexikon (BBKL) (in German). Vol. 2. Hamm: Bautz. col. 1413. ISBN 3-88309-032-8.
