= Belial =

Term in the Hebrew Bible/Old Testament; later denoted a devil or fallen angel

Seal of Belial (Ars Goetia)

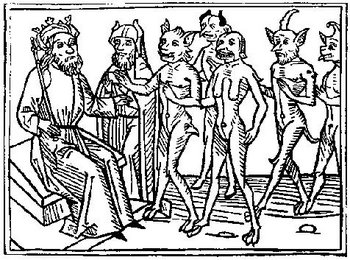
A woodcut of Belial and some of his followers from a German edition of Jacobus de Teramo's book Consolatio peccatorum, seu Processus Luciferi contra Jesum Christum (1473).

Belial (/ˈbiːli.əl/; Hebrew: בְּלִיַּעַל, Bəlīyyaʿal) is a term occurring in the Hebrew Bible/Old Testament which later became personified as the devil in Christian texts of the New Testament. Alternate spellings include Baalial, Balial, Belhor, Beliall, Beliar, Berial, Bylyl and Beliya'al. Early usage of Belial referred to "wickedness" or "worthlessness", occurring several times in the Old Testament. Later, in the Dead Sea Scrolls (c. 300 BCE), Belial was personified as a demon.

In the Secret Book of John, an early Gnostic text, the ruler of the underworld is referred to as Belias.

== Hebrew Bible/Old Testament ==
Belial is a Hebrew word "used to characterize the wicked or worthless". The etymology of the word is often understood as "lacking worth", from two common words: beli- (בְּלִי "without-") and ya'al (יָעַל "to be of value").

Some scholars translate it from Hebrew as "worthless" (Beli yo'il), while others translate it as "yokeless" (Beli ol), "may he have no rising" or "never to rise" (Beli ya'al). Only a few etymologists have believed it to be an invented name from the start.

The word occurs twenty-seven times in the Masoretic Text, in verses such as the Book of Proverbs (Proverbs 6:12), where the King James Version (KJV) translates the Hebrew phrase adam beli-yaal as "a naughty person".

In the Hebrew text, the phrase is either "sons of Belial" or simply "sons of worthlessness". Phrases beginning with "sons of" are a common Semitic idiom, such as "sons of destruction" or "sons of lawlessness". In Semitic languages, the term "sons of" (in any context other than preceding the name of an actual human being) is better explained as "people defined by." "Sons of worthlessness/belial" means "people defined by worthlessness." Another common example of this is Aramaic term "Bar Mitzva" (literally "son of the commandment," but better translated as "one defined by the commandment" as it refers to an individual who is obligated to fulfill the commandment of God).

Of these 27 occurrences, the idiom "sons of Belial" (בְּנֵֽי־בְלִיַּעַל beni beliyaal) appears 15 times to indicate worthless people, including idolaters (Deuteronomy 13:13), the men of Gibeah (Judges 19:22, 20:13), the sons of Eli (1 Samuel 2:12), Nabal, and Shimei. The Geneva Bible (1560) uses "wicked", and at the Book of Judges 19:22 has the marginal note "Ebr [Hebrew] men of Belial: that is, given to all wickednes." In the KJV these occurrences are rendered with "Belial" capitalised:

- "the sons of Eli were sons of Belial" (KJV)

In modern versions these are usually read as a phrase:

- "the sons of Eli were worthless men" (1 Samuel 2:12, NRSV and NIV)
- "the wicked men of the city" (Judges 19:22, NIV)

"Belial" is applied to ideas, words, and counsel, to calamitous circumstances, and most frequently, to worthless men of the lowest sort, such as men who would induce worship of other gods; those of Benjamin who committed the sex crime at Gibeah; the wicked sons of Eli; insolent Nabal; opposers of God's anointed, David; Rehoboam's unsteady associates; Jezebel's conspirators against Naboth; and men in general who stir up contention. Indicating that the enemy power would no longer interfere with the carrying out of true worship by his people in their land, YHWH declared in Nahum 1:15 "No more will any worthless person pass again through you. In his entirety he will certainly be cut off."

== Second Temple period ==
The term belial appears frequently in Jewish texts of the Second Temple period (texts classified by Christians as the Old Testament pseudepigrapha and apocrypha). Also a large number of references to Belial are evidenced in the Dead Sea Scrolls discovered at Qumran from 1948.

=== Dead Sea Scrolls ===
In The War of the Sons of Light Against the Sons of Darkness, one of the Dead Sea Scrolls, Belial is the leader of the Sons of Darkness:

You made Belial for the pit, angel of enmity; in darkness is his domain, his counsel is to bring about wickedness and guilt. All the spirits of his lot are angels of destruction, they walk in the laws of darkness; towards it goes their only desire.

In the Rules of the Community, God is depicted as saying, "I shall not comfort the oppressed until their path is perfect. I shall not retain Belial within my heart." Belial controls all demons, which are specifically allotted to him by God for the purpose of performing evil. Belial, despite his malevolent disposition, is considered an angel.

Belial's presence is found throughout the War Scrolls and is established as the force occupying the opposite end of the spectrum of God. In Col. I, verse 1, the first line of the document, it is stated that "the first attack of the Sons of Light shall be undertaken against the forces of the Sons of Darkness, the army of Belial." This dichotomy sheds light on the negative connotations that Belial held at the time.

The War Scroll and the Thanksgiving hymns both delve into the idea that Belial is accursed by God and his people, and shows how the existence of Belial in this world can be attributed to the mysteries of God since we can not know why he permits the dealings of Belial to persist.

In the Dead Sea Scrolls, Belial is further contrasted with God. These are the Angel of Light and the Angel of Darkness. The Manual of Discipline identifies the Angel of Light as God himself. The Angel of Darkness is identified in the same scroll as Belial.

The Dead Sea Scrolls also provide a recounting of a dream of Amram, the father of Moses, who finds two watchers contesting over him. One is Belial who is described as the King of Evil and Prince of Darkness. Belial is also mentioned in the Fragments of a Zadokite Work (which is also known as The Damascus Document (CD)), which states that during the eschatological age, "Belial shall be let loose against Israel, as God spoke through Isaiah the prophet." The Fragments also speak of "three nets of Belial" which are said to be fornication, wealth, and pollution of the sanctuary. In this work, Belial is sometimes presented as an agent of divine punishment and sometimes as a rebel, as Mastema is. It was Belial who inspired the Egyptian sorcerers, Jochaneh and his brother, to oppose Moses and Aaron. The Fragments also say that anyone who is ruled by the spirits of Belial and speaks of rebellion should be condemned as a necromancer and a wizard.

=== Jubilees ===
In the Book of Jubilees, uncircumcised Israelites are called "sons of Belial".

=== Testament of the Twelve Patriarchs ===
Belial is also mentioned in the Testaments of the Twelve Patriarchs. The author of the work seems to be a dualist because he presents Belial as God's opponent, not as a servant, but does not mention how or why this came to be. Simeon 5:3 says that fornication separates man from God and brings him near to Belial. Levi tells his children to choose between the Law of God and the works of Belial It also states that when the soul is constantly disturbed, the Lord departs from it and Belial rules over it. Naphtali contrasts the Law and will of God with the purposes of Belial. Also, in 20:2, Joseph prophesies that when Israel leaves Egypt, they will be with God in light while Belial will remain in darkness with the Egyptians. Finally, the Testament describes that when the Messiah comes, the angels will punish the spirits of deceit and Belial and that the Messiah will bind Belial and give to his children the power to trample the evil spirits.

For many hath fornication destroyed; because, though a man be old or noble, it maketh him a reproach and a laughing-stock with Beliar and the sons of men.

=== Ascension of Isaiah ===
In the Ascension of Isaiah, Belial is the angel of lawlessness and "the ruler of this world", and identified as Samael and Satan.

And Manasseh turned aside his heart to serve Belial; for the angel of lawlessness, who is the ruler of this world, is Belial, whose name is Matanbuchus.

— (Ascension of Isaiah 2:4)

== Christianity/New Testament ==
The word occurs just once in the New Testament, when Paul the Apostle asks:

[W]hat concord hath Christ with Belial? or what part hath he that believeth with an infidel?

— 2 Corinthians 6:15

The spelling found in most manuscripts of 2 Corinthians is actually Beliar (Βελιάρ) not Belial (Βελίαλ). This is the reading preferred by textual scholars and the change of -l to -r is attributed to a common change in Aramaic pronunciation.

The Jewish Greek Septuagint, later the Old Testament of the early Christian church, generally renders the "sons of Belial" verses in the Hebrew Bible either as "lawless men", by idioms "sons of the pestilence", rather than a personal name "sons of Belial":

- andres paranomoi ("lawless men" ἄνδρες παράνομοι) (Deuteronomy 13:13)
- huioi loimoi ("sons of the plague" υἱοὶ λοιμοὶ) (1 Samuel 2:12)

The Septuagint also avoids Belial in the singular so Shimei (2 Samuel 16:7) when he cursed David, "Come out, come out, thou bloody man, and thou man of Belial" is rendered "you lawless man" (paranomos), and Hannah to Eli "Count not thine handmaid for a daughter of Belial" is rendered "don't count your maidservant as a daughter of the pest." The Latin Vulgate and Syriac Peshitta Old Testaments in some cases follow the Greek, in other literalize as Hebrew. The single New Testament use is preserved "Belial" in Latin and Syriac.

== Rabbinical literature ==
The Talmud and rabbinical interpretation generally present Belial as an allegorical personification of evil, consistent with its usage in the Torah and later Jewish texts. The phrase "sons of Belial" appears in various rabbinic writings as a reference to wicked or corrupt individuals.

The Teliya Yeshu (a variant of the Toledot Yeshu, a later medieval anti-Christian text) applies the name Belial to Yeshu, whom it describes as the son of Miriam Migdala. However, these writings are not part of mainstream Talmudic tradition and are generally considered polemical or satirical rather than historical.

The claim that Yeshu is the son of "Miriam Magdala" is misleading. The Talmud does not mention Mary Magdalene from the New Testament. Instead, it refers to a Miriam Migdala (מרים מגדלא), likely meaning "Miriam the hairdresser", which has no connection to the historical Mary Magdalene. Additionally, the figures Ben Stada and Ben Pandera (son of a Roman Soldier) are debated within Talmudic scholarship, and there is no definitive evidence linking them to Jesus (Yeshua) of the New Testament.

== English literature ==
John Milton, Paradise Lost, Book I:

BELIAL came last, than whom a Spirit more lewd
Fell not from Heaven, or more gross to love
Vice for it self: To him no Temple stood
Or Altar smoak'd; yet who more oft then hee
In Temples and at Altars, when the Priest
Turns Atheist, as did ELY'S Sons, who fill'd
With lust and violence the house of God.
In Courts and Palaces he also Reigns
And in luxurious Cities, where the noyse
Of riot ascends above thir loftiest Towrs,
And injury and outrage: And when Night
Darkens the Streets, then wander forth the Sons
Of BELIAL, flown with insolence and wine.
Witness the Streets of SODOM, and that night
In GIBEAH, when hospitable Dores
Yielded thir Matrons to prevent worse rape.

John Milton, Paradise Lost, Book 2:

... On th' other side up rose
BELIAL, in act more graceful and humane;
A fairer person lost not Heav'n; he seemd
For dignity compos'd and high exploit:
But all was false and hollow; though his Tongue
Dropt Manna, and could make the worse appear
The better reason, to perplex and dash
Maturest Counsels: for his thoughts were low;
To vice industrious, but to Nobler deeds
Timorous and slothful: yet he pleas'd the eare...

Robert Browning (1839), "Soliloquy of the Spanish Cloister", eighth stanza:

Or, my scrofulous French novel
On gray paper with blunt type !
Simply glance at it, you grovel
Hand and foot in BELIAL's gripe:
If I double down its pages
At the woeful sixteenth print,
When he gathers his greengages,
Ope a sieve and slip it in't?

== Occult ==
The 17th-century grimoire The Lesser Key of Solomon mentions Belial, as does Aleister Crowley's Goetia (1904) and Anton LaVey's The Satanic Bible (1969). In The Satanic Bible, Belial is listed as one of the Four Crown Princes of Hell, and the third book of The Satanic Bible is The Book of Belial.

In 1937, Edgar Cayce used the term "sons of belial" and (in opposition to) the "sons of the law of one" for the first time in one of his deep trance readings given between 1923 and 1945. Cayce was often referred to as the "sleeping prophet" who gave over 2,500 readings to individuals while in a deep trance state. While his definition of the sons of belial was consistent with the Hebrew meaning of "worthless" individuals focused on self-gratification, Cayce went on to use the term frequently to compare opposing human forces at work in pre-historical times related to the early development of Atlantis.

== In popular culture ==
Popular culture in the 20th century included many references to Belial; notably in the celebrated silent film Nosferatu (1922), Aldous Huxley's novel Ape and Essence (1948), Philip K. Dick's novel The Divine Invasion (1981), the cult horror film Basket Case (1982), Dean Koontz's novel Phantoms (1983), and Graham Masterton's novel Master of Lies (1991). Belial has also experienced a resurgence in popularity during the 21st Century in numerous media, with video games being the most prominent.

== See also ==
- List of theological demons
- Asmodai
- Bel
- Demon
- Devil
- Samael
- Satan
- Serpent
- Sin
