= Liber Belial =

Jacobus de Teramo's 14th-century writing of Lucifer's lawsuit against Christ

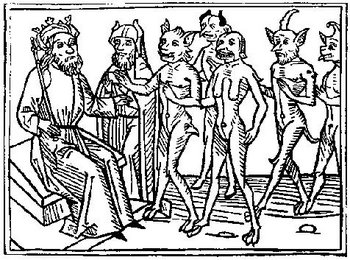
- A woodcut of Belial and some of his followers from a German edition of Liber Belial (1473).
- Author: Jacobus de Teramo
- Original title: Consolatio peccatorum
- Language: Latin
- Genre: Allegory, Legal literature
- Publication date: 1382
- Media type: Manuscript (printed in 1472)

Liber Belial (The Book of Belial) or Consolatio peccatorum, is a tract written by Jacobus de Teramo in around 1382. It discusses a lawsuit between Lucifer and Jesus Christ, Solomon presiding, in which the Devil is suing Christ for having trespassed by descending into Hell. This work was printed repeatedly and translated into several languages.

== Description ==
The book describes not one, but two trials between Lucifer and Jesus Christ, before a tribunal presided over by Solomon, in which the devil pursues Christ for having committed an intrusion into his domain during his descent into Hell. At the first trial Moses is counsel for Jesus Christ and Belial for the Devil. At the second trial the Patriarch Joseph is judge, Aristotle and Isaiah defend Jesus Christ, and the Emperor Augustus and Jeremiah defend the Devil. In both trials the decision is in favor of Christ, but at the second trial the Devil is granted the right to take possession of the bodies and souls of the damned at the Last Judgment.

The work must be seen as an allegory to the historical events of the time: the descent of Jesus into hell and the liberation of the Patriarchs is a metaphor of the end of the Avignon papacy and the return of the papacy to Rome (in 1378), the subsequent reaction of the demons is represented by the antipope (Satan). The solution proposed by Paladini to resolve the dispute between Satan and Jesus, namely to entrust the cause to an impartial tribunal of arbitration, is the one adopted to resolve the schism of the West, with the convening of a council - the first in Pisa (1409), but without success, then at the Council of Constance - which obtained in 1415 the resignation of Pope Gregory XII, overthrew the antipope Benedict XIII of Avignon, and elected Pope Martin V to the papacy.

== Editions ==
This work has been printed several times and translated into several languages. An early edition is in German and was printed by Albrecht Pfister in Bamberg in the 1460s.

it was printed at Augsburg in 1472 as Das Buch Belial (The Book of Belial), illustrated with woodcuts in 1473, and, although subsequently, the work was listed on Index librorum prohibitorum, Gerard Leeu printed another edition in Latin in Gouda, 1481.

It was also printed again in 1611 at Hanover, under the title Processus Luciferi contra Iesum coram Iudice Salomone.
