= Homily =

Commentary that follows a reading of scripture

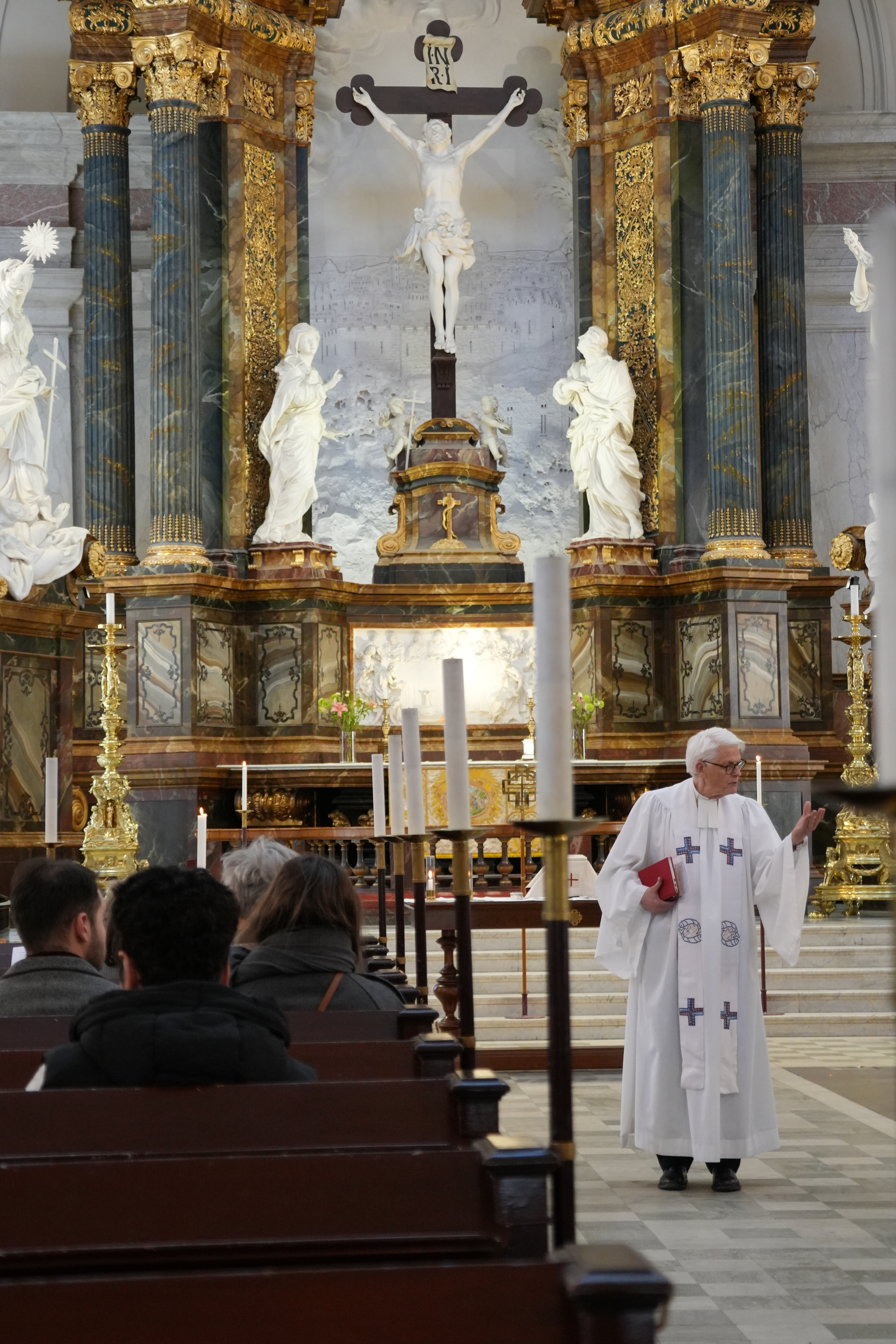
An Evangelical Lutheran priest of the Church of Sweden delivering a homily on Easter Friday at Gustaf Vasa Church in Stockholm, Sweden

A homily (from Greek ὁμιλία, homilía) is a commentary that follows a reading of scripture, giving the "public explanation of a sacred doctrine" or text. The works of Origen and John Chrysostom (known as Paschal Homily) are considered exemplary forms of Christian homily.

In Catholic, Evangelical Lutheran, Anglican, and Eastern Orthodox Churches, a homily is usually given during Mass (Divine Liturgy or Holy Qurbana for Orthodox, Eastern Lutheran, and Eastern Catholic Churches, and Divine Service for the Lutheran Church) at the end of the Liturgy of the Word. Many people consider it synonymous with a sermon.

The English word homily is derived from the Ancient Greek word ὁμιλία homilia, which means discourse or interaction with other people (derived from the word homilos, meaning "a gathering"). The word is used in 1 Corinthians 15:33 ("wicked homiliai corrupt good morals"). The related verb is used in Luke 24:14 (as homiloun), and in Acts 24:26 (as homilei), both used in the sense of "speaking with". The word later came to have a more technical sense. According to The Catholic Encyclopedia, Origen was the first to distinguish between logos (sermo) and homilia (tractatus).

== Roman Catholic Mass homily ==
The General Instruction of the Roman Missal (GIRM), the official document governing the celebration of Mass, states that:

65. The Homily is part of the Liturgy and is strongly recommended, for it is necessary for the nurturing of the Christian life. It should be an exposition of some aspect of the readings from Sacred Scripture or of another text from the Ordinary or from the Proper of the Mass of the day and should take into account both the mystery being celebrated and the particular needs of the listeners.

The GIRM and the 1983 Code of Canon Law prescribe that the preaching of the Homily is reserved to ordained ministers (bishops, priests, and deacons) and never to lay persons, and is required on Sundays, Holy Days of Obligation, and Masses that are celebrated with the participation of a congregation.

== Other senses ==
Contemporary Protestant clergy often use the term 'homily' to describe a short sermon, such as one created for a wedding or funeral.

In colloquial, non-religious, usage, homily often means a sermon concerning a practical matter, a moralizing lecture or admonition, or an inspirational saying or platitude, but sermon is the more appropriate word in these cases.

== See also ==
- Homiliarium
- Homiletics
- Postil
- Dharma talk
- D'var Torah
- Quranic studies

== Bibliography ==
- Origen. (2010). Homilies on Leviticus, 1-16. United States: Catholic University of America Press.
- Marriott, C., Chrysostom, J., Morris, J. B. (2015). The Homilies of S. John Chrysostom, Archbishop of Constantinople, on the Epistle of St. Paul the Apostle to the Romans - Scholar's Choice Edition. United Kingdom: Creative Media Partners, LLC.
- St. John Chrysostom commentary on the Psalms. (1998). United States: Holy Cross Orthodox Press.
- Instructions to Preachers from "Sermons for all the Sundays in the year", Dublin : Duffy (1882) by Alphonsus Liguori
- Beecher, Patrick A. (1910). "Homily" . In Herbermann, Charles (ed.). Catholic Encyclopedia. Vol. 7. New York: Robert Appleton Company.
