= Humiliation of Christ =

Protestant Christian doctrine

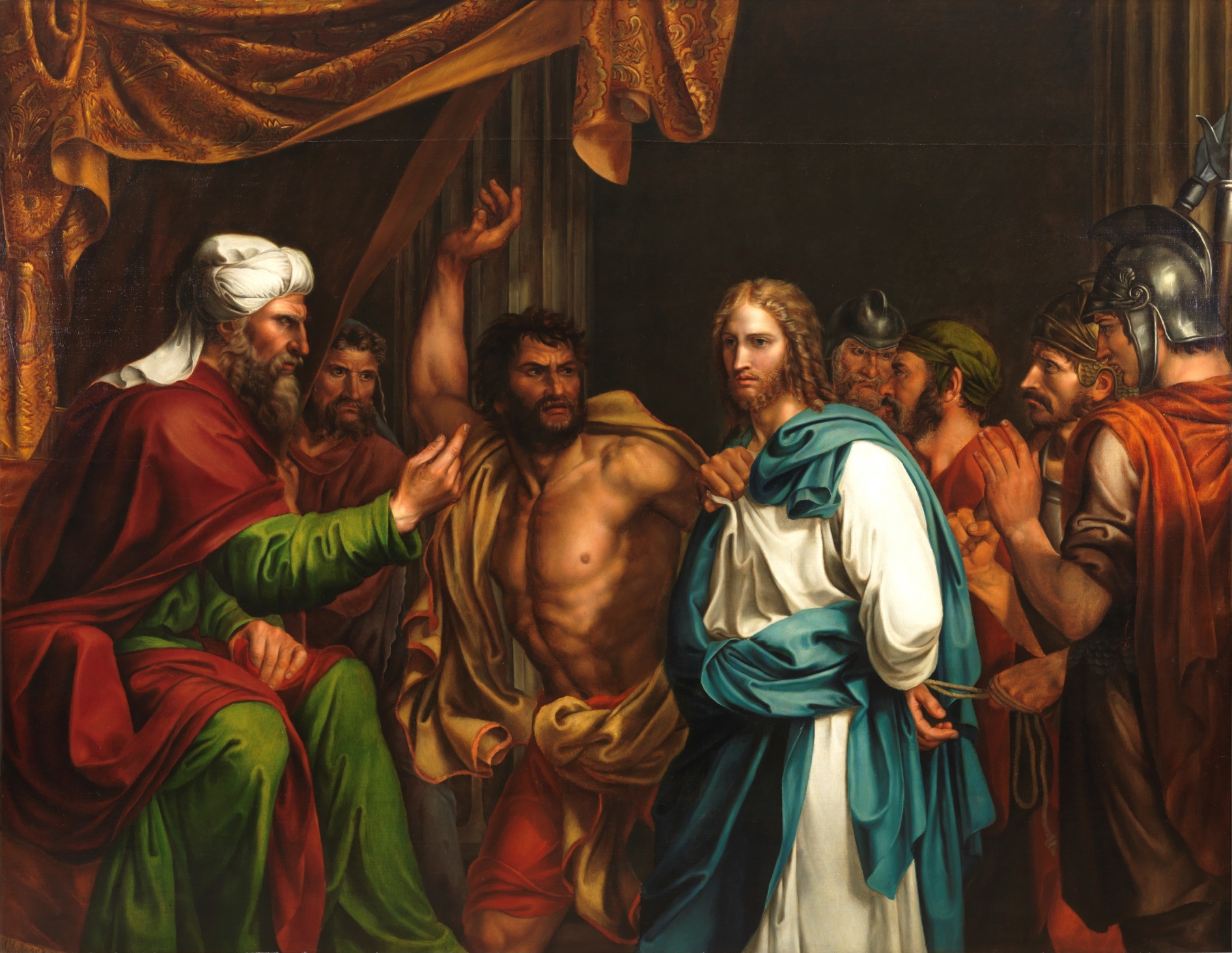
Jesus about to be struck in front of the High Priest Annas, during his Sanhedrin trial, depicted by Madrazo, 1803

The Humiliation of Christ is a Protestant Christian doctrine that consists of the rejection and suffering that Jesus received and accepted, according to Christian belief. Within it are included his incarnation, suffering, death, burial, and sometimes descent into hell.

== State of humiliation ==
Calvinist theology draws a distinction between Christ's "state of humiliation", which consisted of his suffering and death, and his "state of exaltation", which consisted of his resurrection, ascension, and heavenly session. According to the Westminster Shorter Catechism, Christ’s humiliation "consisted in his being born, and that in a low condition, made under the law, undergoing the miseries of this life, the wrath of God, and the cursed death of the cross; in being buried, and continuing under the power of death for a time."

The distinction between the states of humiliation and exaltation does present difficulties in explaining the idea that Christ won a victory on the cross. Peter Leithart notes that while the cross and resurrection are often thought of as a "U-shaped series of events", John's gospel, with its emphasis on the cross as the being the glorification of Christ (John 12:23), "pictures the death, resurrection, and ascension as points along a straight line, with a steep positive slope. The cross is not stairway that leads down, but the first step of a stairway whose head reaches into the heavens."

== Biblical basis ==
The belief of this comes from several places in the Bible. One passage says

He was despised and rejected by men;
a man of sorrows, and acquainted with grief;
and as one from whom men hide their faces
he was despised, and we esteemed him not.

— Isaiah 53:3

Christians interpret this as referring to the later coming of Jesus.

The Epistle to the Philippians in the Christian New Testament reads:

And being found in human form, he humbled himself by becoming obedient to the point of death, even death on a cross.

— Philippians 2:8

(See kenosis.)

== Examples of humiliation ==
- Christ was put to shame at his birth. The Christian belief is that God could do anything, so the question is asked, "Why was Christ made so lowly by being born in a stable and laid upon a manger?"
- Herod sent out soldiers to kill him. Jesus was saved from death as a mere baby by a miracle. The Christian belief is that this was God.
- Christ was rejected by his own town's synagogue. He read from Isaiah and the people rejected him. Jesus stated that no prophet was accepted in his own town. The people were filled with wrath and tried to kill him.
- Christ was put to shame for doing miracles such as casting demons out of men.
- Jesus was rejected by his own people in favour of Barabbas, a criminal. He was then spat upon, beaten and mocked by the Roman soldiers.
- The ultimate form of humiliation, Christ was crucified while being mocked.

== Humility ==
In Early Christianity, the prevalent view of Jesus was based on the Kyrios image (Greek: κύριος) as "the Lord and Master", e.g. in his Transfiguration. In the 13th century a major turning point was the development of the "tender image of Jesus" as the Franciscans began to emphasize his humility from birth in a humble setting to his death on the cross. The Nativity scene promoted by Saint Francis of Assisi portrayed a softer image of Jesus. The concept that the omnipotent Creator would set aside all power in order to conquer the hearts of men by love and that he would have been helplessly placed in a manger was touching to the believers as that of the sacrifice of dying on the cross in Calvary.

== See also ==
- Exaltation of Christ
