= Paschal Homily =

Easter sermon by Saint John Chrysostom

The Paschal homily or sermon (also known in Greek as Hieratikon or as the Catechetical Homily) was written by St. John Chrysostom (died 407).

It is read aloud at Paschal matins, the service that begins Easter, in Eastern Orthodox and Byzantine Catholic churches. According to the tradition of the Church, no one sits during the reading of the Paschal homily. Portions of it are often done with the interactive participation of the congregation.

Scholarship since Montfaucon has generally rejected the authorship of Chrysostom.

== The Homily ==
Translation from the website of Cathedral of St. John the Baptist (Washington, D.C.)

If any be devout and God-loving, let him enjoy this fair and radiant triumph. If any be a good and wise servant, let him enter rejoicing into the joy of his Lord. If any be weary of fasting, let him now receive his reward. If any have labored from the first hour, let him receive today his rightful due. If any have come at the third hour, let him feast with thankfulness. If any have arrived at the sixth hour, let him in no wise be in doubt, for in no wise shall he suffer loss. If any be delayed even until the ninth hour, let him draw near, doubting nothing, fearing nothing. If any have tarried even until the eleventh hour, let him not be fearful on account of his lateness; for the Master, Who is jealous of His honor, receiveth the last even as the first. He giveth rest to him that cometh at the eleventh hour, as well as to him that hath labored from the first hour; and to the last He is merciful, and the first He pleaseth; to the one He giveth, and to the other He bestoweth; and He receiveth the works, and welcometh the intention; and the deed He honoureth, and the offering He praiseth. Wherefore, then, enter ye all into the joy of your Lord; both the first and the second, receive ye your reward. Ye rich and ye poor, with one another exult.

Ye sober and ye slothful, honor the day. Ye that have kept the fast and ye that have not, be glad today. The table is full-laden, delight ye all. The calf is fatted; let none go forth hungry. Let all enjoy the feast of faith, receive all ye the riches of goodness. Let no one bewail his poverty, for the universal kingdom hath been revealed. Let no one weep for his transgressions, for forgiveness hath dawned from the tomb. Let no one fear death, for the death of the Saviour hath set us free. He hath quench by it, He hath led hades captive, He Who descended into hades. He embittered it, when it tasted of His flesh. And foretelling this, Isaiah cried: "Hades," he saith, "was embittered when it encountered Thee below." It was embittered, for it was abolished. It was embittered, for it was mocked. It was embittered, for it was slain. It was embittered, for it was overthrown. It was embittered, for it was fettered. It received a body and encountered God. It received earth, and met heaven. It received that which it saw, and fell to what it did not see. O death, where is thy sting? O hades, where is thy victory?

Christ is risen, and thou art cast down.

Christ is risen, and the demons are fallen.

Christ is risen, and the angels rejoice.

Christ is risen, and life flourisheth.

Christ is risen, and there is none dead in the tombs.

For Christ, being risen from the dead, is become the first-fruits of them that have fallen asleep. To Him be glory and dominion unto the ages of ages. Amen.

== Links to different translations of the Paschal Homily ==
- Prepared by André Lavergne on worship.ca
- Translated by Frank Dobbs
- Anglicans Online
