= Giuseppe Melani =

Italian painter (1673–1747)

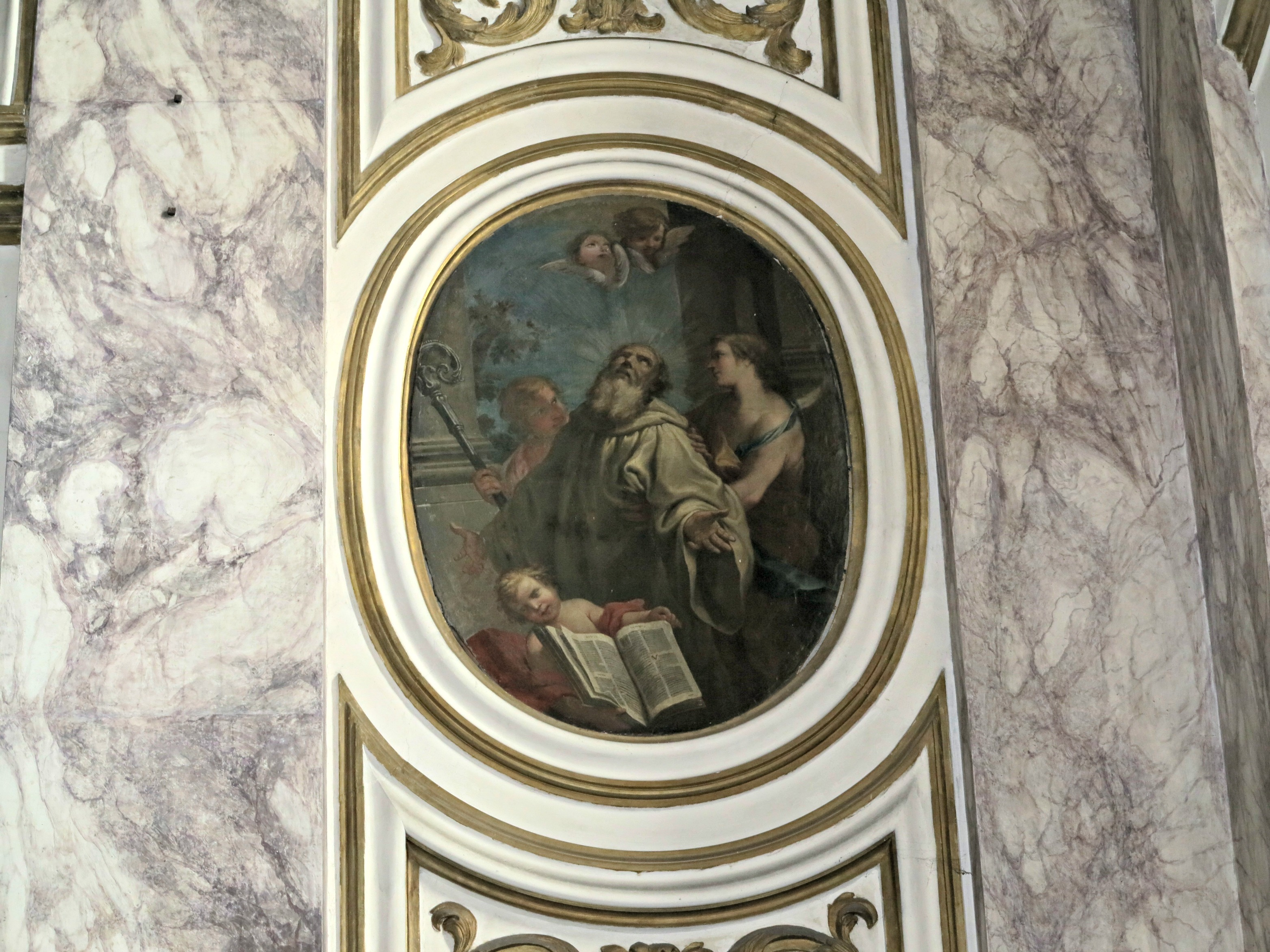
Death of St. Benedict

Giuseppe Melani (13 August 1673 – 7 November 1747) was an Italian painter of the late-Baroque period, active mainly in Pisa where he was born.

== Biography ==
His father, Pietro Melani, was a painter. He initially apprenticed with Camillo Gabrielli, a pupil of Ciro Ferri. For the Pisa Cathedral, he painted a Death of San Ranieri. He also painted figures for architectural frescoes, such as the vault of San Matteo (c. 1720) in Pisa, along with his brother Francesco Melani (also an architect, April 7, 1675 – August 21, 1742). Among the pupils of Melani were Tommaso Tommasi, Giuseppe Bracci, Jacopo Donati, Bartolommeo Santini, and Ranieri Gabbrielli.

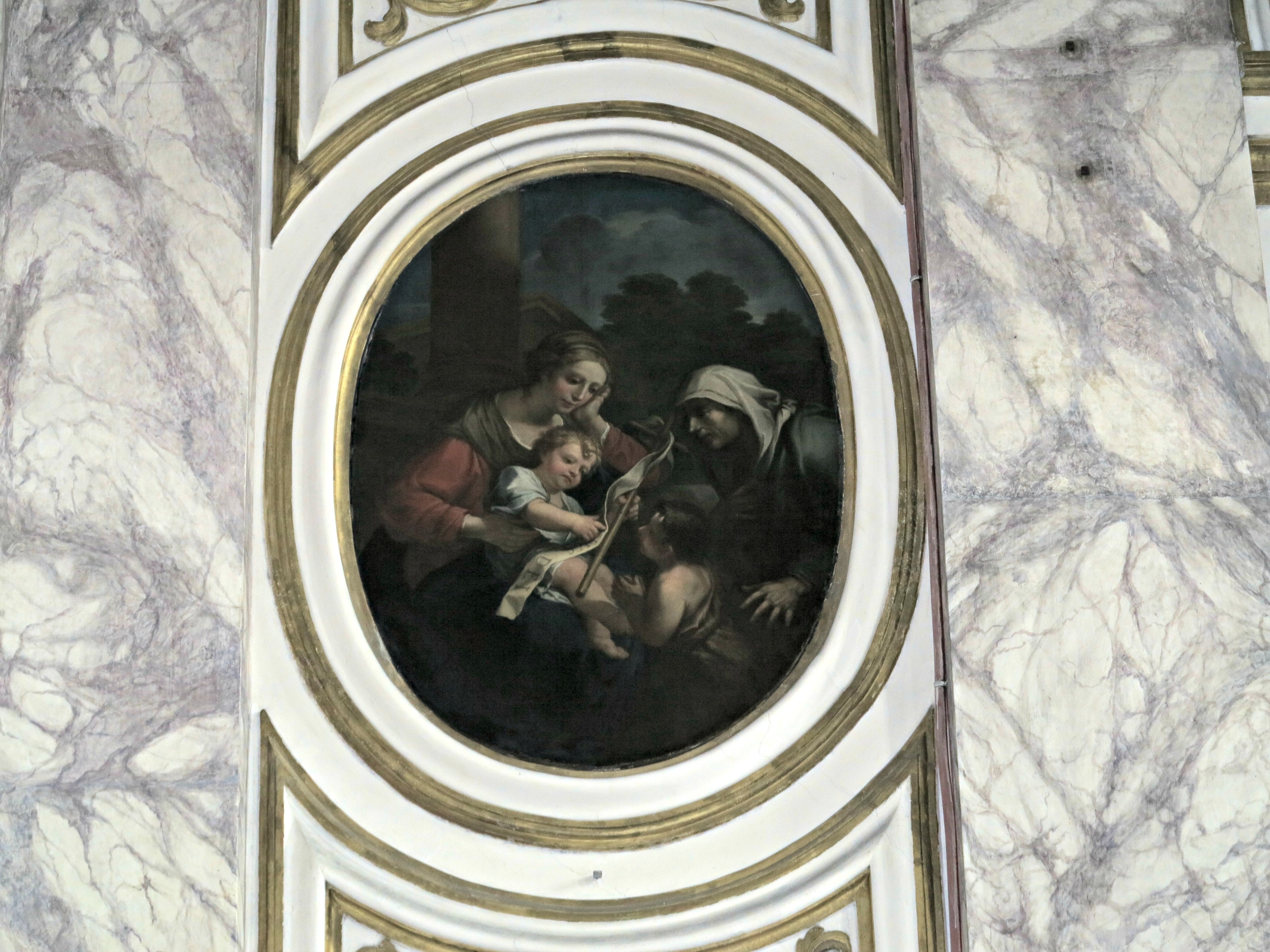
Madonna and Child with Saint Elizabeth and Saint John the Baptist
