= Ananias Curing Saul's Blindness =

1660 painting by Ciro Ferri

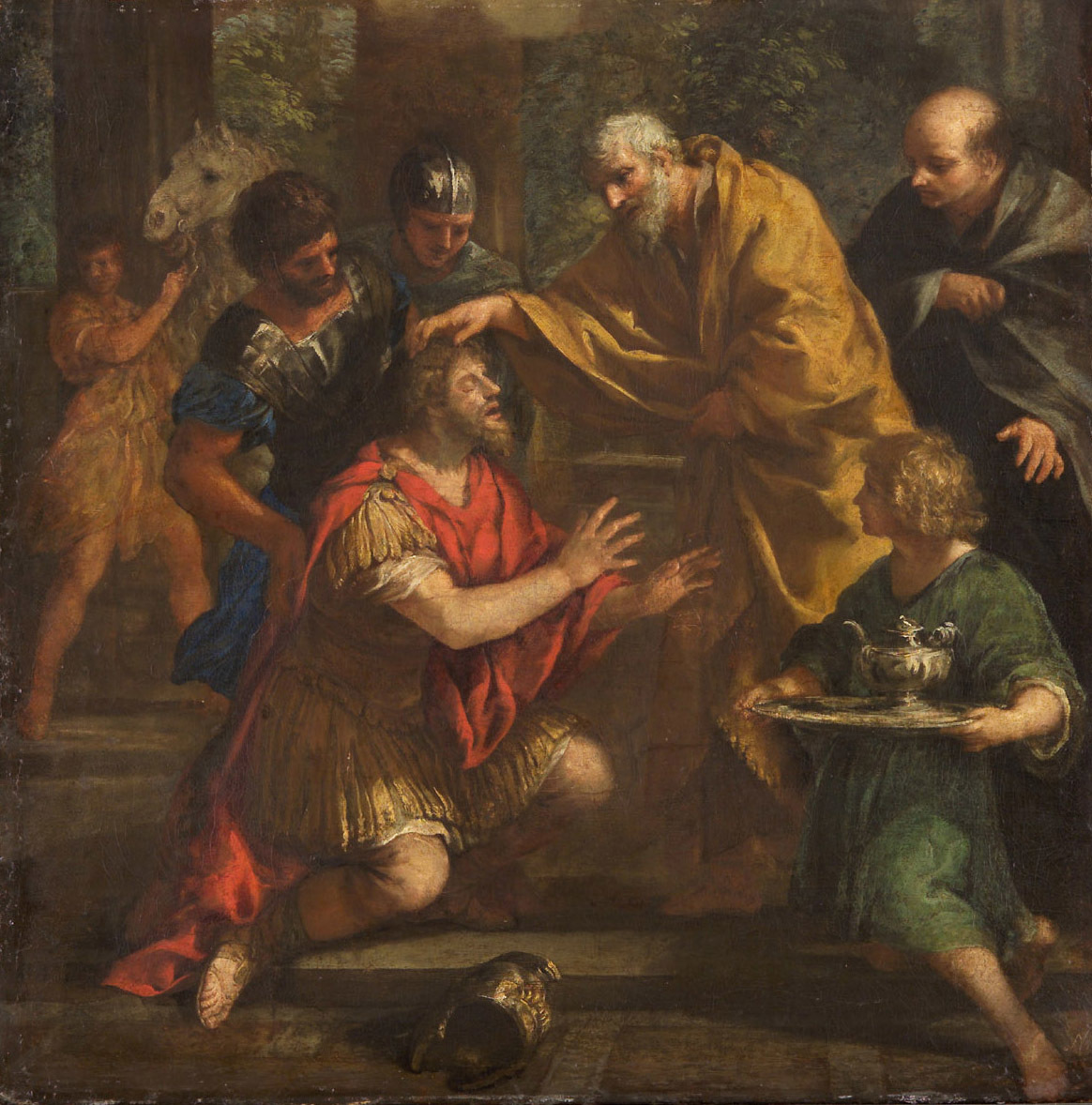
- Artist: Ciro Ferri
- Year: 1660
- Dimensions: 52.5 cm × 53 cm (20.7 in × 21 in)
- Location: Kunsthistorisches Museum, Vienna

Ananias Curing Saul's Blindness is a 1660 painting by Ciro Ferri, now in the Kunsthistorisches Museum in Vienna. It shows Ananias' visiting Paul of Tarsus to cure his temporary blindness.
