= Kunsthistorisches Museum =

Art museum in Vienna, Austria

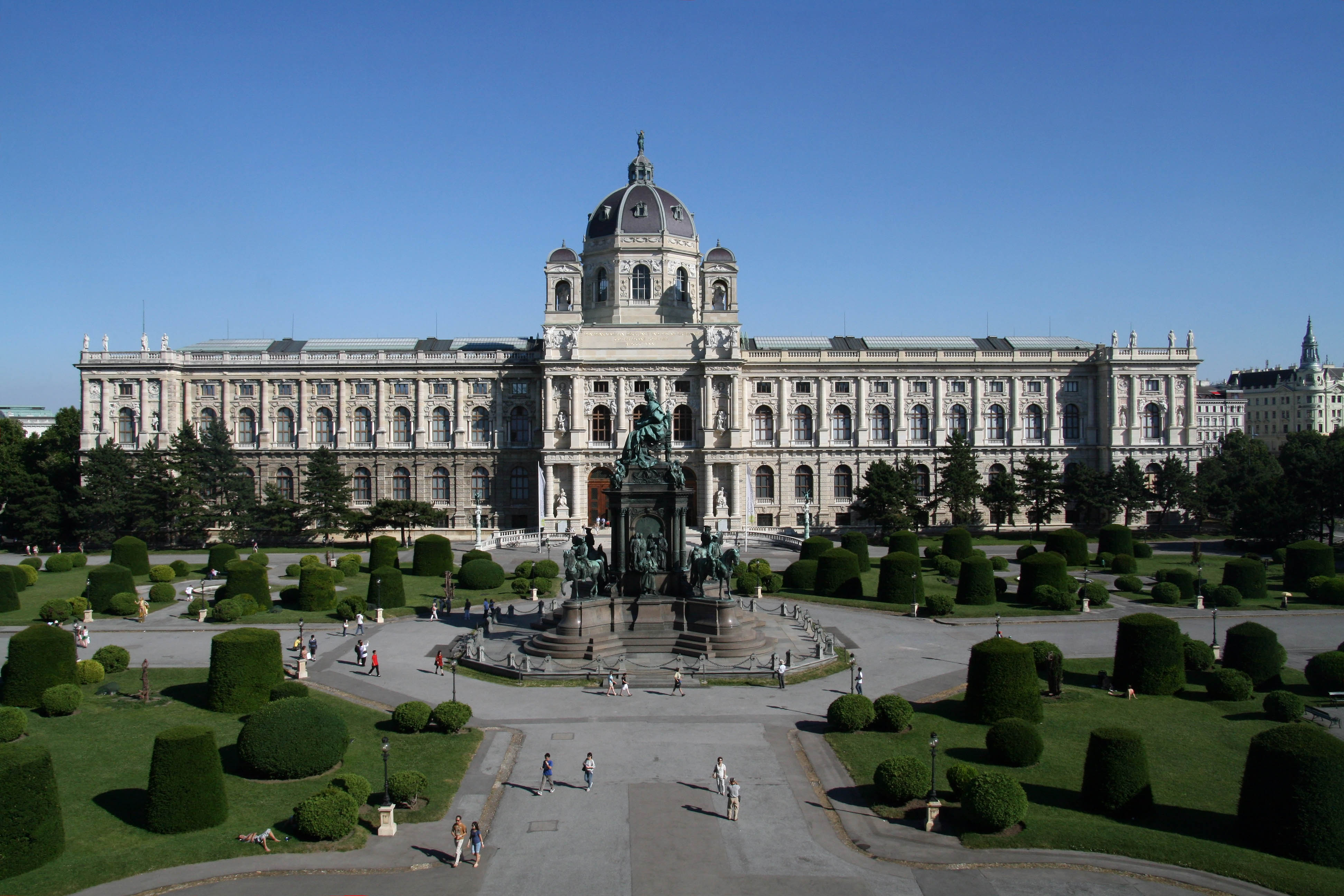
- Kunsthistorisches Museum in Vienna with Maria-Theresien-Platz
- Interactive fullscreen map
- Established: 1871–1891
- Location: Maria Theresien Platz Vienna, Austria
- Coordinates: 48°12′14″N 16°21′42″E
- Type: Art museum
- Visitors: 1,688,509 (2023)
- Director: Jonathan Fine (since 2025)
- Architects: Karl Hasenauer; Gottfried Semper
- Website: www.khm.at

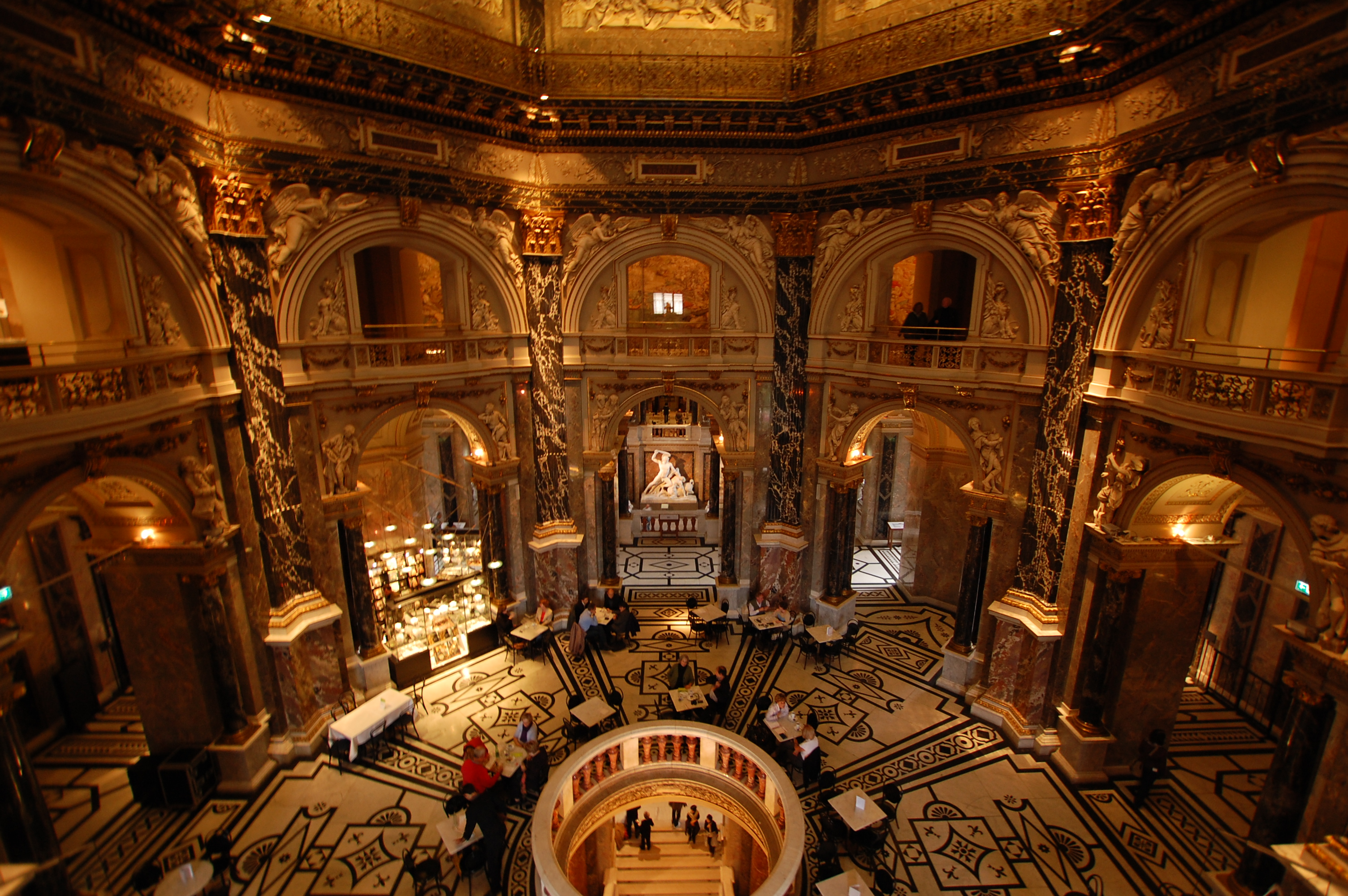
Rotunda

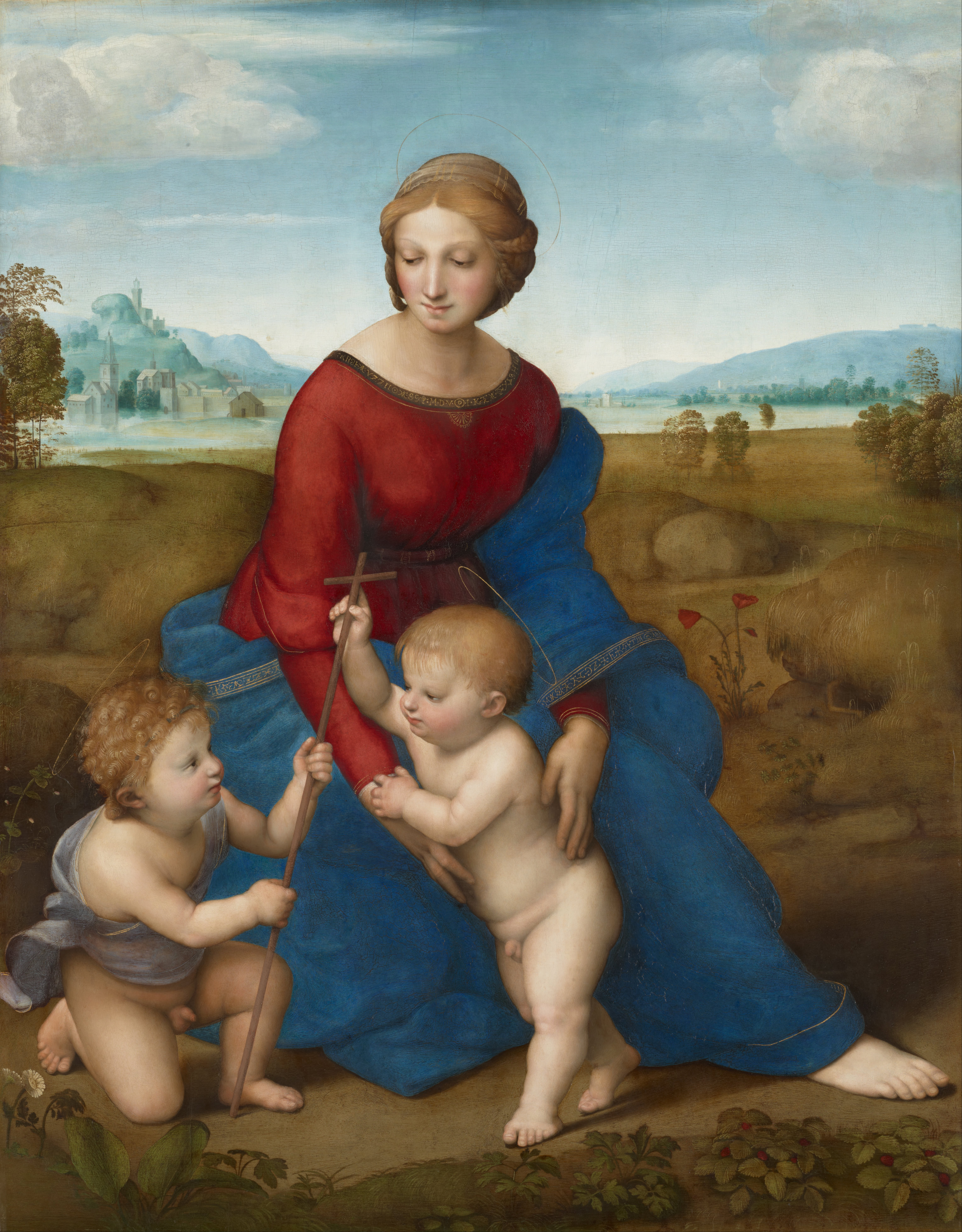
Madonna of the Meadow by Raphael, 1506

Tower of Babel by Pieter Bruegel the Elder, c. 1563

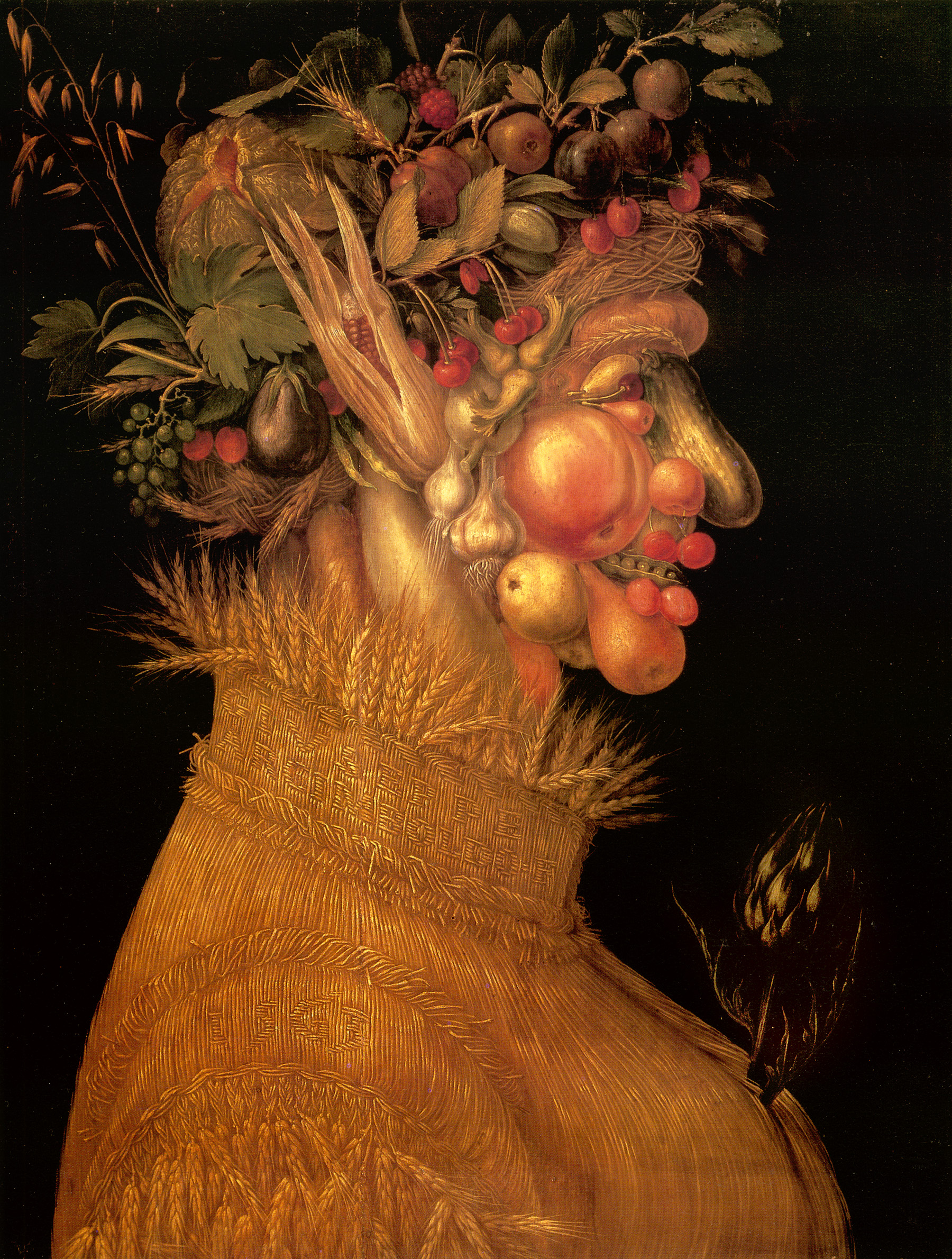
Summer, by Giuseppe Arcimboldo, 1563

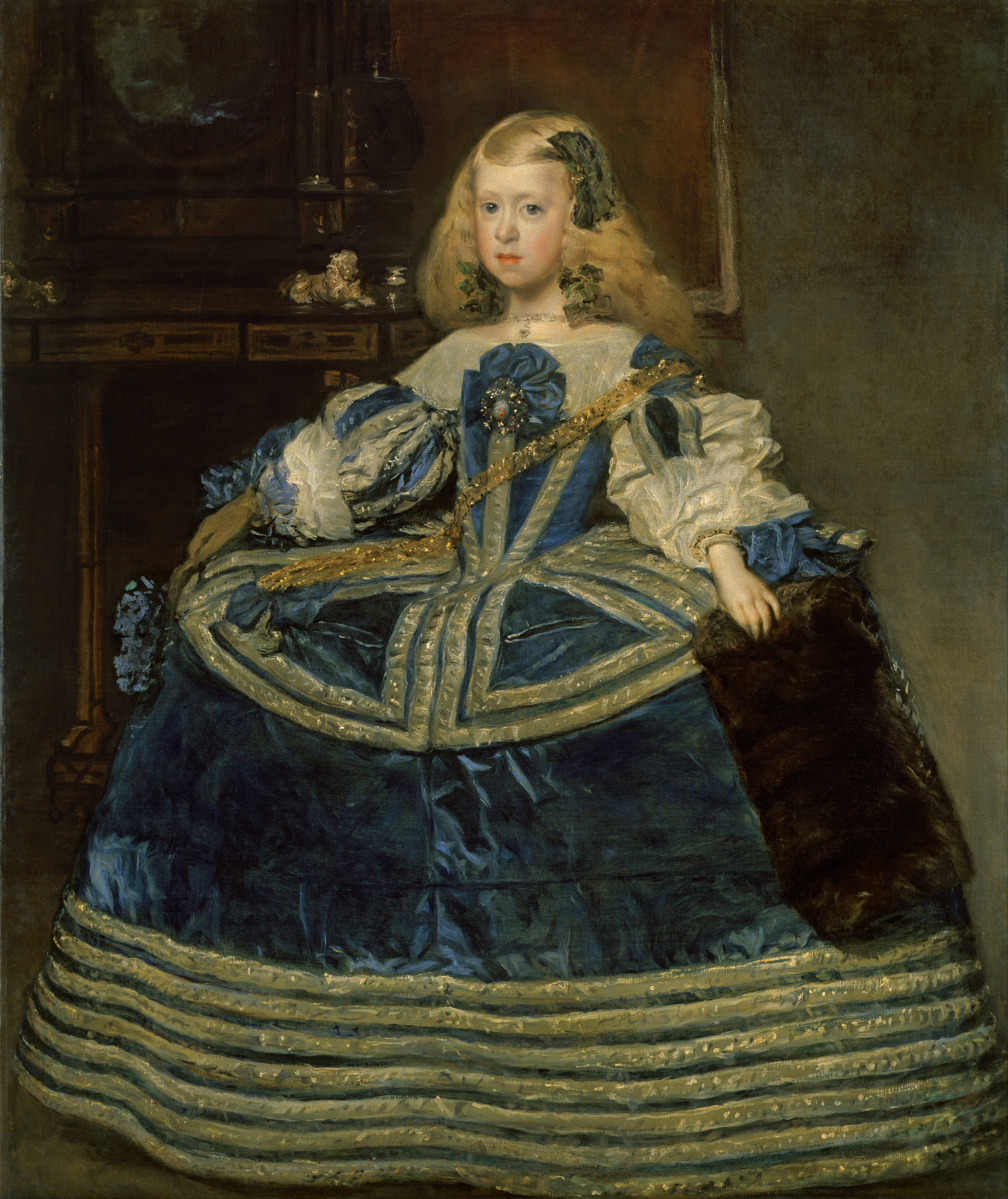
Infanta Margarita Teresa in a Blue Dress by Velázquez

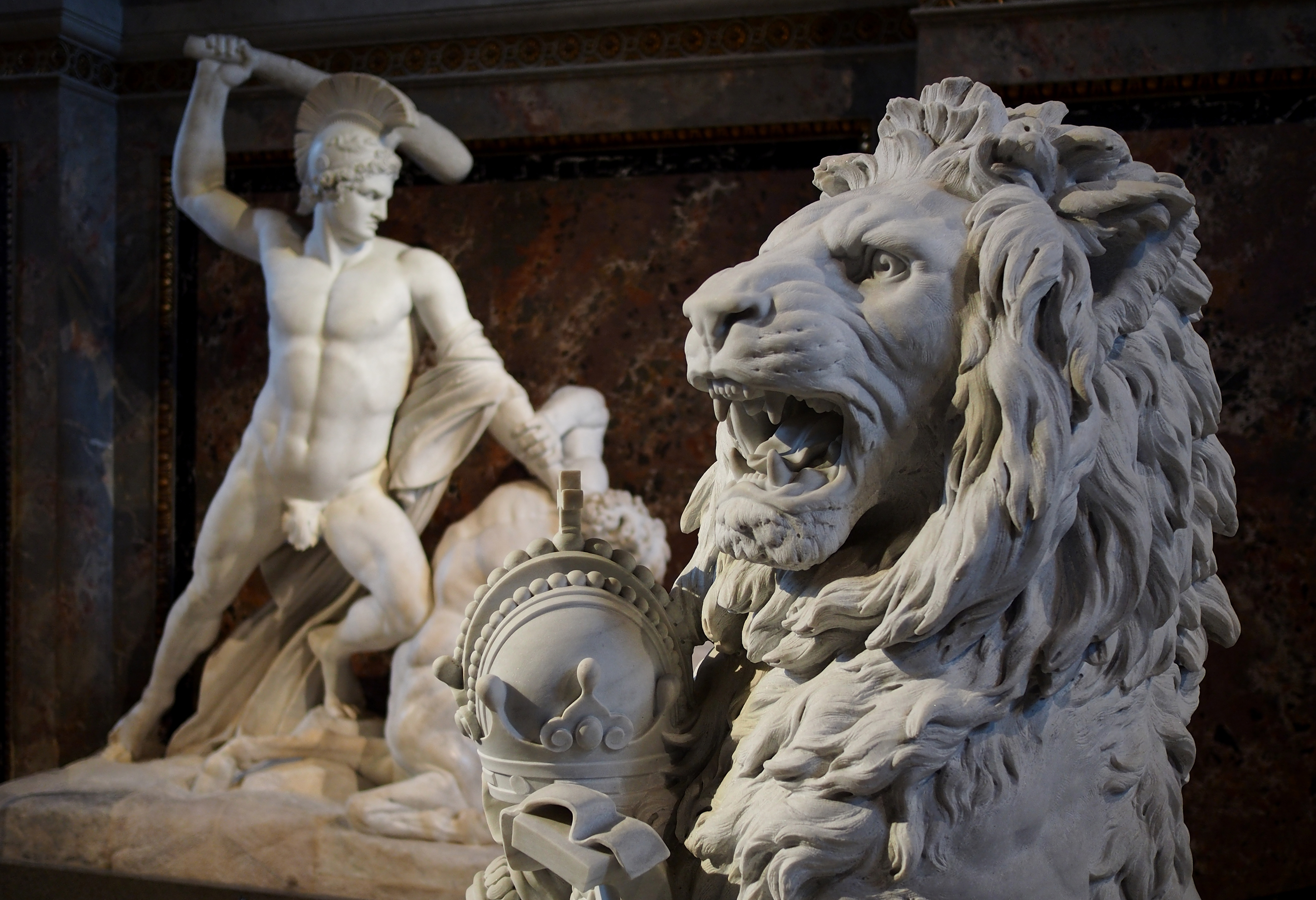
Sculptures at staircase

The Kunsthistorisches Museum Wien (lit. "Vienna Museum of Art History", often referred to as the "Museum of Fine Arts, Vienna") is an art museum in Vienna, Austria. Housed in its festive palatial building on the Vienna Ring Road, it is crowned with an octagonal dome. The term Kunsthistorisches Museum applies to both the institution and the main building. It is the largest art museum in the country.

Emperor Franz Joseph I of Austria-Hungary opened the facility around 1891 at the same time as the Natural History Museum, Vienna which has a similar design and is directly across Maria-Theresien-Platz. The two buildings were constructed between 1871 and 1891 according to plans by Gottfried Semper and Baron Karl von Hasenauer. The emperor commissioned the two Ringstraße museums to create a suitable home for the Habsburgs' formidable art collection and to make it accessible to the general public. The buildings are rectangular, with symmetrical Renaissance Revival façades of sandstone lined with large arched windows on the main levels and topped with octagonal domes 60 metres (200 ft) high. The interiors of the museums are lavishly decorated with marble, stucco ornamentation, gold-leaf, and murals. The grand stairway features paintings by Gustav Klimt, Ernst Klimt, Franz Matsch, Hans Makart and Mihály Munkácsy.

== Collection ==
=== Picture gallery ===
The museum's primary collections are those of the Habsburgs, particularly from the portrait and armour collections of Ferdinand of Tirol, the collections of Emperor Rudolph II (the largest part of which is, however, scattered), and the collection of paintings of Archduke Leopold Wilhelm, of which his Italian paintings were first documented in the Theatrum Pictorium.

Notable works in the picture gallery include:

- Jan van Eyck: Portrait of Cardinal Niccolò Albergati (c. 1431)
- Antonello da Messina: San Cassiano Altarpiece (1475–1476)
- Raphael:
  - Madonna of the Meadow (1506)
  - St Margaret and the Dragon (1518)
- Albrecht Dürer:
  - Avarice (1507)
  - Adoration of the Trinity (1511)
- Titian:
  - The Bravo (1516–17)
  - Portrait of Isabella d'Este (1534–1536)
- Lorenzo Lotto: Madonna and Child with Saint Catherine and Saint James (c. 1527)
- Tintoretto: Susanna and the Elders (1555–56)
- Pieter Brueghel the Elder:
  - The Fight Between Carnival and Lent (1559)
  - Children's Games (1560)
  - The Tower of Babel (1563)
  - The Procession to Calvary (1564)
  - The Gloomy Day (February - March) (1565)
  - The Return of the Herd (October - November) (1565)
  - The Hunters in the Snow (December - January) (1565)
  - The Peasant and the Nest Robber (Bauer und Vogeldieb), 1568
  - The Peasant Wedding (1568/69)
  - The Peasant Dance (1568/69)
- Giuseppe Arcimboldo:
  - The Four Seasons
    - Summer (1563)
    - Winter (1563)
- Caravaggio:
  - The Crowning with Thorns (c. 1602–1604)
  - Madonna of the Rosary (1606–07)
  - David with the Head of Goliath
- Peter Paul Rubens:
  - Miracles of St. Francis Xavier
  - Angelica and the Hermit (1626–1628)
  - Ildefonso Altarpiece (1630–1632)
  - Self-Portrait (1638–39)
  - The Fur (1638)
- Rembrandt: Self Portrait (1652)
- Ciro Ferri: Ananias Curing Saul's Blindness (1660)
- Johannes Vermeer: The Art of Painting (1665–66)
- Diego Velázquez: Several portraits of the Spanish royal family, a branch of the Habsburg, sent to Vienna.
- Adrien Manglard: Seestück; Seehafen
- Thomas Gainsborough: Landscape in Suffolk (1748; currently not on display)

The collections of the Kunsthistorisches Museum:

- Egyptian and Near Eastern Collection
- Collection of Greek and Roman Antiquities
- Collection of Sculpture and Decorative Arts
- Coin Collection
- Library

=== Hofburg ===
- Ephesus Museum
- Sammlung alter Musikinstrumente
- Imperial Armoury
- Archive
- Secular and Ecclesiastical Treasury (in the Schweizerhof)

=== Others ===
- Museum of Carriages and Department of Court Uniforms (in Schönbrunn Palace)
- Collections of Ambras Castle (in Innsbruck)
- the Austrian Theatre Museum in Palais Lobkowitz

Also affiliated are the:

- Museum of Ethnology in the Neue Burg (affiliated in 2001);
- Lipizzaner-Museum in the Stallburg

== Nazi-looted art ==
In 2010, an Austrian government panel recommended that the Kunsthistorisches Museum should restitute two altar panels by the 16th-century Dutch artist, Maerten van Heemskerck to the heirs of Richard Neumann, a Jewish art collector in Vienna plundered by the Nazis.

In 2015, a dispute over a painting by Pieter Bruegel the Elder, The Fight Between Carnival and Lent (1559), erupted between Poland and Austria. Poland presented evidence that the painting had been seized by Charlotte von Wächter, the wife of Krakow's Nazi governor Otto von Wächter, during the German occupation of Poland. The Kunsthistorisches Museum, insisted that it had owned the painting since the 17th century, and that the artwork seized by von Wächter in 1939 "was a different painting".

== Recent events ==
One of the museum's most important objects, the Cellini Salt Cellar sculpture by Benvenuto Cellini, was stolen on 11 May 2003 and recovered on 21 January 2006, in a box buried in a forest near the town of Zwettl. It was featured in an episode of Museum Secrets on the History Channel. It had been the greatest art theft in Austrian history.

The museum is the subject of Johannes Holzhausen's documentary film The Great Museum (2014), filmed over two years in the run up to the re-opening of the newly renovated and expanded Kunstkammer rooms in 2013.

In 2016, to mark the 125 years of the museum, the Austrian artists duo Arotin & Serghei created the giant digital composition, Infinite Screen–The Tower of Babel, projected on the 1200 sq m main façade. The famous painting by Pieter Brueghel the Elder inside the museum was transformed into a radar like rotating structure of light cells in continuous mutation, with emerging details of myths of the origins of humanity and from the KHM collection.

From October 2018 through January 2019 the museum hosted the world's largest-ever exhibition of works by Pieter Bruegel the Elder called Bruegel – Once in a Lifetime.

== Gallery ==
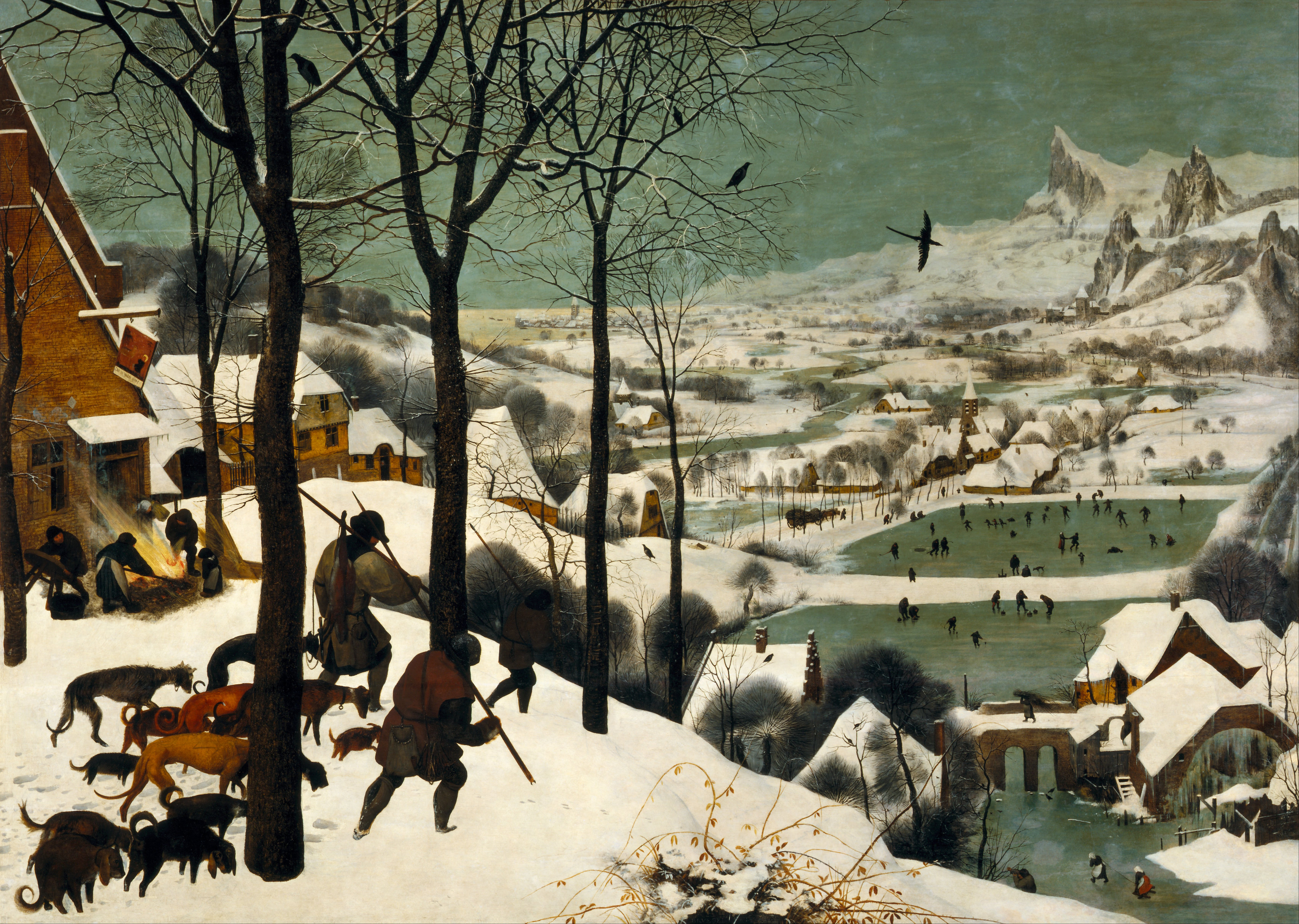
The Hunters in the Snow by Pieter Bruegel the Elder

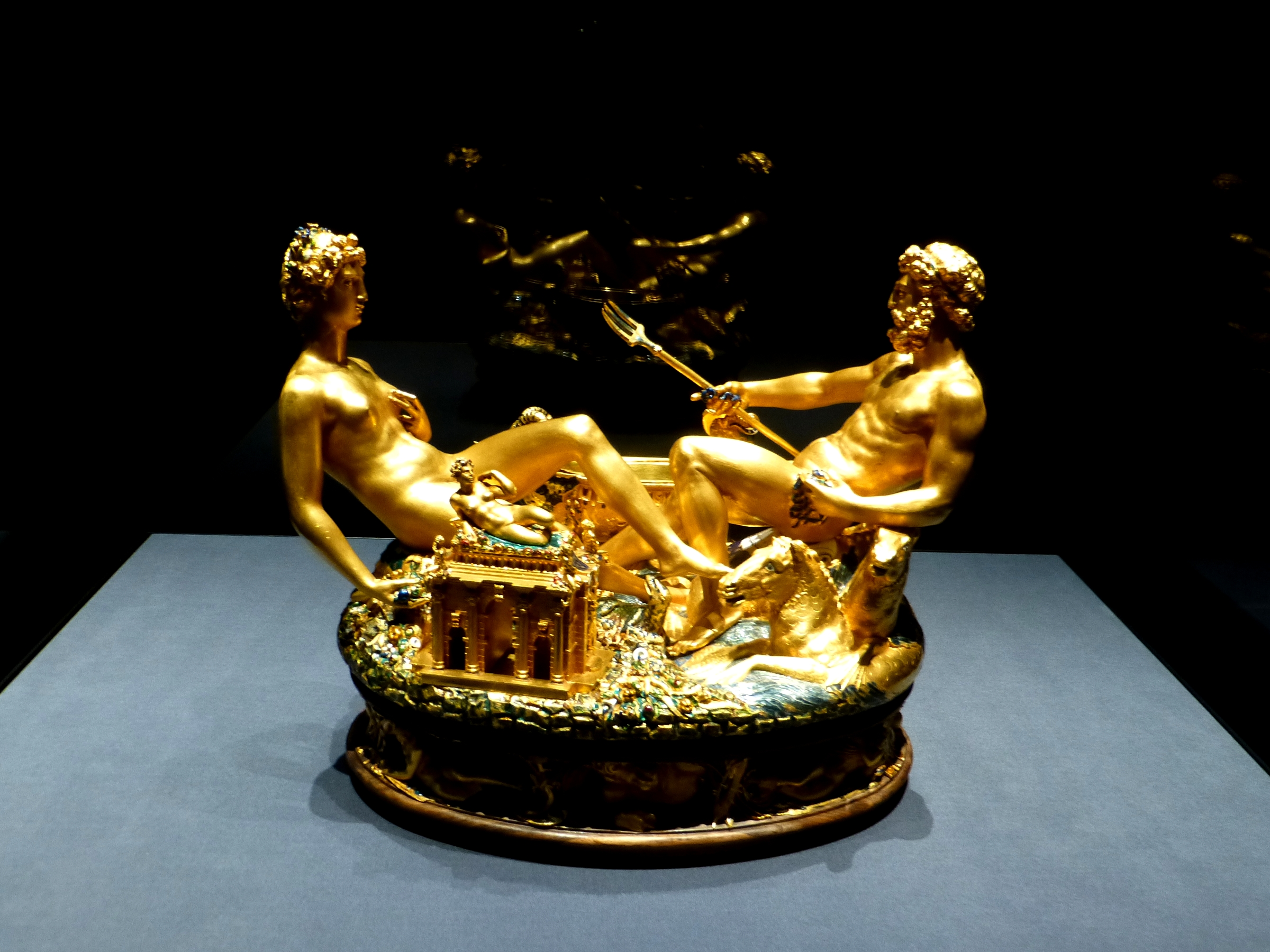
Cellini Salt Cellar

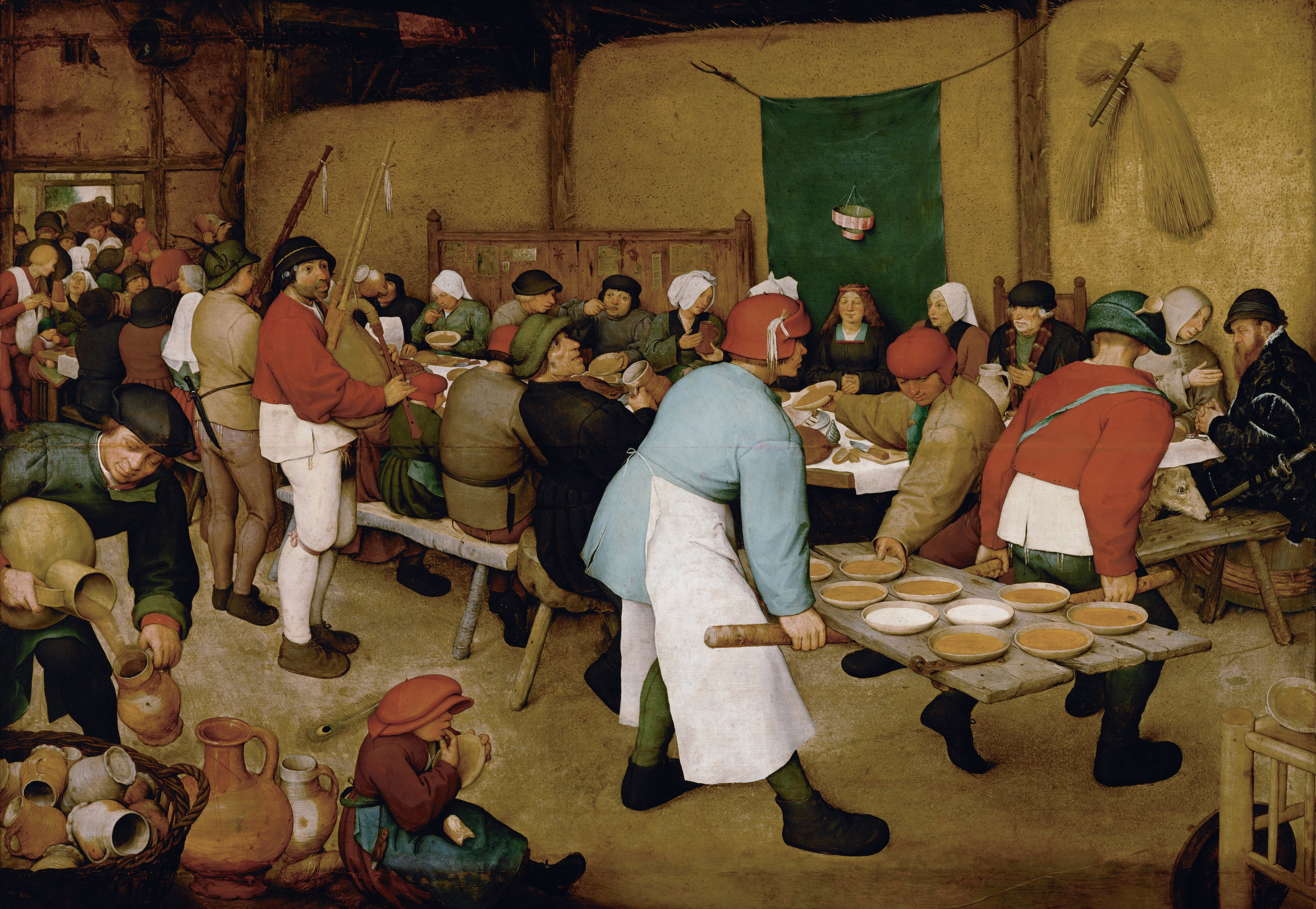
Pieter Bruegel the Elder's The Peasant Wedding

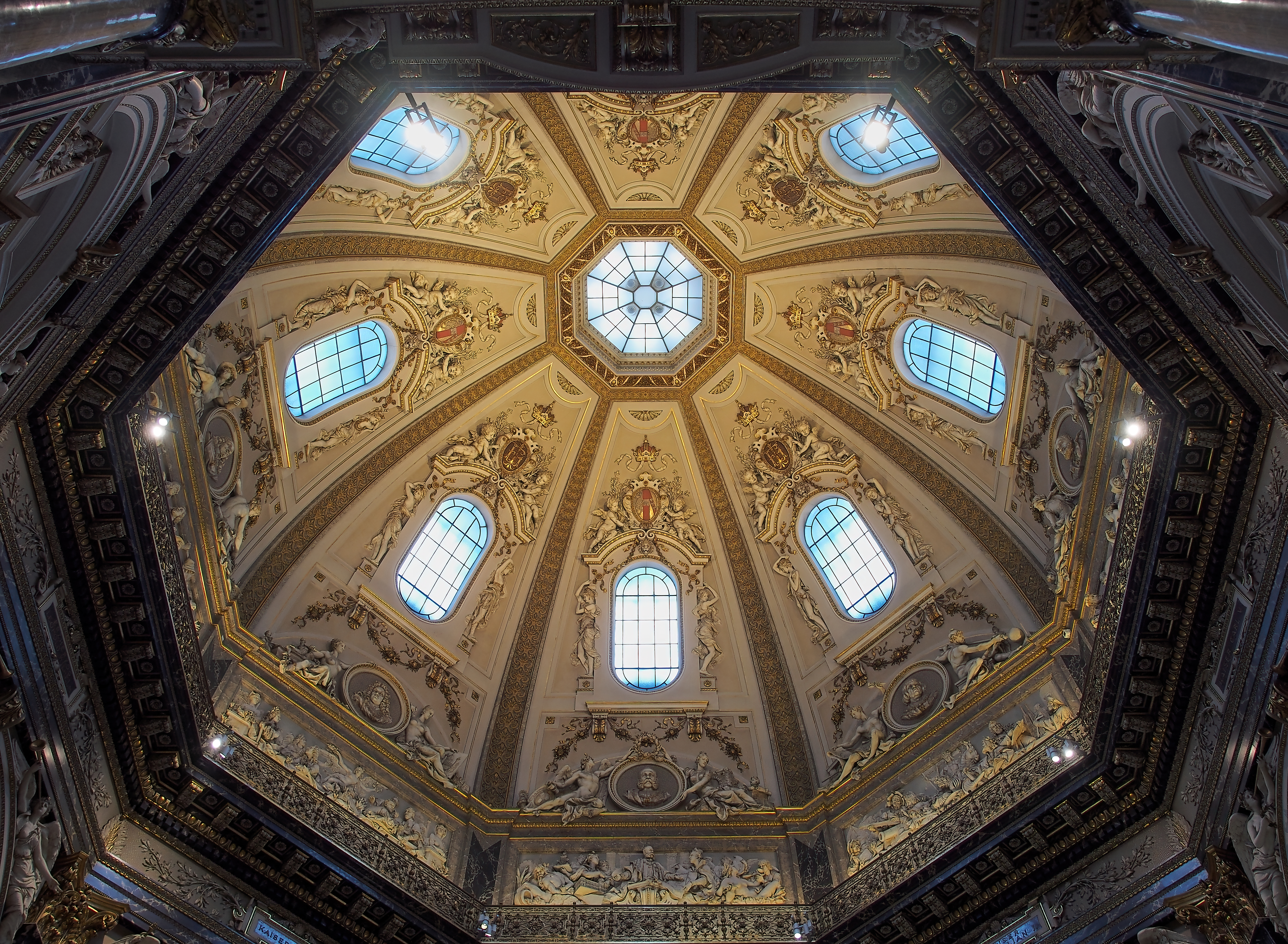
Cupola of museum

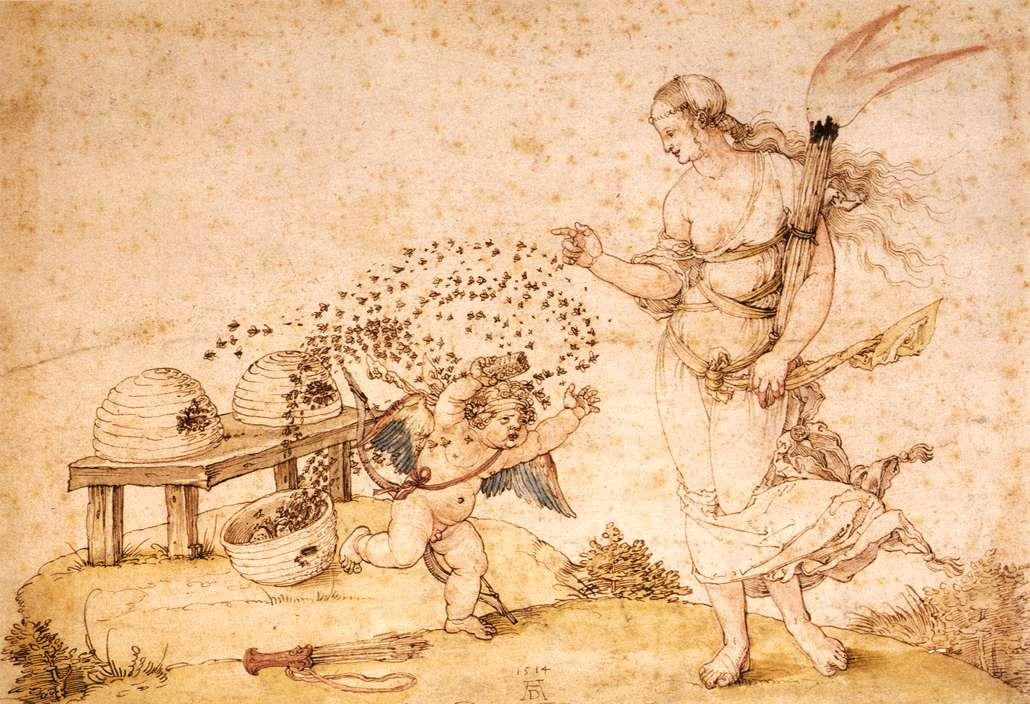
Cupid the Honey Thief, drawing by Albrecht Dürer

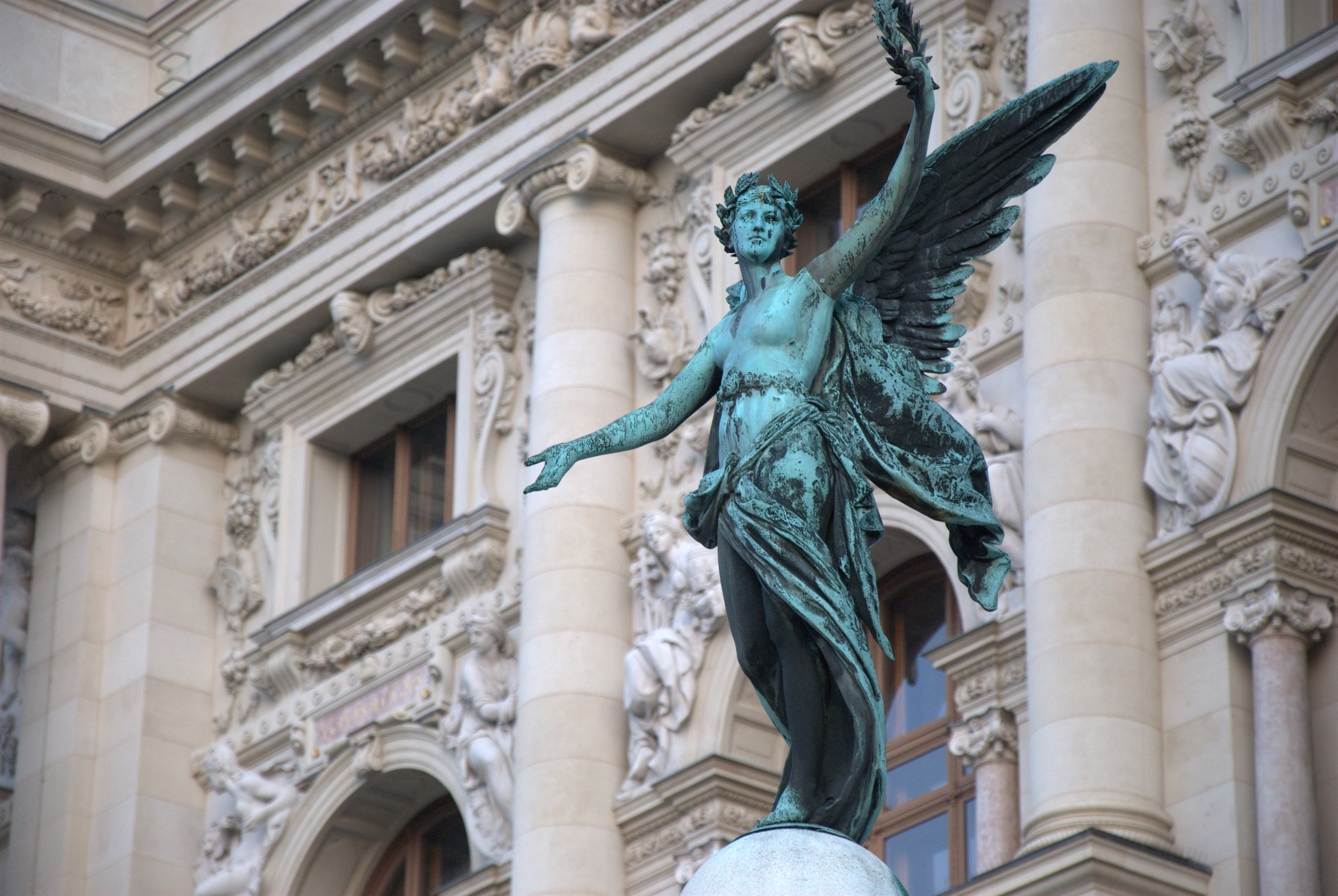
Statue outside the Kunsthistorisches Museum

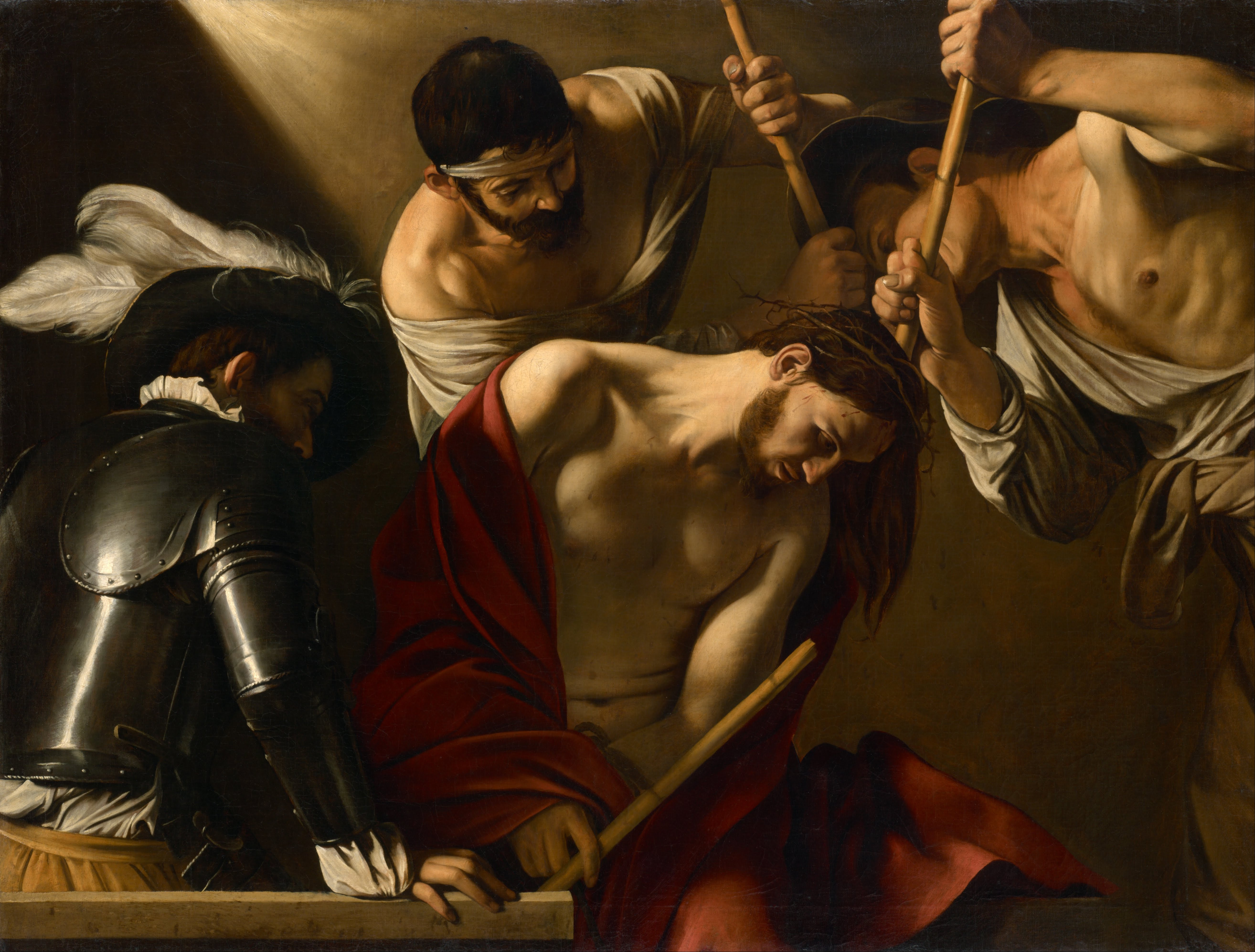
The Crowning with Thorns by Caravaggio

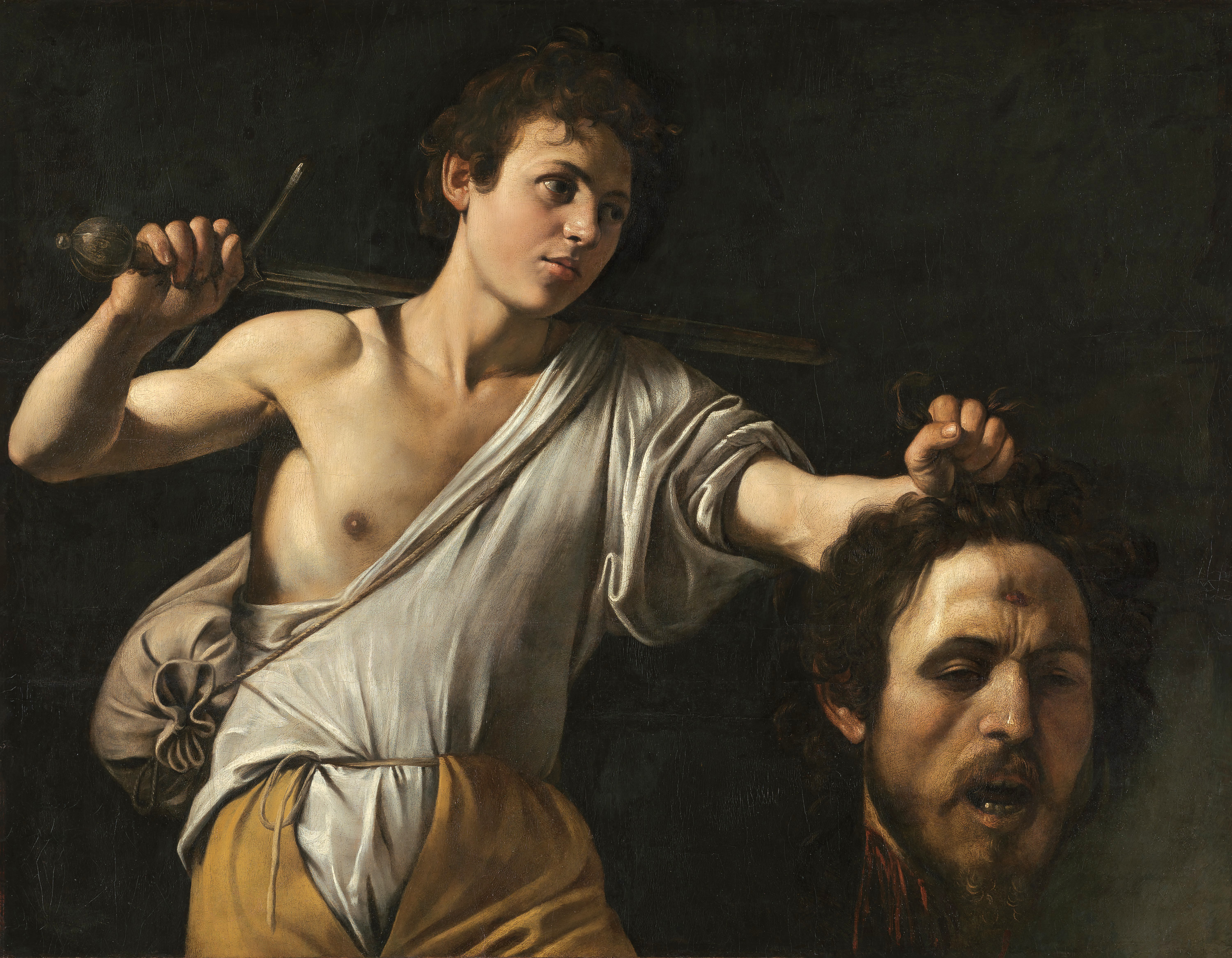
David with the Head of Goliath by Caravaggio

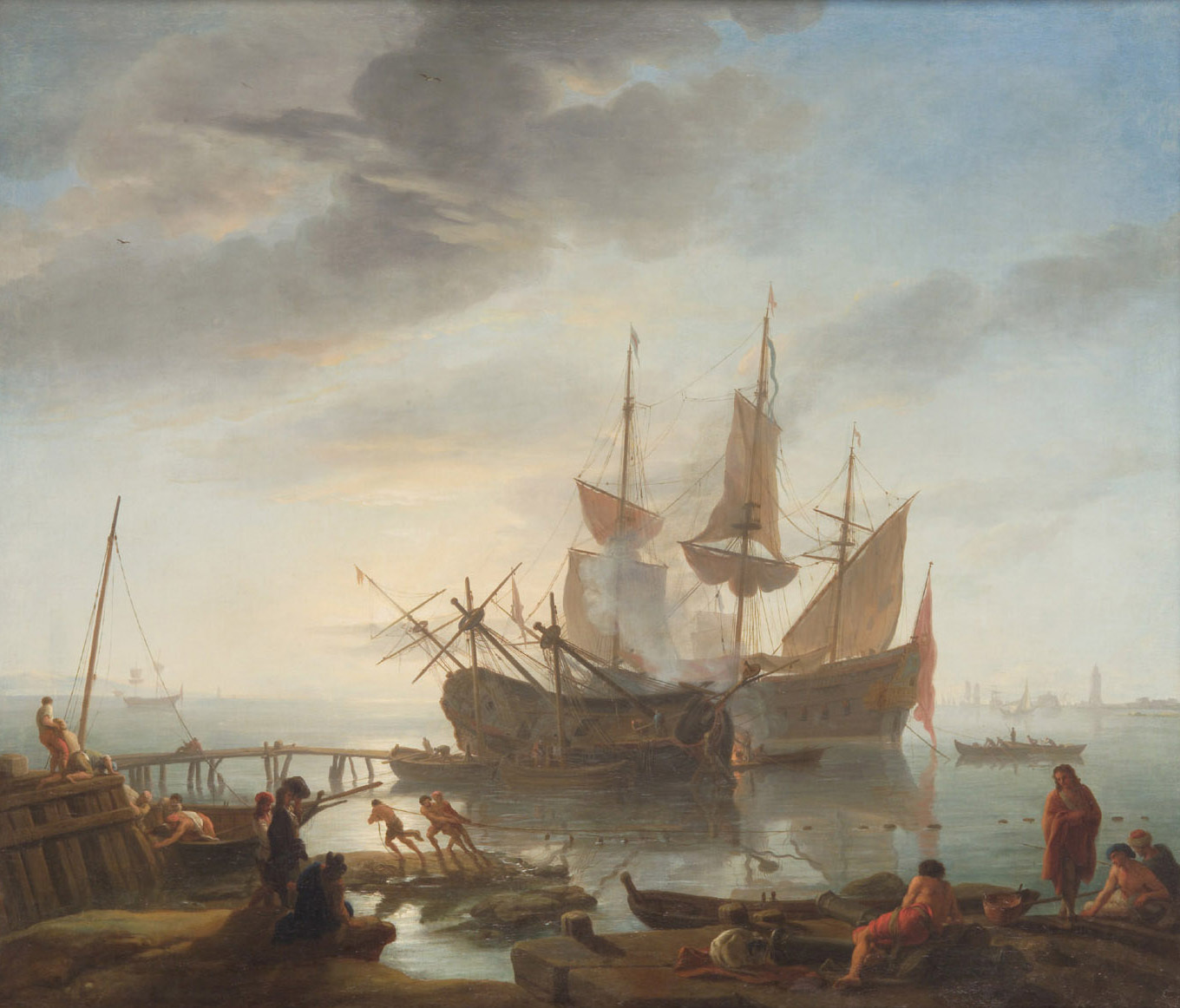
Seestück by Adrien Manglard

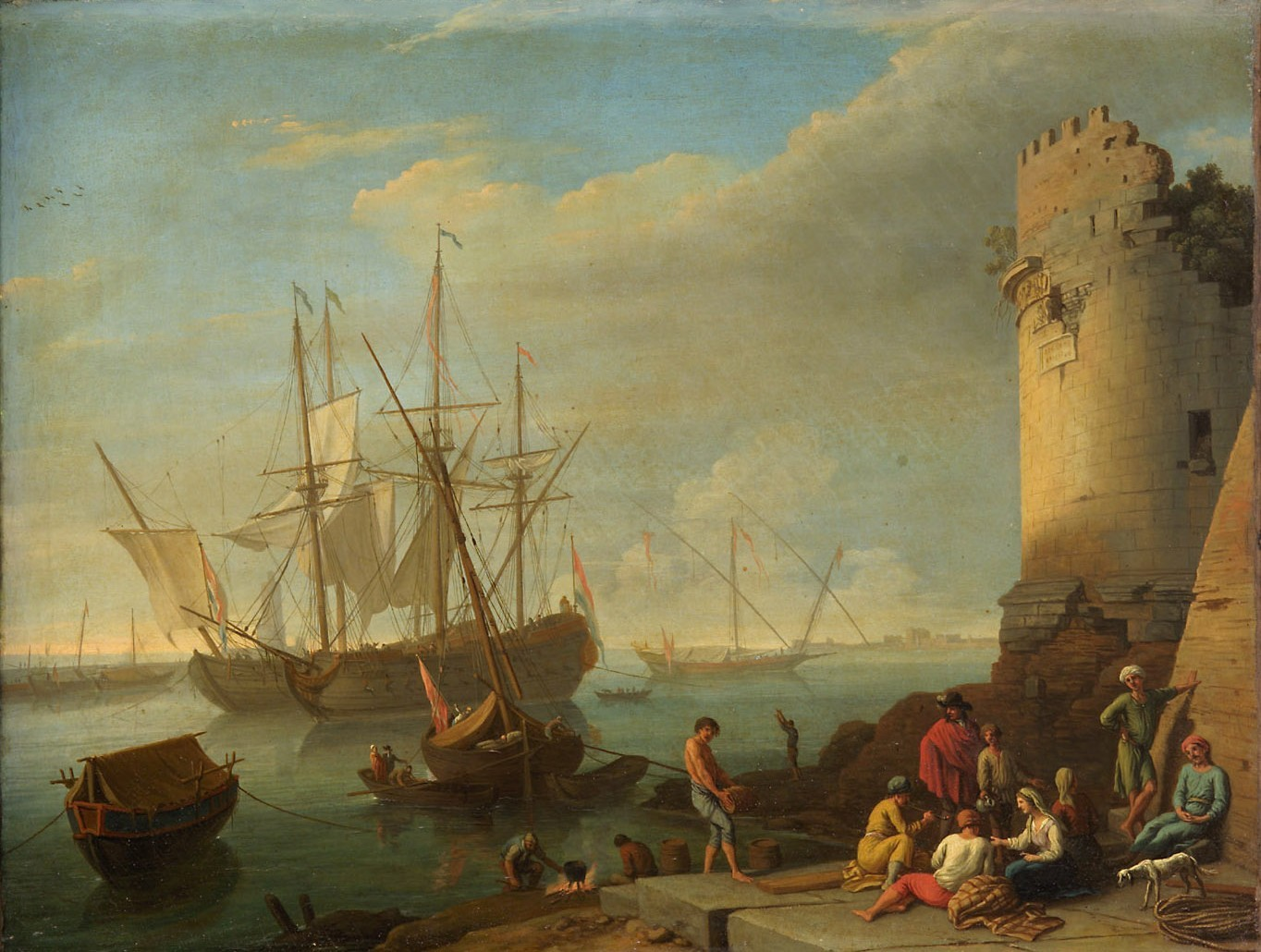
Seehafen by Adrien Manglard
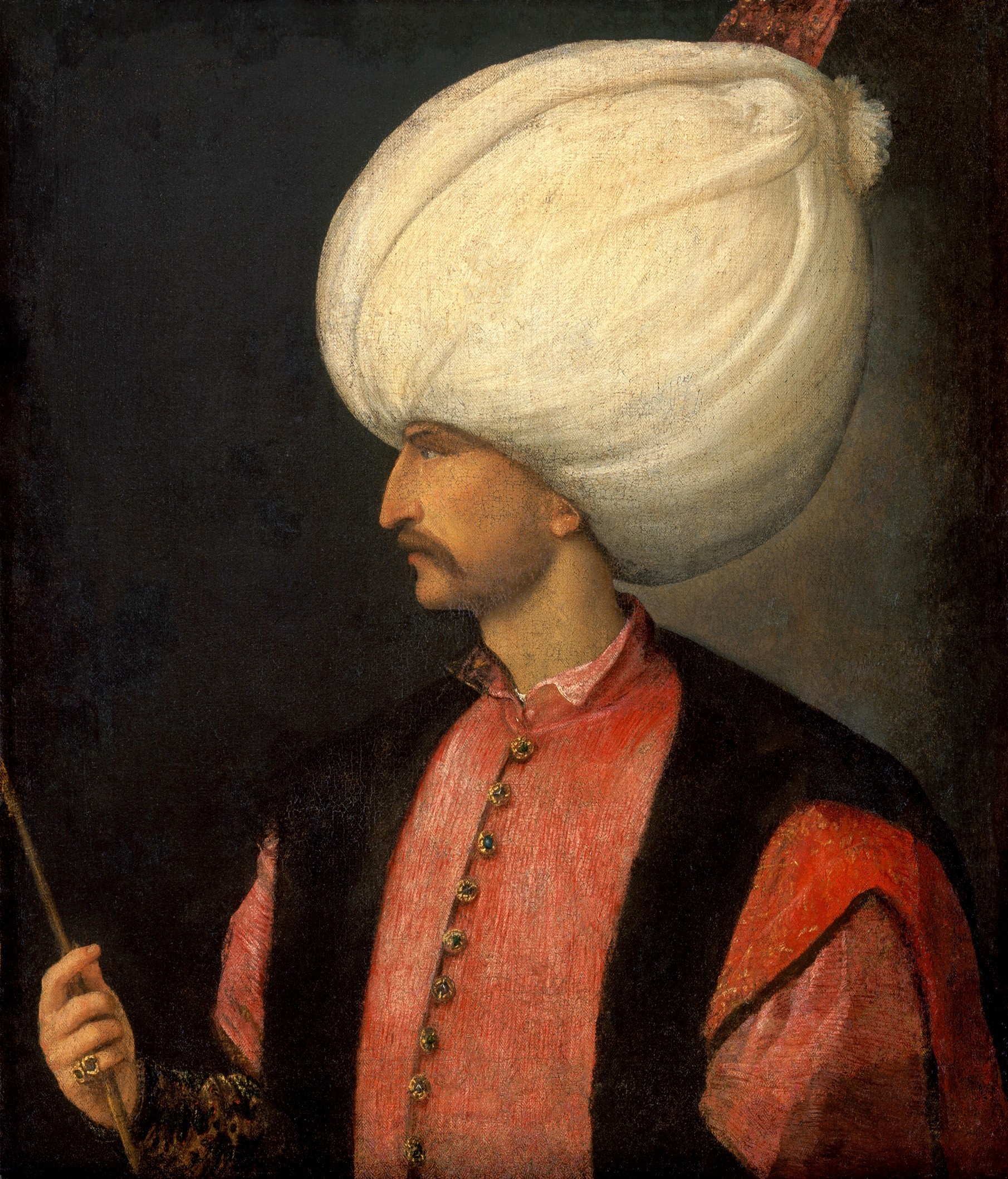
Suleiman the Magnificent by Titian

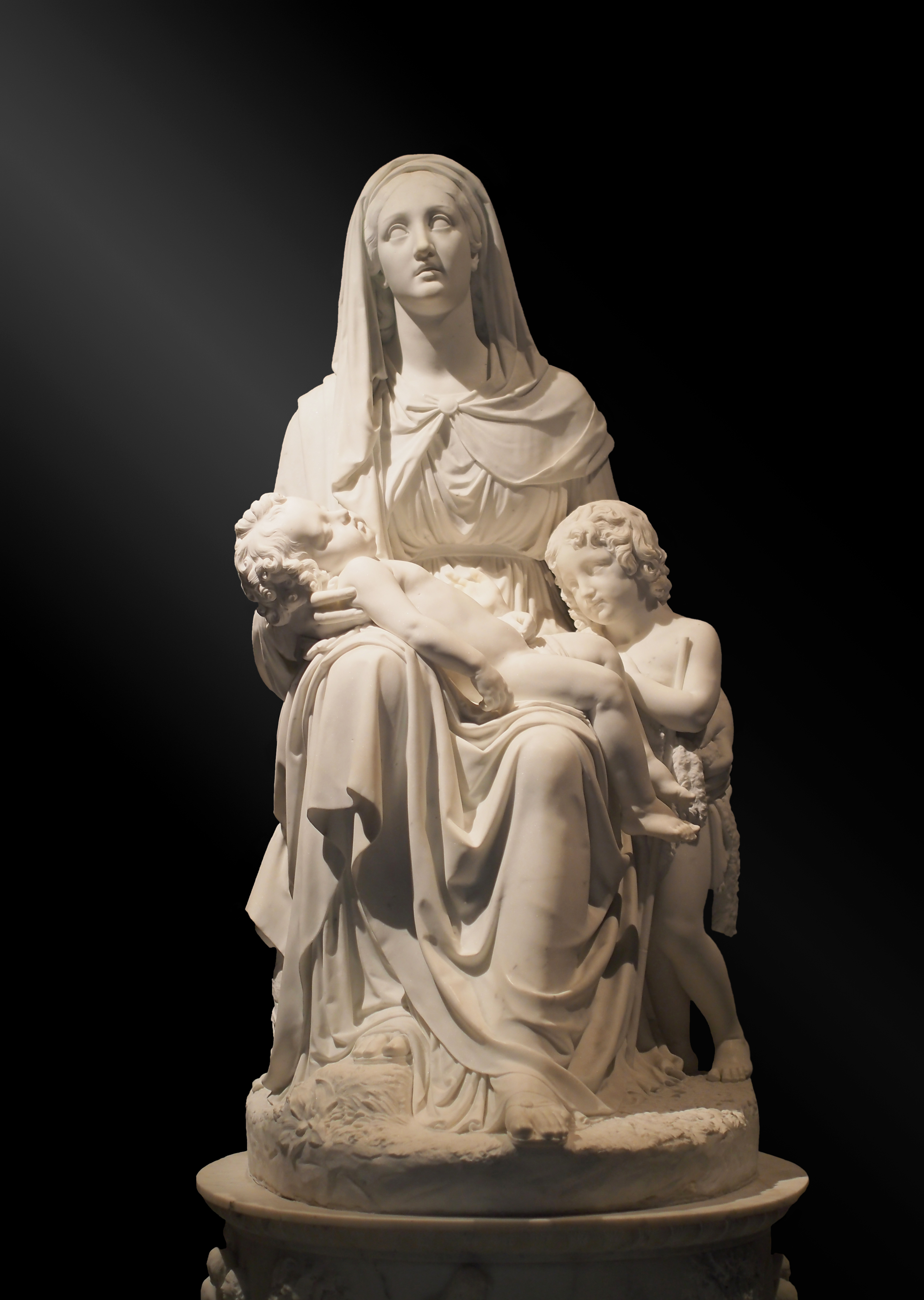
Madonna with child and St John by Benedetto Cacciatori

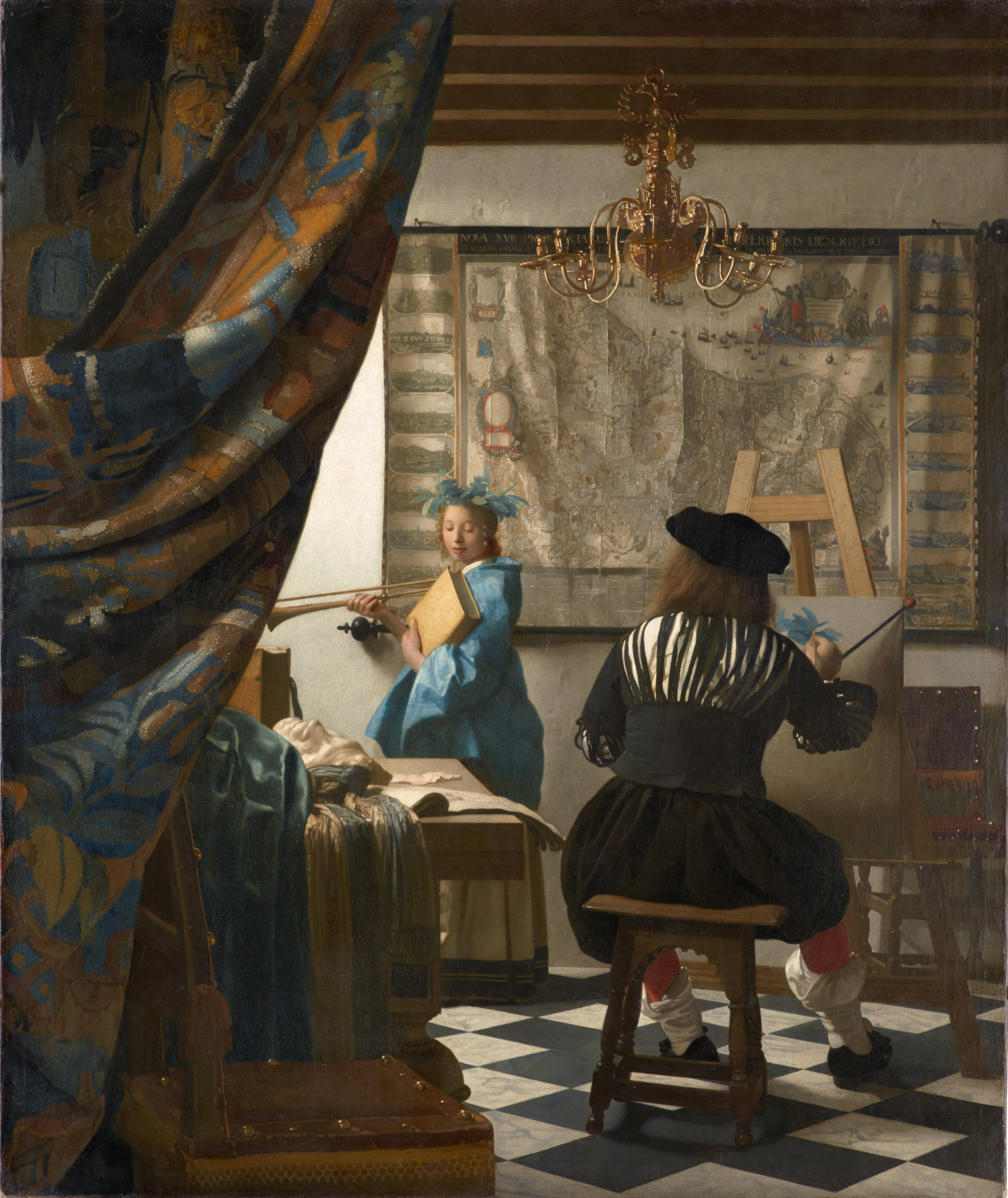
Johannes Vermeer's The Art of Painting

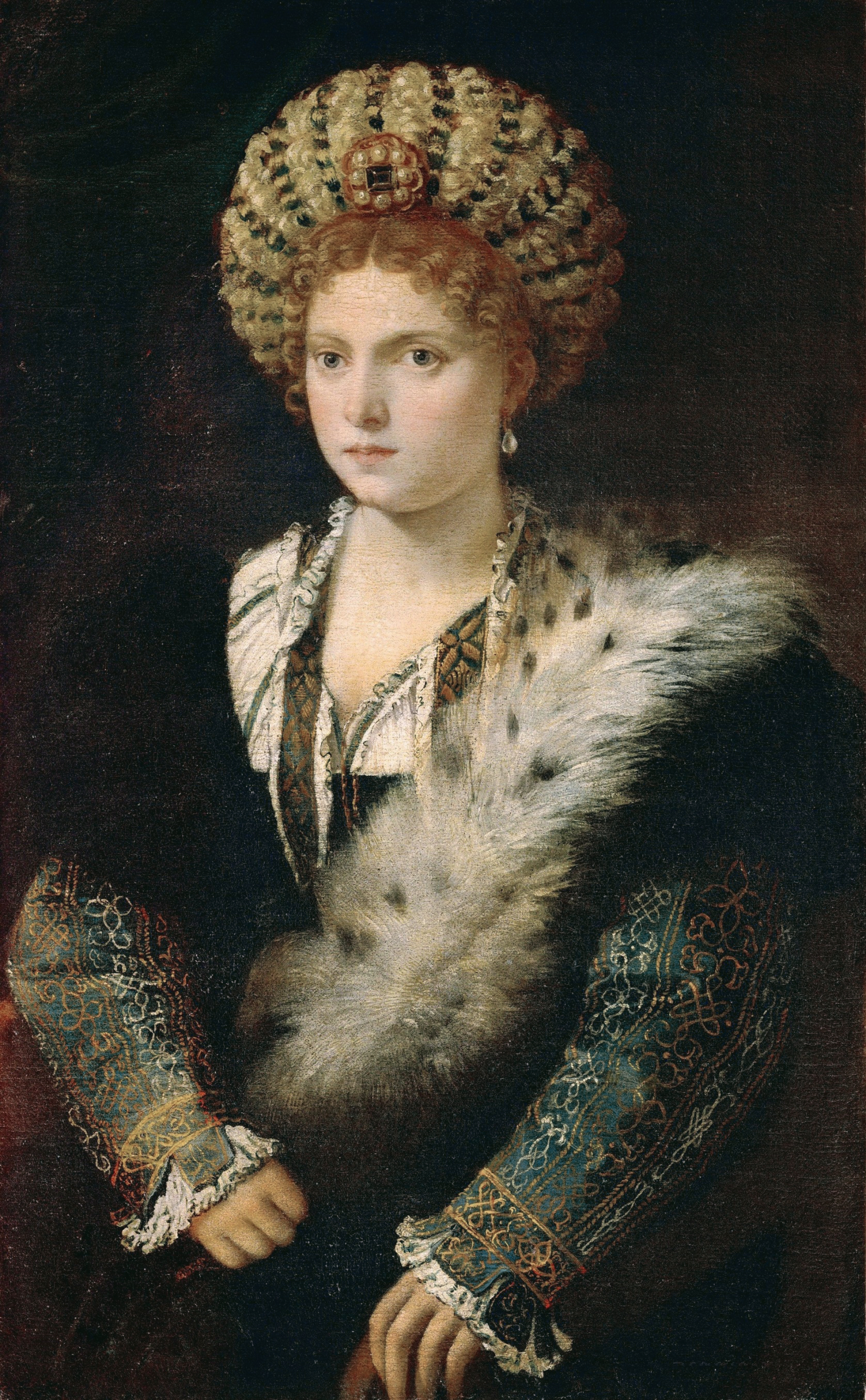
Portrait of Isabella d'Este by Titian

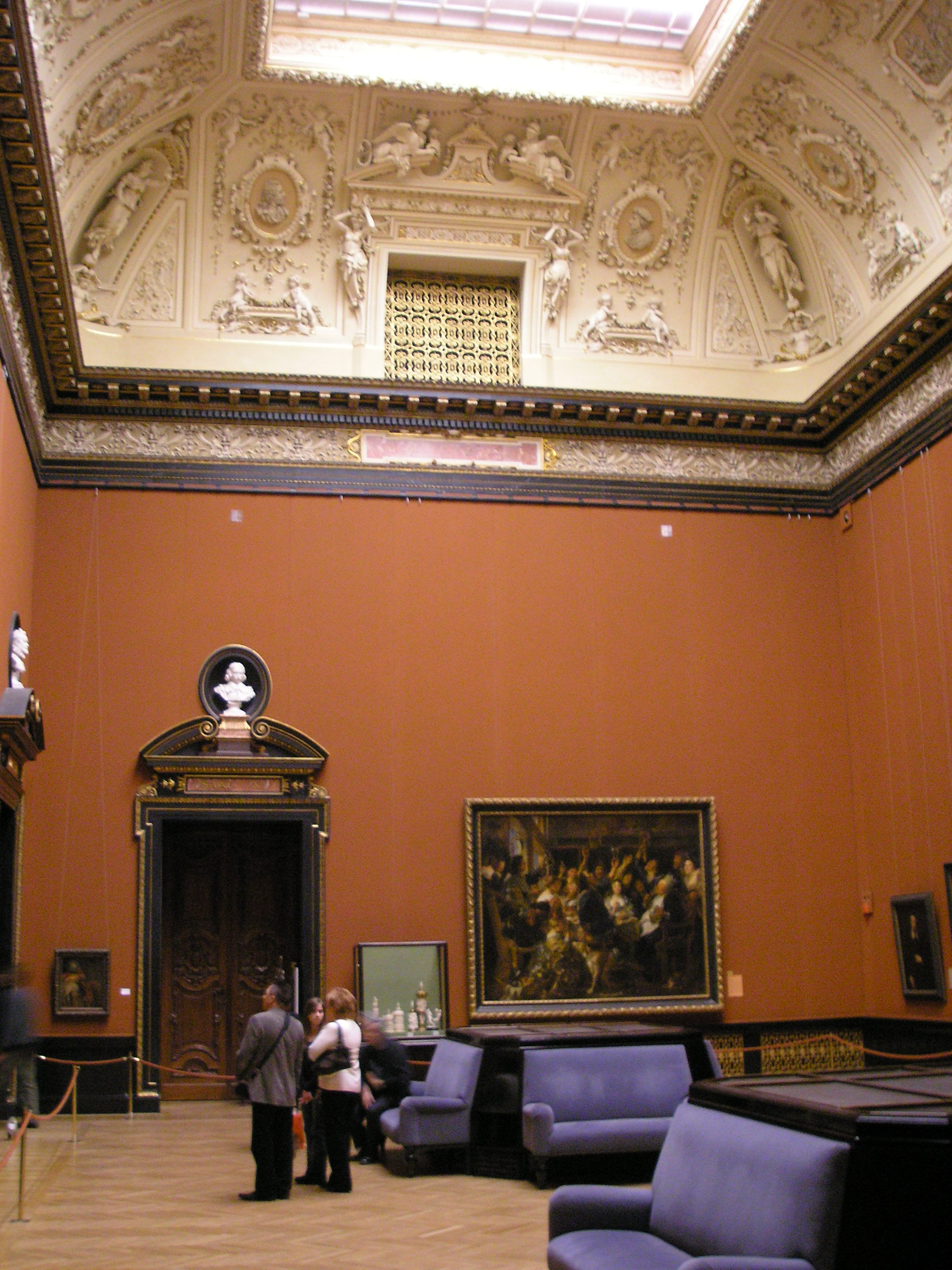
One of the galleries

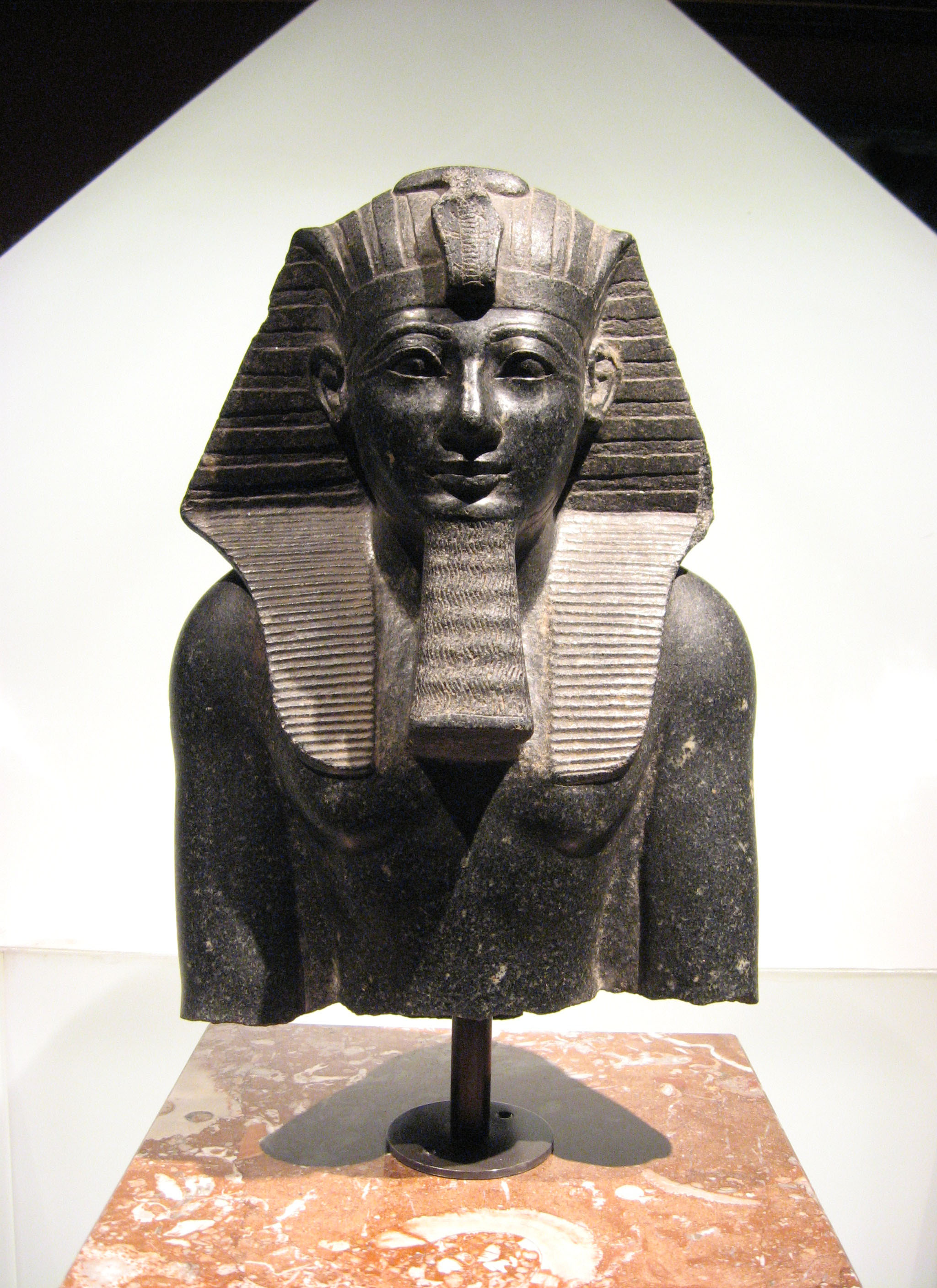
Statue of Thutmosis III

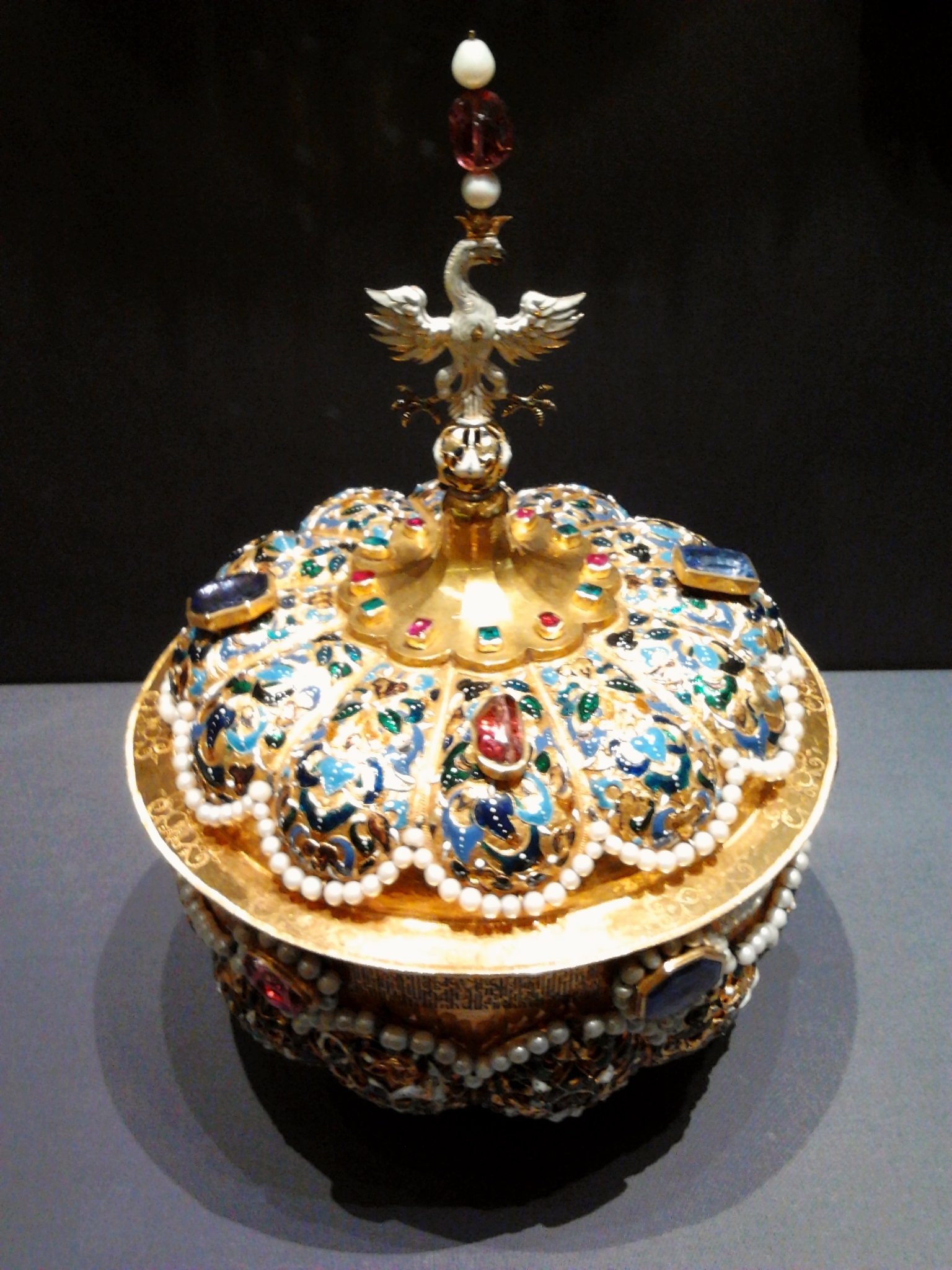
A loving cup of King Ladislaus IV of Poland

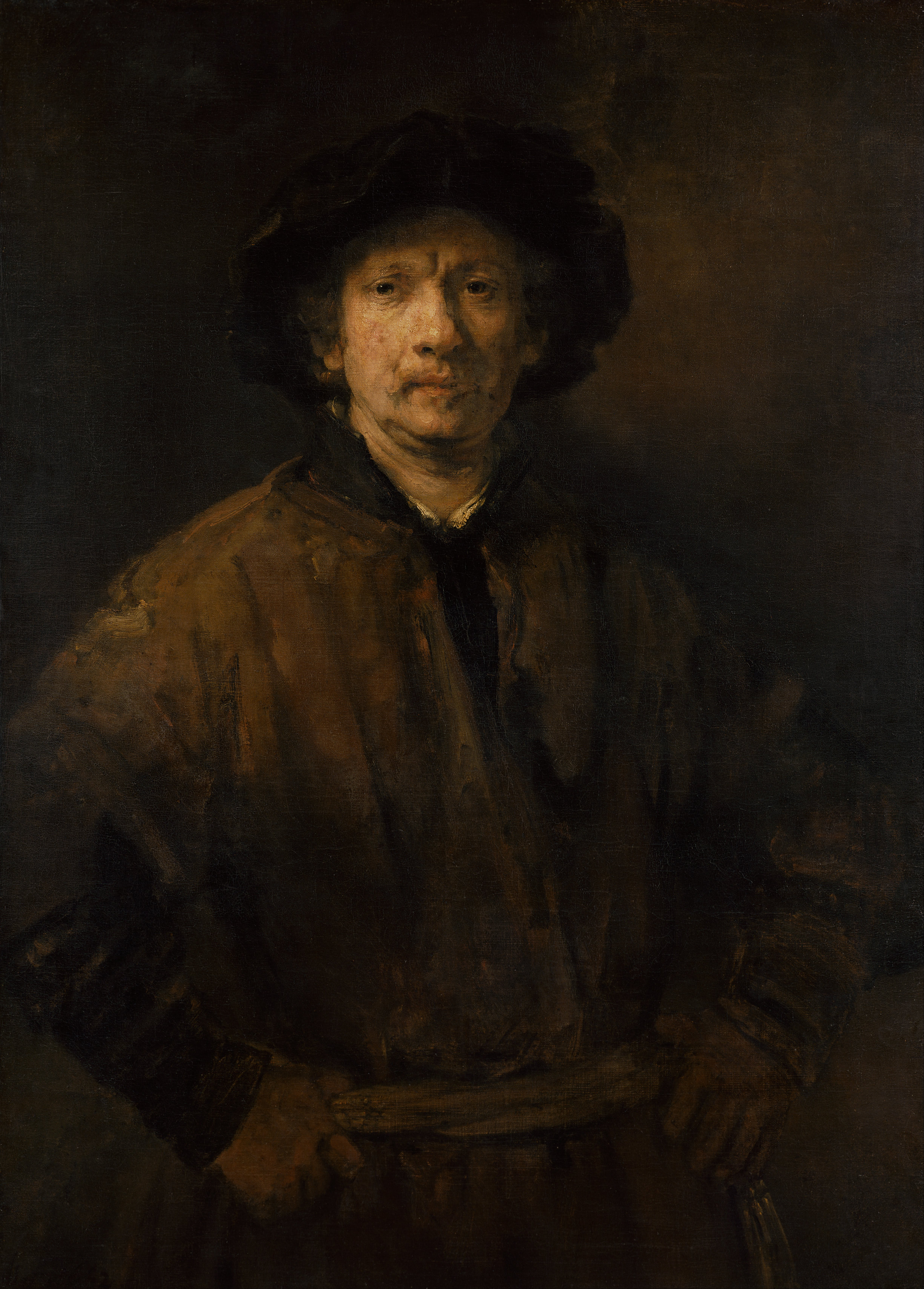
Self-portrait by Rembrandt

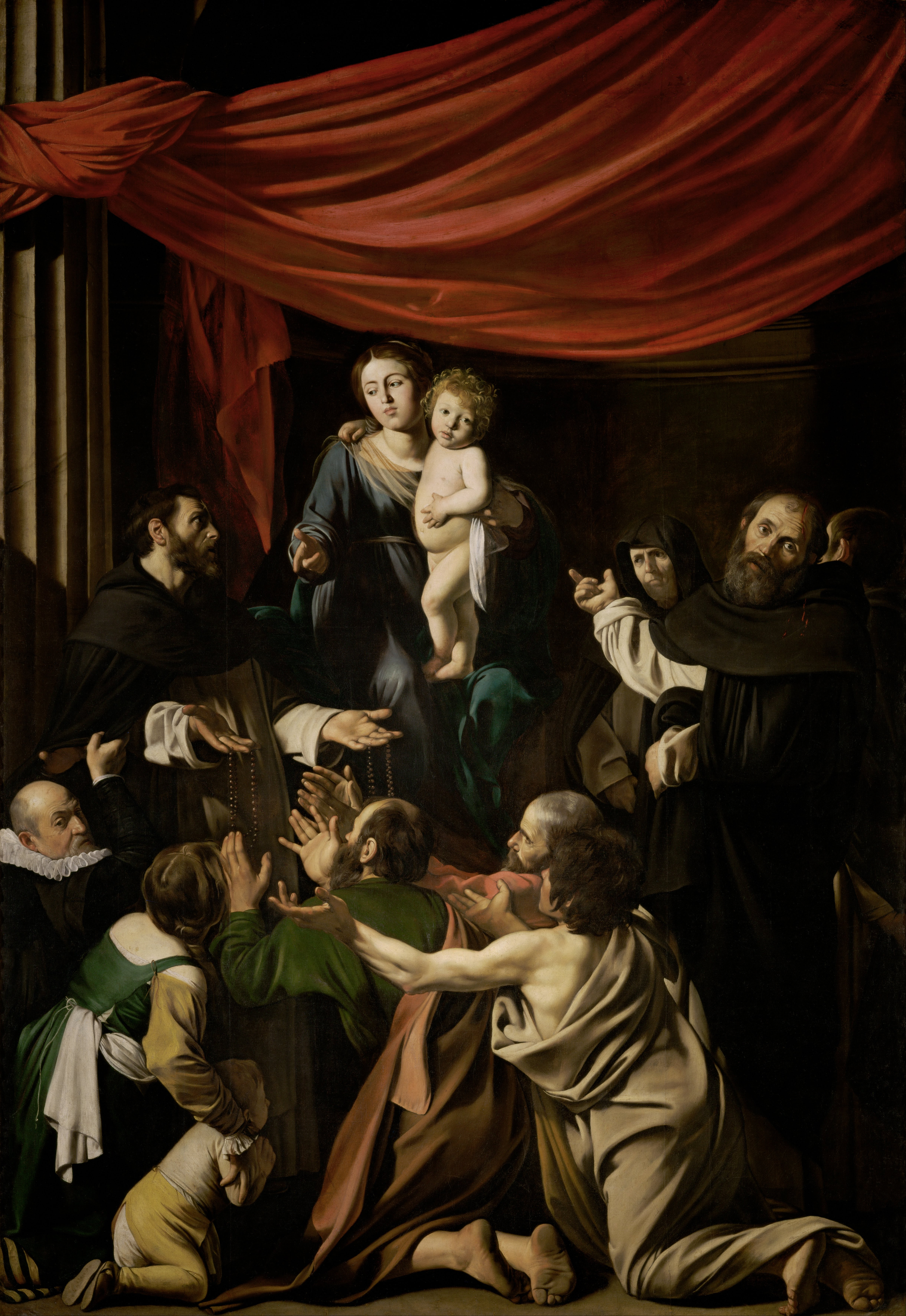
Madonna of the Rosary by Caravaggio

== See also ==
- Imperial Treasury, Vienna
- List of largest art museums
- Old Masters by Thomas Bernhard prominently features this museum
