= Camillo Gabrielli =

Italian painter (c. 1670 – 1730)

Camillo Gabrielli (c. 1670—1730) was an Italian painter of the late Baroque period.

He was born in Pisa. He was a pupil of Ciro Ferri. Lanzi states that he was the first who introduce the style of Pietro da Cortona among his countrymen. He painted some oil pictures at the Carmelites, and for private collections; but he was more distinguished for his fresco paintings, which were much esteemed. His principal work was the decorations of the great salon in the Palazzo Alliata in Forisportam and for the Palazzo del Consiglio dei Dodici in Pisa. He died in 1730. Among his pupils were Francesco and Giuseppe Melani.
