= Marziale Carpinoni =

Italian painter

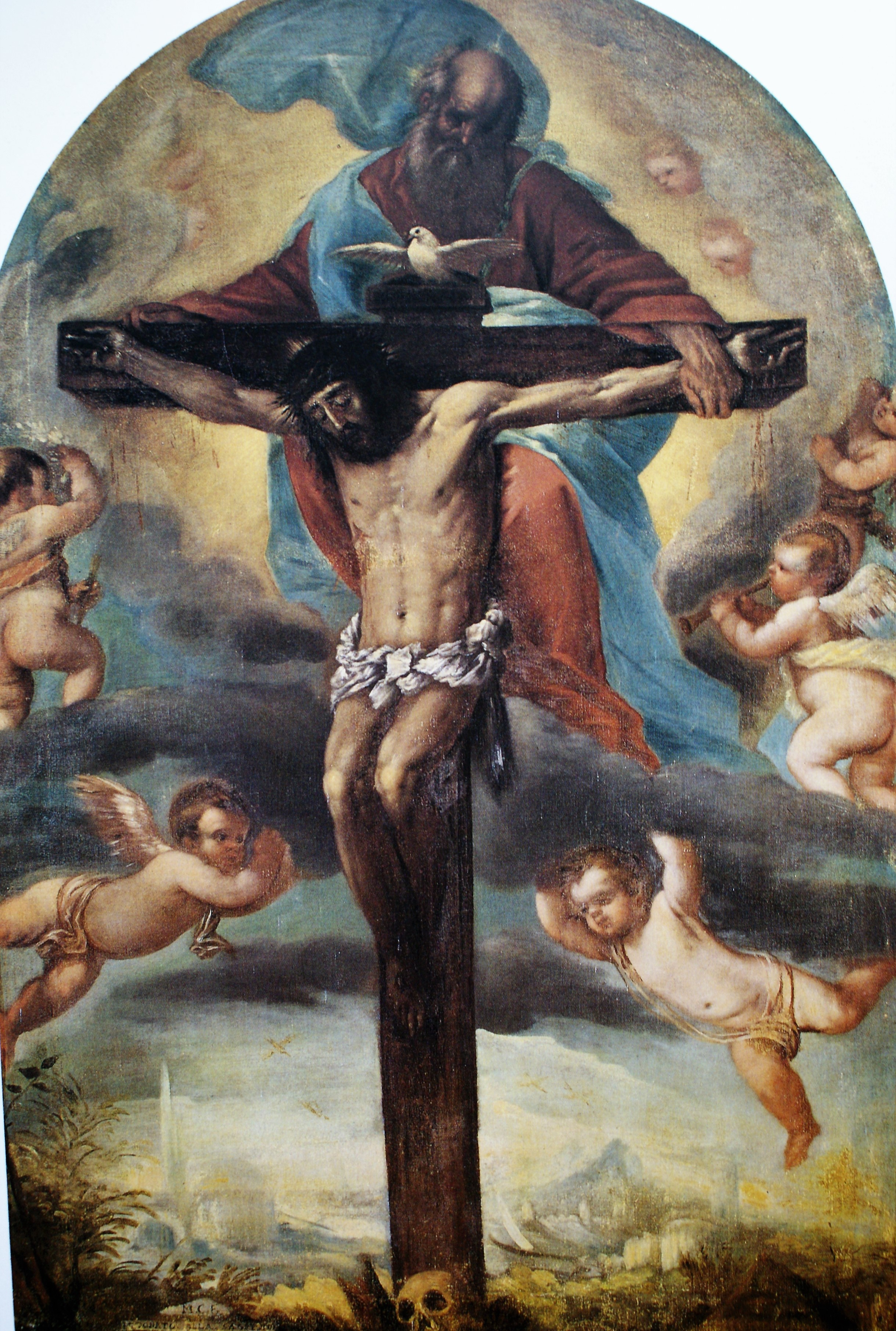
La Santissima Trinità ed angeli - Marziale Carpinoni

Marziale Carpinoni (c. 1644–1722) was an Italian painter of the Baroque period. Born in Clusone, he was the grandson of Domenico Carpinoni. Carpinoni received his initial training in art first by his father, then by his grandfather. He was afterwards sent to Rome to the school of Ciro Ferri. He painted historical subjects. In the principal church at Clusone is the Virgin and Child, with Saints and The Baptism of Christ by St. John. For the cathedral of Bergamo he painted images of SS. Domno, Domneone, and Eusebia. He also painted pictures for the churches in Brescia. He died at Ferrara.
