= Angelica and the Hermit =

Painting by Peter Paul Rubens

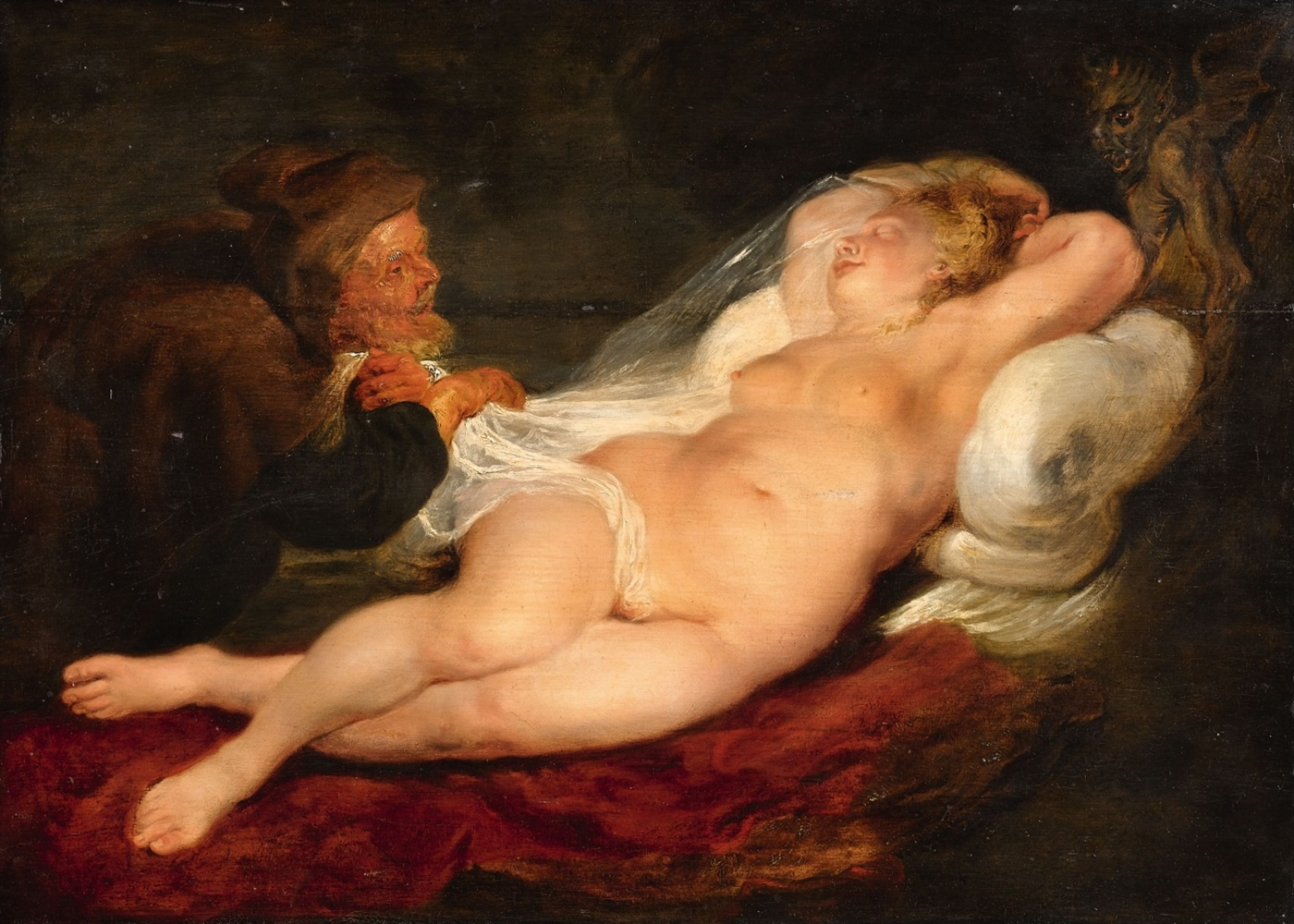
Angelica and the Hermit (1626–1628) by Rubens

Angelica and the Hermit is a 1626–1628 painting by Peter Paul Rubens. It shows an episode from canto 8 of Ludovico Ariosto's poem Orlando Furioso. It is now in the Kunsthistorisches Museum in Vienna.

== Context ==
The story of Angelica and the hermit is narrated in canto 8 of the epic poem Orlando furioso by the Italian poet Ludovico Ariosto, in the context of the war between Christians and Saracens, in the time of Charlemagne. Angélica and Orlando (El Caballero Roldán) are among the main characters.

Angelica is an extremely beautiful princess from Cathay with whom all the Christian knights fall in love, including Orlando. She is imprisoned in the court of Charlemagne but she escapes from the hands of the Christians and later falls in love with the shepherd Medoro. Orlando's passion for Angelica distracts him from his important task of defending Christianity, which was also Angelica's intention. He sets out in search of her and finally arrives by chance at the place where Angelica and Medoro have carved her names and declarations of love on the tree trunks. The unlucky gentleman loses his mind (he gets "furious") and wanders from one country to another in search of Angelica. On the run from Orlando, an old hermit with magical powers takes Angelica to a desert island, letting a demon take control of his horse. He hides her in a cave and puts her into a deep sleep, after which he removes her clothes and gazes at her. However, when he wants to kiss her body, he lets moral remorse stop him.

The Orlando Furioso was very popular at the time of Rubens and the adventures of Angelica inspired numerous artists, especially between 1550 and 1800. The story of Angelica and the hermit was already used by Tintoretto in the 16th century as the subject of a painting, which it was studied by Rubens in Venice between 1600 and 1602.
