= Atanasio Bimbacci =

Italian painter

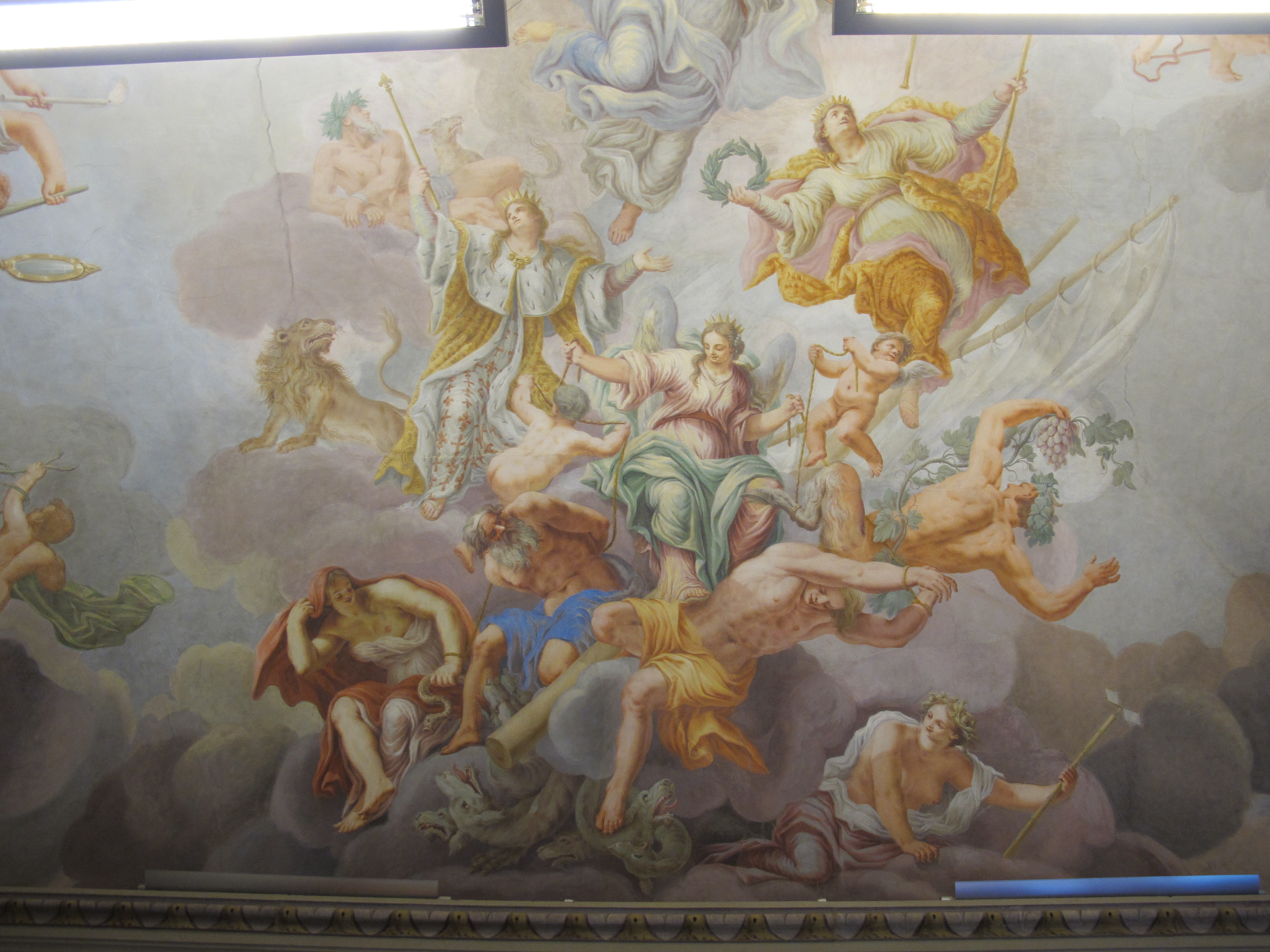
Fresco in Palazzo Franceschi, Florence

Atanasio Bimbacci (c. 1654–1734) was an Italian painter of the Baroque period, active mainly in his native Florence, Grand Duchy of Tuscany. He painted a St Louis Gonzaga for the church of Santa Maria Maddalena de' Pazzi in Florence. He also decorated a number of residences. He was a pupil of Ciro Ferri. Others describe him as a follower of Luca Giordano.
