= Ciro Ferri =

Italian sculptor and painter (1634–1689)

- Self-portrait, 1670, Uffizi, Florence
- Born: 3 September 1633; Rome, Papal States
- Died: 13 September 1689 (aged 56); Rome, Papal States
- Education: Pietro da Cortona
- Known for: Sculpture; Painting
- Notable work: Ananias Curing Saul's Blindness (1660)
- Movement: Baroque

Ciro Ferri (3 September 1633 – 13 September 1689) was an Italian Baroque sculptor and painter, the chief pupil and successor of Pietro da Cortona.

== Biography ==
He was born in Rome, where he began working under Cortona and with a team of artists in the extensive fresco decorations of the Quirinal Palace (1656–59). He collaborated with Cortona and completed for him the extensive frescoed ceilings and other internal decorations begun in the Pitti Palace, Florence (1659–65). In 1660, he also painted Ananias Curing Saul's Blindness.

His independent masterpiece is considered an extensive series of scriptural frescoes in the church of Basilica di Santa Maria Maggiore (Bergamo). Also well known is his an altarpiece of St Ambrose Healing the Sick in the church of Sant'Ambrogio della Massima in Rome.

In 1670, he began the painting of the cupola of Sant'Agnese in Agone in central Rome, in a style recalling of Lanfranco's work in the dome of Sant'Andrea della Valle; but died before it was completed in 1693 by his successor Sebastiano Corbellini.

He executed also a large amount of miscellaneous designs, such as etchings and frontispieces for books; and served as an architect as well. Ferri was appointed to direct the Florentine students in Rome, and Gabbiani was one of his leading pupils. As regards style, Ferri ranks as chief of the grand manner of Cortona, also known as the Machinists movement, as opposed to the more sober and spare style promulgated by Andrea Sacchi, and continued by Carlo Maratta and others. Among the many pupils and assistants were Ambrogio Besozzi, Camillo Gabrielli, Marziale Carpinoni, Filippo Maria Galetti, Benedetto Luti, Giovanni Battista Marmi, Pietro Montanini, Giuseppe Nasini, Giovanni Odazzi, Tommaso Redi, and Urbano Romanelli.

Ciro Ferri became a member of the Accademia di San Luca on 3 June 1657. His ciborium for the high altar of Santa Maria in Vallicella is a masterpiece of 17th-century bronze decorative sculpture. He continued under the patronage of the Medici, when together with the sculptor Ercole Ferrata, Ferri the painter led the Medici Academy in Rome, established in 1673 by Grand Duke Cosimo III of Tuscany. Among the pupils sent there from Florence were Anton Domenico Gabbiani, Giovanni Battista Foggini, Atanasio Bimbacci, Carlo Marcellini, and Massimiliano Soldani Benzi .

Ferri was also responsible for the Reliquary of the Arm of St. John the Baptist, which is found in the St John's Co-Cathedral in Malta. Ciro Ferri contributed five illustrations to the missal of Pope Alexander VII Chigi, which was published in 1662. It also contained works by fellow artists in Rome, including Pietro da Cortona, Carlo Cesi, Guglielmo Cortese, Carlo Maratti, Jan Miel, Cornelis Bloemaert, and Pier Francesco Mola.

Ferri died in Rome on 13 September 1689, aged 56.

== Gallery ==
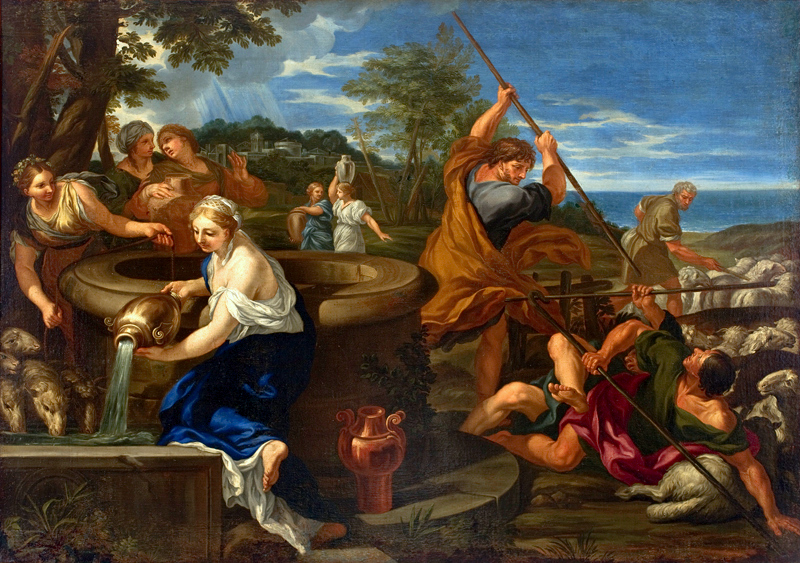
Moses Defending the Daughters of Jethro (1660–89), São Paulo Museum of Art, São Paulo)

Mystic marriage of Saint Catherine of Alexandria, Kunsthistorisches Museum, Vienna

The Meeting of Jacob and Laban, Palazzo Corsini, Rome

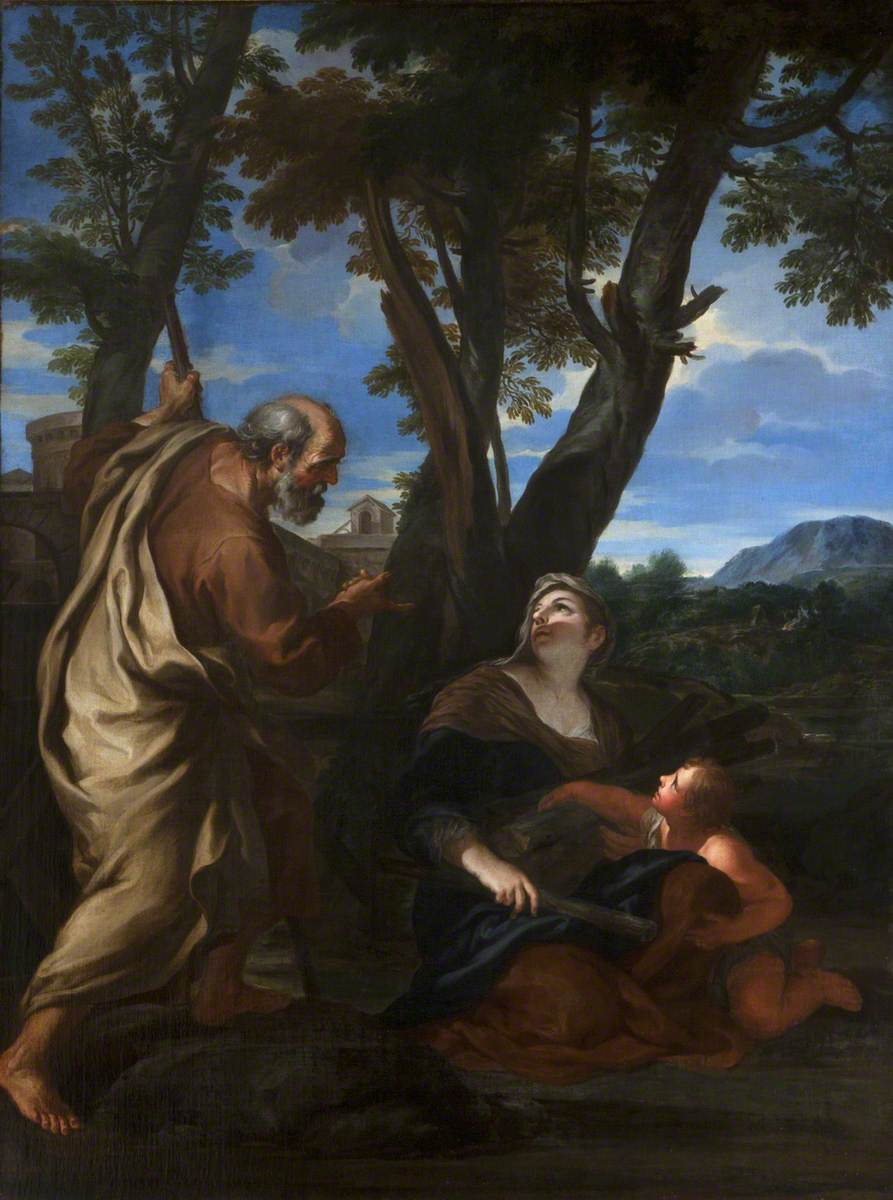
Elijah and the Widow of Zarephath (after 1669), Kedleston Hall, Derbyshire

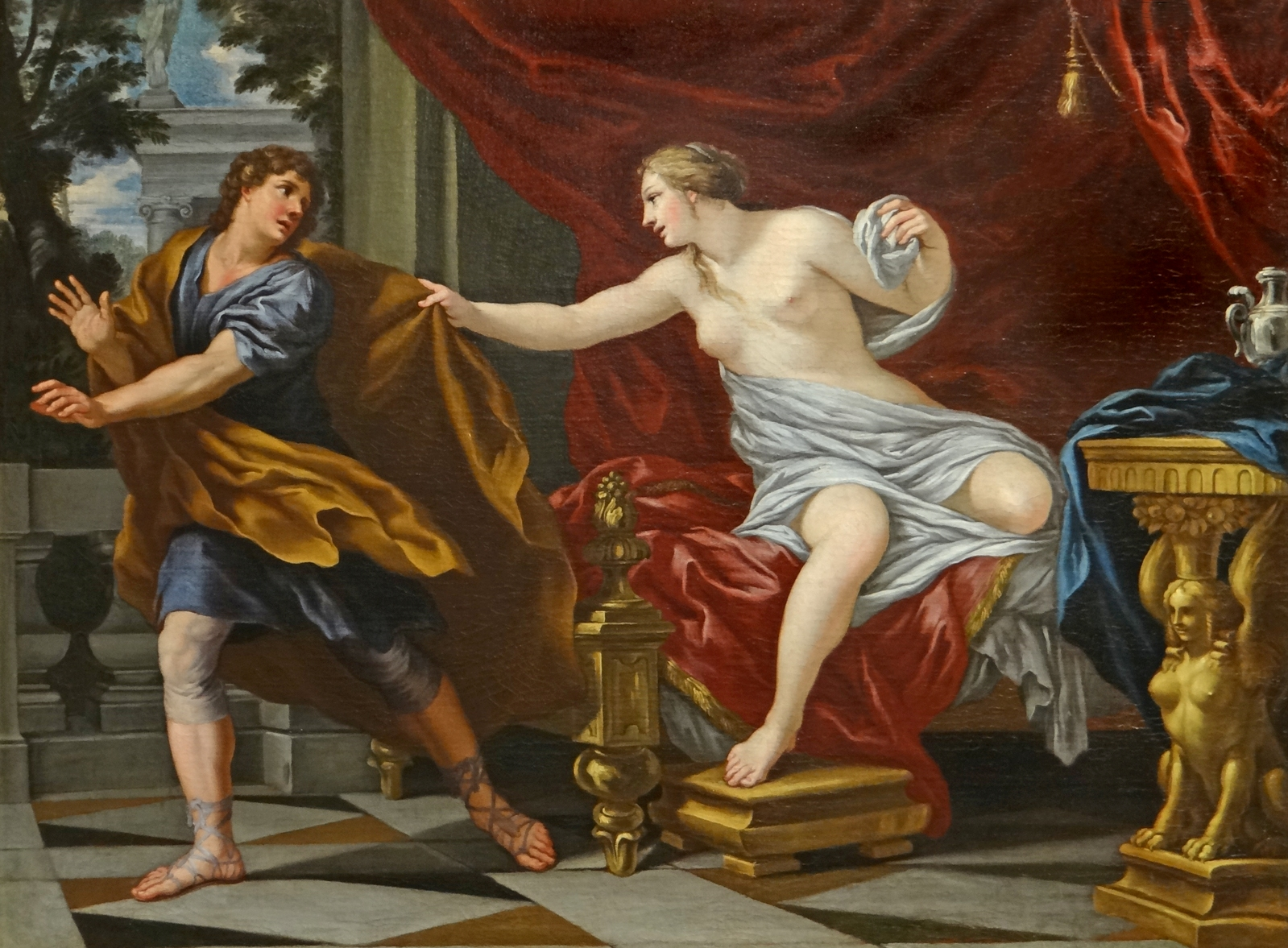
The Chastity of Joseph, Musée des beaux-arts d'Angers

Flight into Egypt, Hunterian Museum and Art Gallery, Glasgow

Sala di Apollo, fresco by Pietro da Cortona and Ciro Ferri, Palazzo Pitti, Florence

The Adoration of the Shepherds, 1670, Fitzwilliam Museum, Oxford

== Bibliography ==
- Prosperi Valenti Rodinò, Simonetta (2003). "Ferri, Ciro". Grove Art Online. Oxford: Oxford University Press. doi:10.1093/gao/9781884446054.article.T028053.
- Wittkower, Rudolph (1980). Art and Architecture Italy, 1600-1750. Penguin Books. pp. 328, 330.
