= Cimino =

Cimino (plural cimini) may refer to

- Cimino (surname)
- Cimino family in Italy
- Cimino fistula, an arteriovenous fistula
- Soriano nel Cimino, a town and comune in central Italy
- A Piano for Mrs. Cimino, a 1982 American TV drama film

== See also ==
- Cimini (disambiguation)
