= Cimini =

Cimini may refer to

- Monti Cimini, a range of volcanic hills near Rome, Italy
- Cimini (surname)
- Cimino family (also Simini) in Italy

== See also ==
- Cimino (disambiguation)
