= Cimmino =

Cimmino is a surname. Notable people with the surname include:

- Catello Cimmino (born 1965), Italian footballer
- Gianfranco Cimmino (1908–1989), Italian mathematician

== See also ==
- Cimino (surname)
