= Giovanni Odazzi =

Italian painter

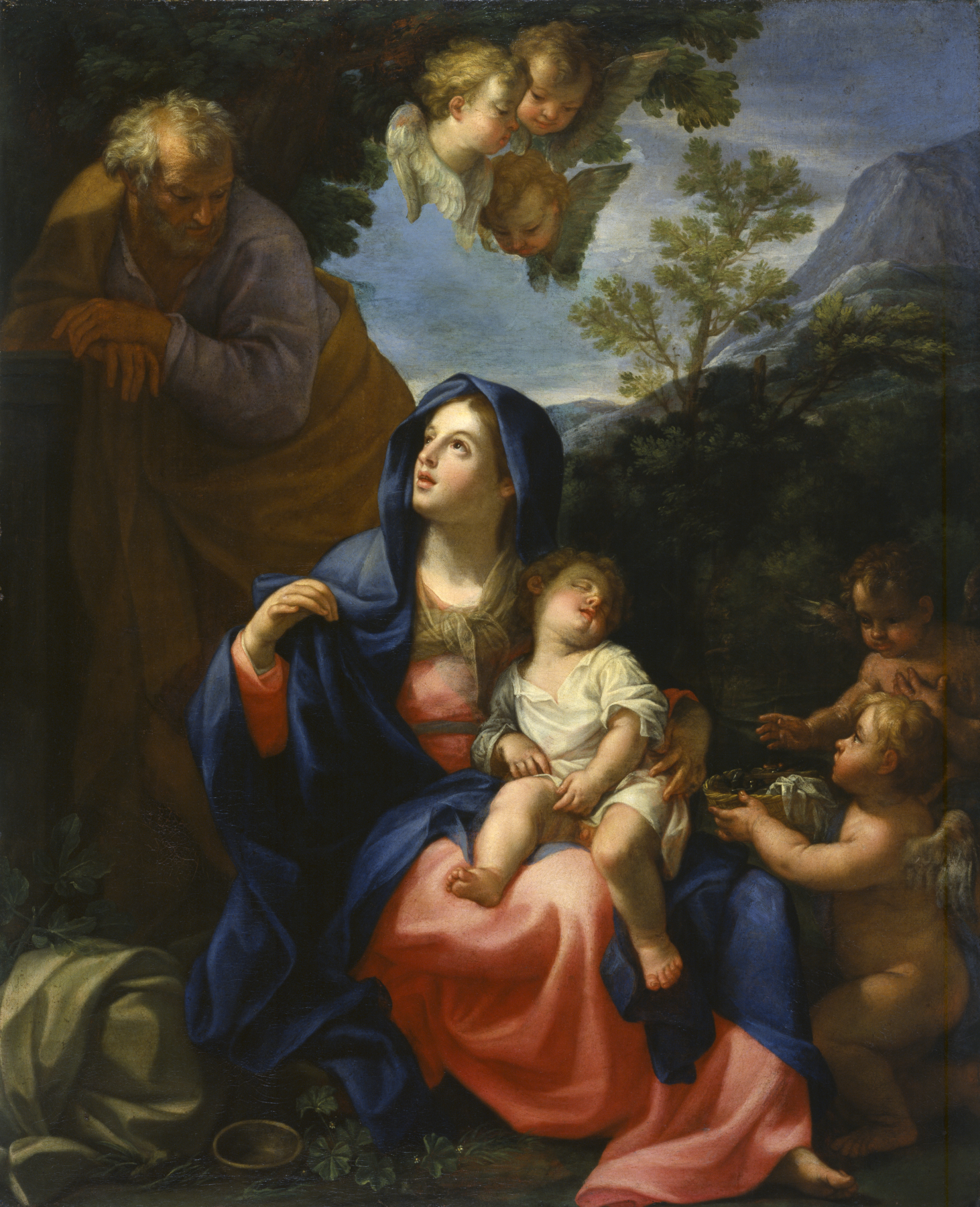
- Rest on Flight to Egypt, c. 1720, Walters Art Museum, Baltimore
- Born: Giovanni Battista Gaulli; 25 May 1663; Rome, Papal States
- Died: 6 June 1731 (aged 68); Rome, Papal States
- Education: Ciro Ferri; Giovanni Battista Gaulli
- Known for: Painting
- Movement: Baroque

Giovanni Odazzi (25 March 1663 – 6 June 1731) was an Italian painter and etcher of the Baroque period, active mainly in Rome.

== Biography ==
Giovanni Odazzi was born in Rome on 25 March 1663. After a brief and unimportant apprenticeship with the engraver Cornelis Bloemaert, he entered the workshop of Ciro Ferri, and after Ferri’s death (1689) became the pupil and assistant of Giovanni Battista Gaulli. He lived almost entirely in Rome and the Lazio. His art developed evenly, without abrupt changes of direction, continuing the traditions established by Ferri and Gaulli. Ferri encouraged the development of his natural facility in drawing, enabling him to create harmonious, although sometimes rather elementary, compositions for his many altarpieces.

His first independent works are three frescoes, showing King David, the Adoration of the Magi and the Flight into Egypt, above the nave arcade in Santa Maria in Ara Coeli in Rome. They are magniloquent Late Baroque works that, in their bold and energetic compositions and facial types, continue the traditions of Pietro da Cortona and Ferri. A little later the altarpiece with Christ and the Virgin Appearing to St. Nicholas of Bari (Rome, Santo Stefano del Cacco) reveals that Odazzi had also absorbed the style of Gaulli; indeed, it is directly based on Gaulli’s altarpiece (1697–8) of the same subject, in Santa Maria Maddalena, Rome.

However, he never repudiated his inheritance from Ferri, and the beautiful Annunciation (c. 1720; Segovia, La Granja) truthfully echoes Ferri’s altarpiece, one of his last works, in the collegiate church of Valmontone (Province of Rome). Like most of the artists working in Rome between the second half of the 17th century and the first half of the 18th, Odazzi was also inspired by Maratta. His monumental fresco of St. Bruno’s Vision of the Virgin (commissioned 1698) was painted for a chapel, designed by Maratta, at the end of the left transept in Santa Maria degli Angeli e dei Martiri, Rome. Despite working in the shadow of Ferri, Gaulli and Maratti, Odazzi achieved a degree of independence.

His St. Bernard’s Vision of the Crucified Christ and Virgin and Child with St. Robert of Molesmes and St. Benedict (both c. 1710; Rome, San Bernardo alle Terme) most brilliantly reveal his individual style. Compositionally, they derive from Gaulli and Maratta, although the space is less fluid and vortex-like than in Gaulli, and the expression of sentiment less intense than in Maratta; gestures are softened, and crystallized. Odazzi’s originality is evident above all in the colour, in the use of varied and clear tints, spread out in areas of brightness to create porcelain-like effects, which link the art of the Late Baroque to that of painters such as Agostino Masucci, who anticipated aspects of Neoclassicism.

There followed the frescoes of the Fall of the Rebel Angels (c. 1715; Santi Apostoli, Rome), inspired by Gaulli’s frescoes in the church of the Gesù, Rome, and frescoes (after 1722) showing Justice and Peace, Faith and Hope and Charity and Prudence, in the Palazzo Albani (now del Drago), Rome, commissioned by Cardinal Annibale Albani. These works, although retaining the Baroque illusionistic device of showing figures bursting through the picture frame, are nonetheless increasingly classicist. In these years Odazzi was a highly successful artist, and the agent of Lothar Franz von Schönborn, Archbishop of Mainz, cited him among the most eminent history painters in Rome, alongside Sebastiano Conca, Giuseppe Bartolomeo Chiari, and Francesco Trevisani. He was knighted by Pope Clement XI. Odazzi died in Rome on 6 June 1731.

== Works ==
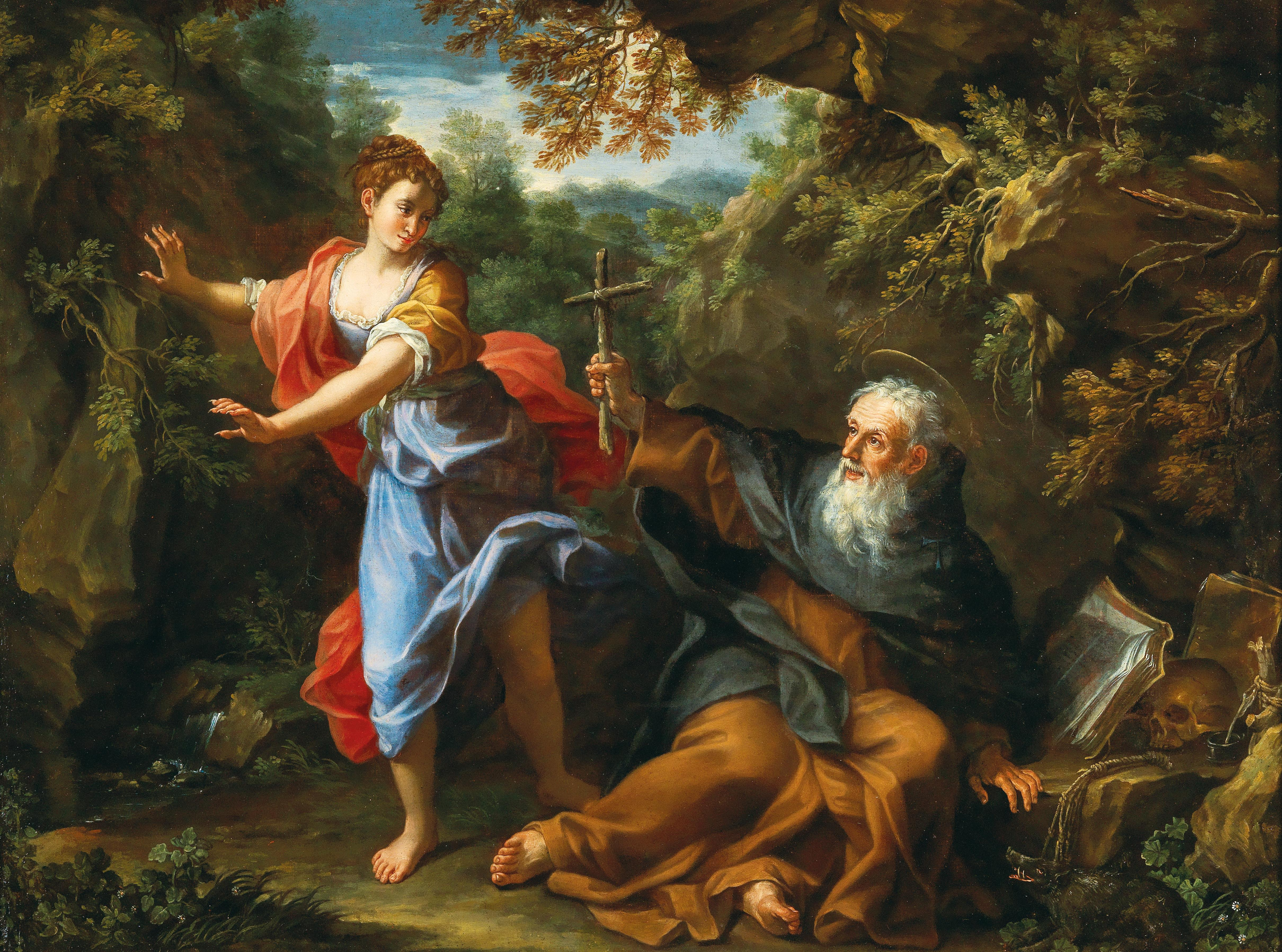
The Temptation of Saint Anthony, priv. col.

- Annunciation, priv. col.
- Temptation of St. Anthony, oil on canvas, 71.c x 95.1 cm
- Prophet Hosea (1718), San Giovanni in Laterano
- Fall of Lucifer and Rebel Angels, Santi Apostoli, Rome
- Adoration of the Magi, Flight to Egypt and King David, Santa Maria in Aracoeli, Rome
- Dream of Joseph, Santa Maria della Scala
- Apparition of the Virgin at St. Bruno (around 1700), altarpiece at Santa Maria degli Angeli
- San Ciriaco, Santa Maria in Via Lata
- Vision of St. Bernard (1705), San Bernardo alle Terme
- St. Andrew in Glory, Sant'Andrea al Quirinale
- Martyr of St. Barbara, St. Barbara (Santa Barbara) chapel, Rieti Cathedral (with Antonio Concioli)

== Bibliography ==
- Pascoli, Lione (1736). Vite de' pittori, scultori, ed architetti moderni. Vol. 2. Rome: Antonio de' Rossi. pp. 386–99.
- Farquhar, Maria (1855). Ralph Nicholson Wornum (ed.). Biographical catalogue of the principal Italian painters. London: Woodfall & Kinder. p. 113.
- Clark, A. M. (1981). "The Portraits of Artists Drawn for Nicola Pio". In E. P. Bowron (ed.). Studies in Roman Eighteenth-century Painting. Washington.
