= Cimino (surname) =

Cimino (/tʃɪˈmiːnoʊ/ chim-EE-noh, Italian: [tʃiˈmiːno]) is an Italian surname that may refer to:

- Cimino family in Italy
- Anthony J. Cimino (born 1947), American politician
- Chris Cimino (born 1961), American meteorologist on TV news programs
- Cristina Cimino (born 1964), Italian rhythmic gymnast
- James Cimino (1928–2010), American endocrinologist
  - Cimino fistula, an arteriovenous fistula named after James
- James J. Cimino, American physician-scientist and biomedical informatician
- Jay Cimino (1936–2024), American entrepreneur
- Joe Cimino (born c. 1969), Canadian politician
- Leonardo Cimino (1917–2012), American film, television and stage actor
- Marygrace Cimino, American politician
- Michael Cimino (1939–2016), American film director, screenwriter, producer, and author
- Michael Cimino (actor) (born 1999), American actor
- Pete Cimino (born 1942), American baseball player
- Rosalba Cimino (born 1990), Italian politician
- Serafino Cimino (1873–1928), Italian Franciscan, bishop and diplomat

== See also ==
- Cimini (surname)
