= Giacinto Calandrucci =

Italian painter

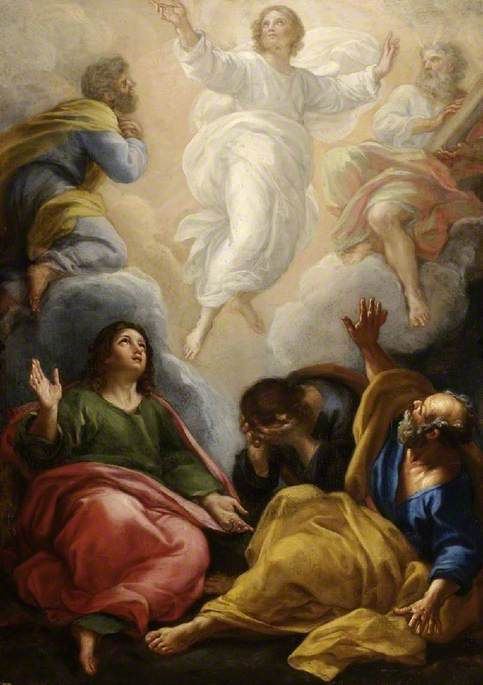
The Transfiguration, Fitzwilliam Museum, Oxford

Giacinto Calandrucci (20 April 1646 – 22 February 1707) was an Italian painter of the Baroque period.

Originally from Palermo, he moved to Rome with his fellow Palermitan painter and engraver Pietro del Pò. Like many painters in Rome in his day, then entered the large and prolific studio of Carlo Maratta. He afterwards worked under Giuseppe Passeri.

In the 1680s Calandrucci completed decorative frescoes of the Four Seasons in the Palazzo Lante; mythological frescoes in the gallery of the Palazzo Muti Papazzurri; the decoration of the gallery of the Palazzo Strozzi-Besso; and a ceiling fresco, and the Sacrifice of Ceres in the papal Villa Falconieri at Frascati. He also painted idyllic pastoral scenes, among them two pictures at Burghley House, Stamford, England. He also painted in Rome two works for the main altar and the Cimini Chapel in the church of Sant'Antonio dei Portoghesi, a Virgin and Child with St Anne and Saints in frescoes and canvases in San Bonaventura (before 1686), a Holy Family with St Anne and a St Anthony of Padua, both in San Paolo alla Regola (c. 1700), and frescoes in Santa Maria dell'Orto (c. 1700–1705). In 1705 he returned to Palermo, where he began the decoration of the Oratory of San Lorenzo. He also painted for the church of Santissimo Salvatore, representing The Virgin with St. Basil and other Saints. He died in 1707 at Palermo. His brother Domenico and his nephew Giovanni Battista were painters of lesser renown.

He left behind an abundance of drawings on topics from both historical and religious subjects to acute daily observations.
