= Giovanni Francesco Romanelli =

Italian painter

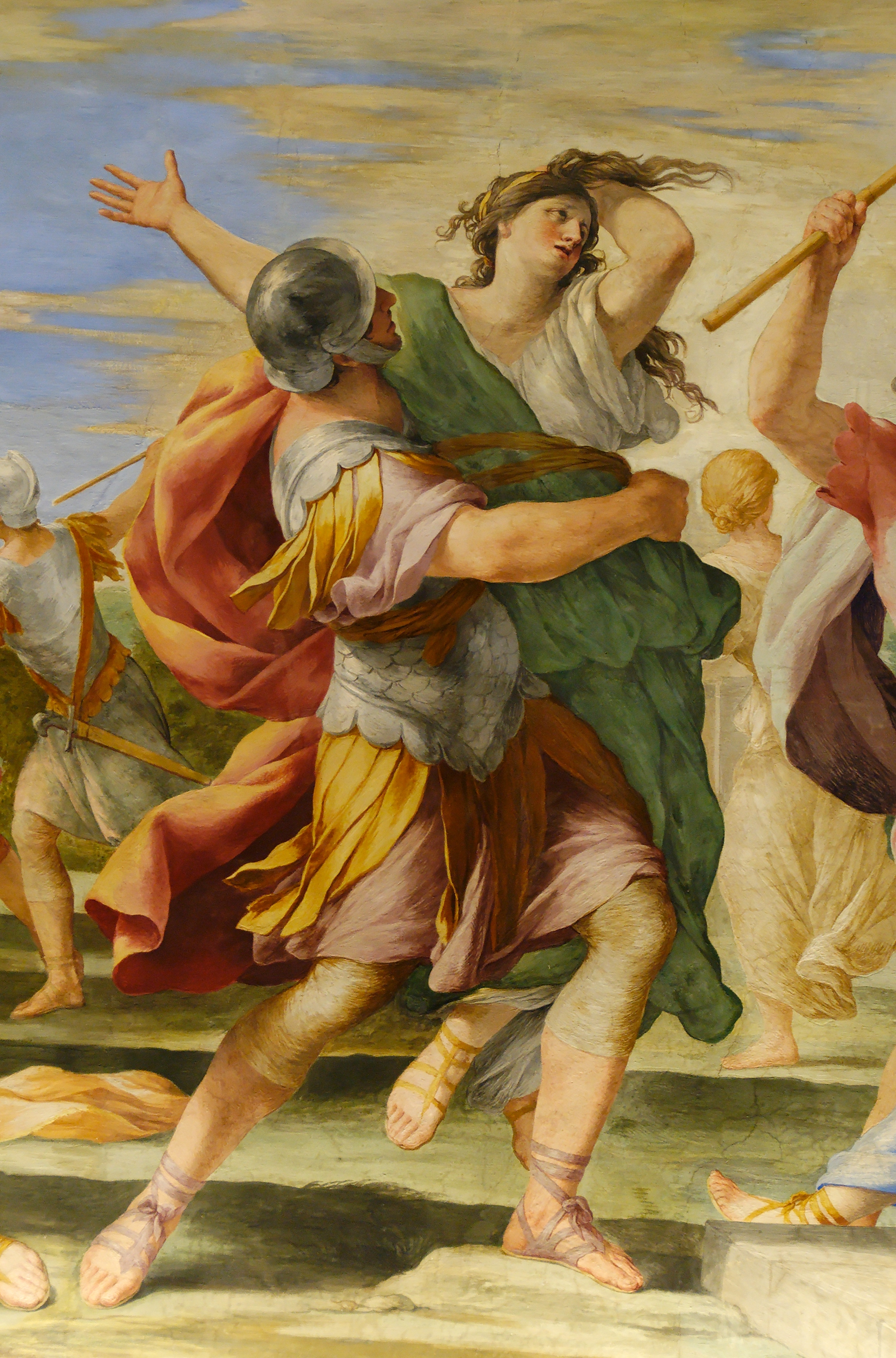
- The Rape of the Sabine Women, detail of a fresco in the Queen's Cabinet, Louvre
- Born: 1610; Viterbo, Papal States
- Died: 9 November 1662 (aged 51–52); Viterbo, Papal States
- Education: Pietro da Cortona
- Known for: Painting
- Movement: Baroque

Giovanni Francesco Romanelli (Viterbo, 1610 – Viterbo, 9 November 1662) was a major Italian painter of the Baroque period, celebrated for his use of bright, vivid colors and also for his clarity of detail. Many of his works are on display in the Louvre.

== Biography ==
=== Early life and education ===
Born in Viterbo to Laura de Angelis and Bartolomeo Romanelli, he went to Rome at age 14 to study to become an artist, and within a few years became part of the household of Cardinal Francesco Barberini. He was a pupil in the painting studio of Pietro da Cortona, the leading painter of his day, but the two eventually quarreled and so Romanelli left. Romanelli is first recorded in 1631, assisting Cortona on the decoration of the Palazzo Barberini, Rome, which he continued to do during most of that decade, notably on the great ceiling fresco of Divine Providence (1632–9). He also contributed to Cortona's Quarant’Ore decorations for San Lorenzo in Damaso, Rome, for 1632–3. In his easel pictures of the 1630s, such as the Rape of Helen (Rome, Capitoline Museums), Romanelli is close to the most classical of Cortona's works.

=== In Barberinian Rome ===
Romanelli's first known independent commission was for the Barberini pope Urban VIII: a fresco for an overdoor in St. Peter's, St. Peter Healing the Sick (1636–7; Rome, Vatican, Museo del tesoro di San Pietro). In 1637 Romanelli began a series of cartoons of decorative putti for tapestries in the Apostolic Palace, apparently intended as a direct imitation of those designed by the Raphael school for Leo X in 1520. Also in 1637 payments began for his fresco cycle (possibly begun earlier) of scenes from the Life of Matilda of Tuscany, in the Sala della Contessa Matilda in the Vatican (1637–42), a work that reveals a certain weakness in large-scale composition. More successful were his ceiling fresco of Feed my Sheep and altarpiece of the Nativity in the Vatican Gallery of Maps (both 1638).

This period of Vatican commissions closed with his first major altarpiece, the Presentation in the Temple (1638–42; Rome, Santa Maria degli Angeli e dei Martiri), painted for the Cappella della Colonna in St. Peter's, which shows him retreating from Cortona's Venetian colourism to the safety of Bolognese disegno; like most of the altarpieces destined for St. Peter's at this time, it was replaced by a mosaic copy. This extensive Barberini patronage evidently made Romanelli quite a distinguished figure in Rome. From 1637 he featured regularly in the records of the prestigious Accademia di San Luca. In 1639 he was elected director of the Accademia. He contributed a ceiling fresco of Arion to the series of decorations by notable artists in the Palazzo Costaguti, Rome, and frescoed mythological scenes in friezes in the Palazzo Altemps. He was also employed by the most distinguished artistic figure in the city, Bernini, to execute some of the latter's designs for chapel decorations, notably those (1642–6) for the Cappella Raimondi in San Pietro in Montorio, Rome, in which he painted small scenes on the vault.

=== In France ===
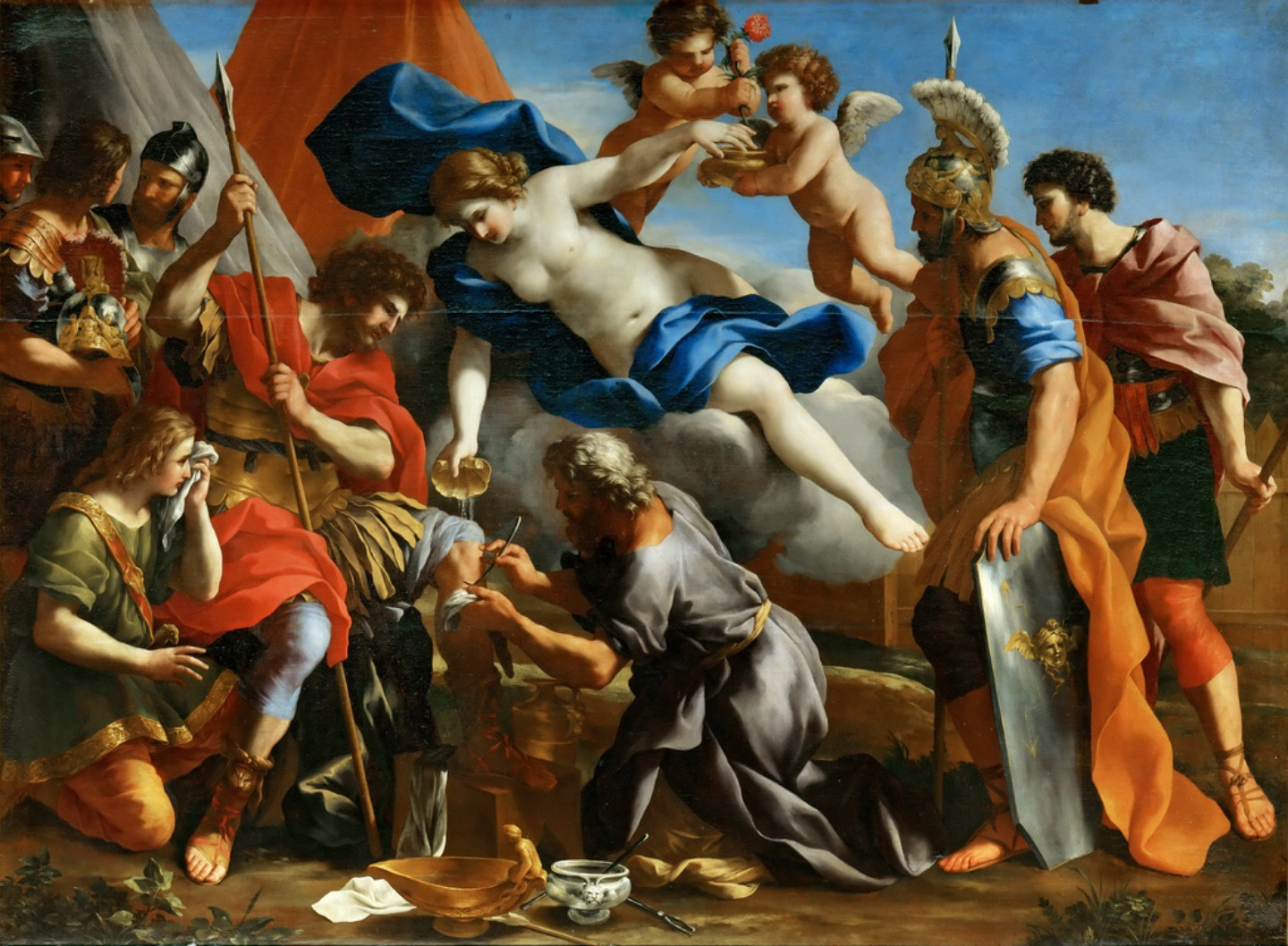
Venus Pouring a Balm on the Wound of Aeneas, Paris, Louvre

With the death of Urban VIII and the accession of Innocent X, the Barberini family fell from favour and Romanelli's patronage ebbed. Urban VIII was succeeded by Innocent X, who was inimical to his predecessor's policies and protégés. It was probably for this reason that Romanelli left Rome in 1646 for Paris, at the invitation of Cardinal Mazarin, chief adviser to Anne of Austria, the Queen Regent and a political ally of Cardinal Francesco Barberini. Mazarin commissioned Romanelli to decorate the ceiling of the upper of two galleries that had been added to the Hôtel de Chevry-Tubeuf to house the Cardinal's art collection (it is now the Galerie Mazarine in the Bibliothèque nationale de France). Introducing the latest developments in Italian ceiling painting, here Romanelli painted mythological scenes that incorporate illusionistic effects and are framed in elaborate, partly gilt, stucco.

Romanelli bowed to French taste by largely excluding true illusionism from his figures; he concentrated on the unifying impression of an array of large-scale, clearly defined panels, linked by smaller fields, covering the whole expanse of the vault. The main scenes represent the Battle of the Giants, the Rape of Helen, the Burning of Troy and Parnassus; the lesser show various mythological and allegorical figures. The character of this scheme, its overall clarity of disposition and the decoratively classical Baroque style of its expression were of tremendous importance in the development of Charles Le Brun and his work for Louis XIV.

During this time in Paris, Romanelli also contributed to the sumptuous decoration of the Cabinet de l’Amour of the Hôtel Lambert; here he worked with Eustache Le Sueur, on whose style he again had a significant effect. In France Romanelli was made a knight of the Order of St. Michael by King Louis XIV.

=== Later career ===
In 1648 Romanelli was back in Rome. It was probably at this period that he painted his finest altarpiece, the Virgin of the Rosary (Rome, Santi Domenico e Sisto), in which the grace and charm of the figures are superbly controlled by his compositional facility. A different kind of facility, however, informs his fresco decorations in the Palazzo Lante, Rome (1653); the ceiling painting of Mars, Venus and Mercury and six lunettes featuring episodes of Roman history have a noticeably mechanical air.

In 1655, Romanelli was recalled to Paris. He was commissioned to decorate the summer apartment of the Queen in the Louvre Palace, four rooms – the Salles des Saisons, de la Paix, de Sévère and des Antonins – for which he produced elaborate arrangements of panels as ceiling decoration (1655–7). The opportunity to combine a wider range of subjects than usual, not only mythologies and histories but also allegorical and religious scenes, did not stimulate him artistically, and the results give a somewhat limp, faded impression. The gold and white stuccos, however, executed by Michel Anguier after Romanelli's designs, are of great elegance.

In 1658 Romanelli returned to Viterbo, where he provided a fine St. Lawrence for the high altar of the cathedral. Soon afterwards he was back in Rome. For the convent of Sant'Agostino he painted the Charity of St. Thomas of Villanueva; its dignified and graceful composition was imitated by Melchiorre Cafà in his marble group of the same subject in the adjacent church ( 1661; Rome, S Agostino), thus emphasizing Romanelli's position as a precursor of the Late Baroque. In 1660 Romanelli found himself back where he had started 30 years earlier, painting sumptuous, decorative frescoes for the Barberini family (Rome, Palazzo Barberini). He died in Viterbo on 9 November 1662. Romanelli's pupils included his son Urbano Romanelli and the painter from Visone, Giovanni Monevi.

== Selected works ==
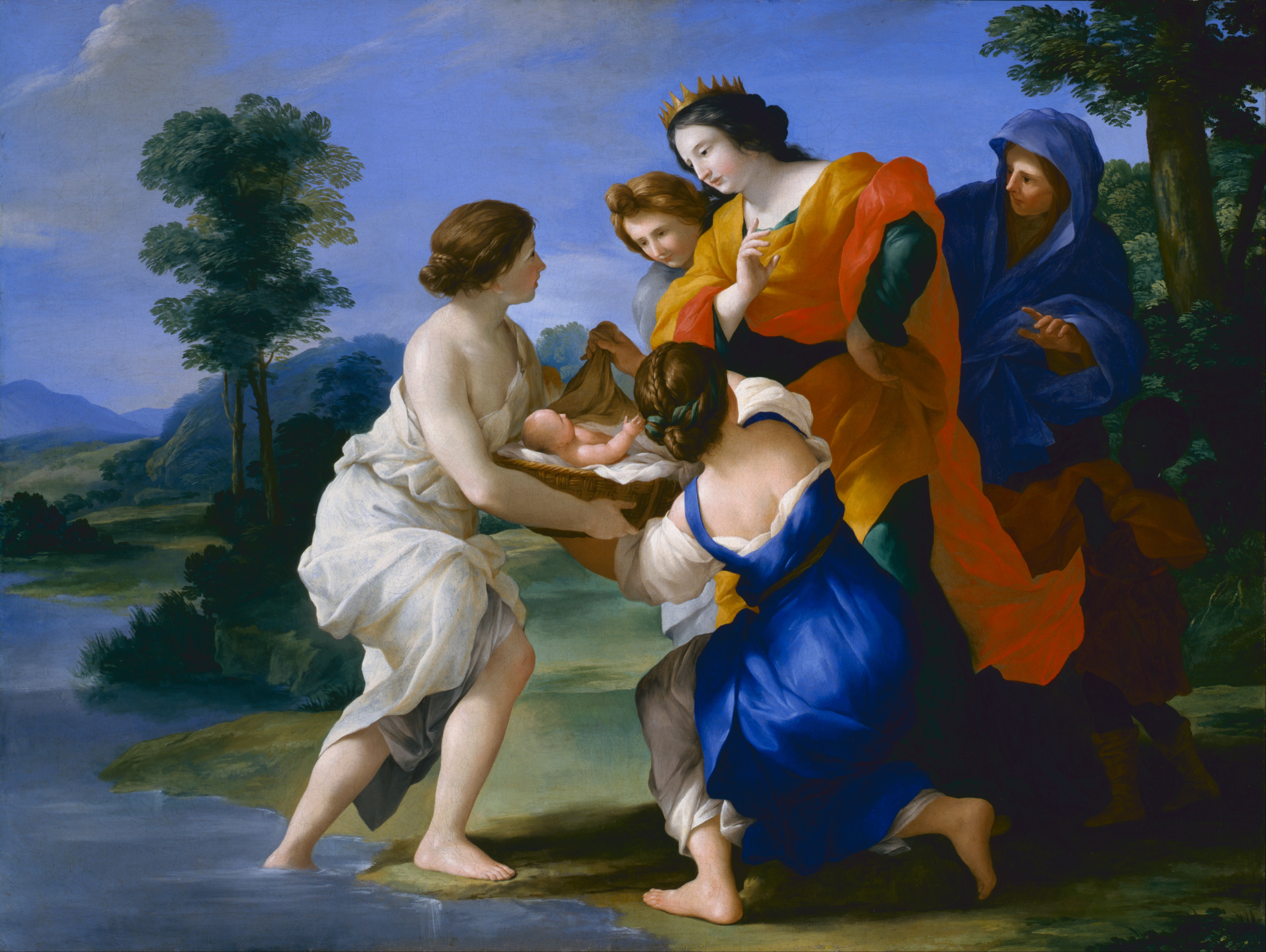
The Finding of Moses, Indianapolis Museum of Art

- Deposition from the Cross, Sant'Ambrogio della Massima, Rome;
- Presentation in the Temple, Santa Maria degli Angeli, Rome;
- The abduction of Elena, Capitoline Museums, Rome;
- The Innocence, Capitoline Museums, Rome
- Venus Pouring a Balm on the Wound of Aeneas, Paris, Louvre;
- The Israelites gathering up Manna, Paris, Louvre;
- Moses and Jethro daughters, Paris, Louvre;
- Allegory Treaty of the Pyrenees, Paris, Louvre;
- The Finding of Moses, Indianapolis, Indianapolis Museum of Art;
- Sibilla, Museo di Capodimonte, Naples;
- Return from the Flight into Egypt, Barcelona, Museu Nacional d'Art de Catalunya;
- Chronos and his child, Warsaw, National Museum in Warsaw
- The Sacrifice of Polyxena, Metropolitan Museum of Art, New York.
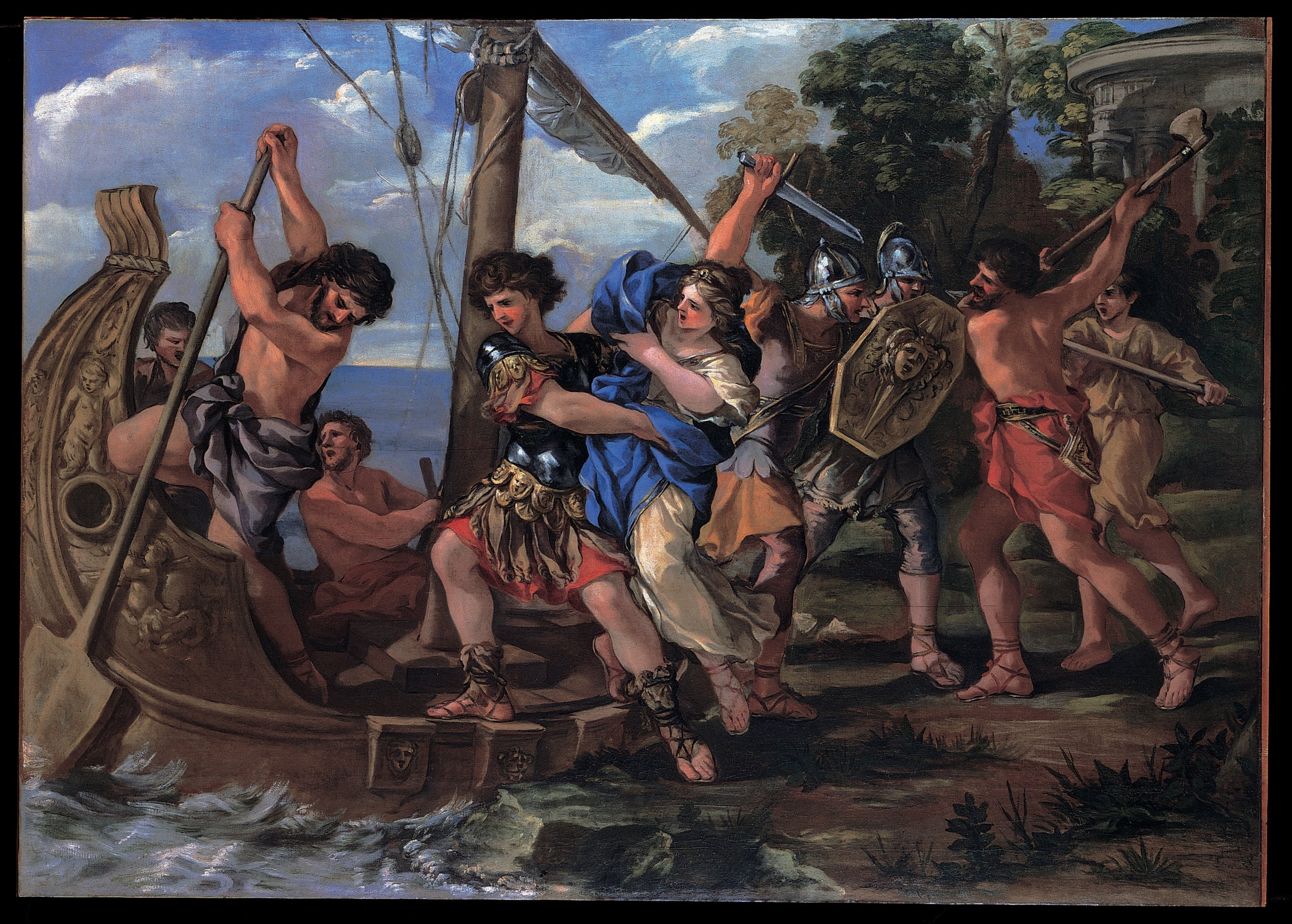
The abduction of Elena, c. 1630, Capitoline Museums, Rome

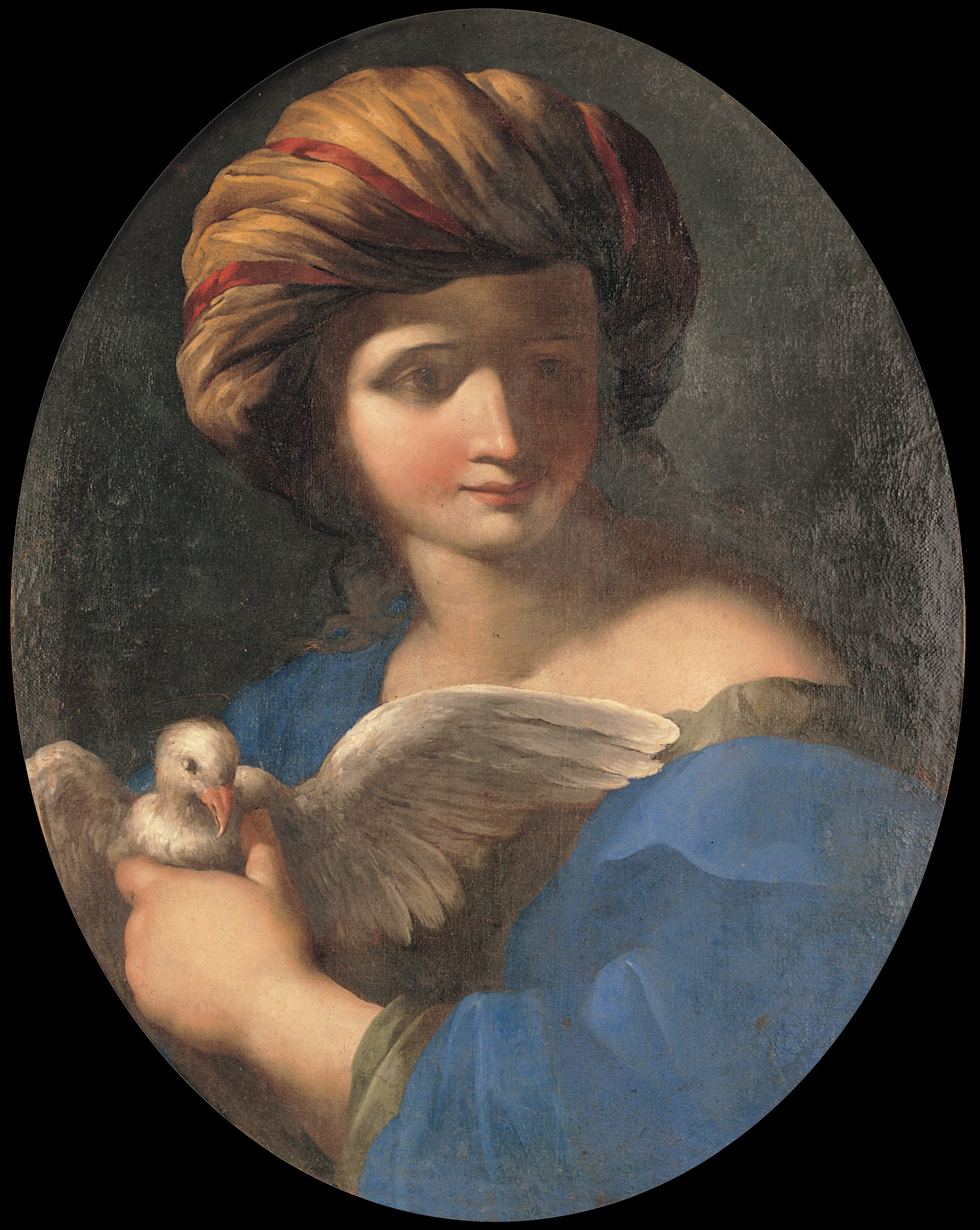
The Innocence, 1650, Capitoline Museums, Rome

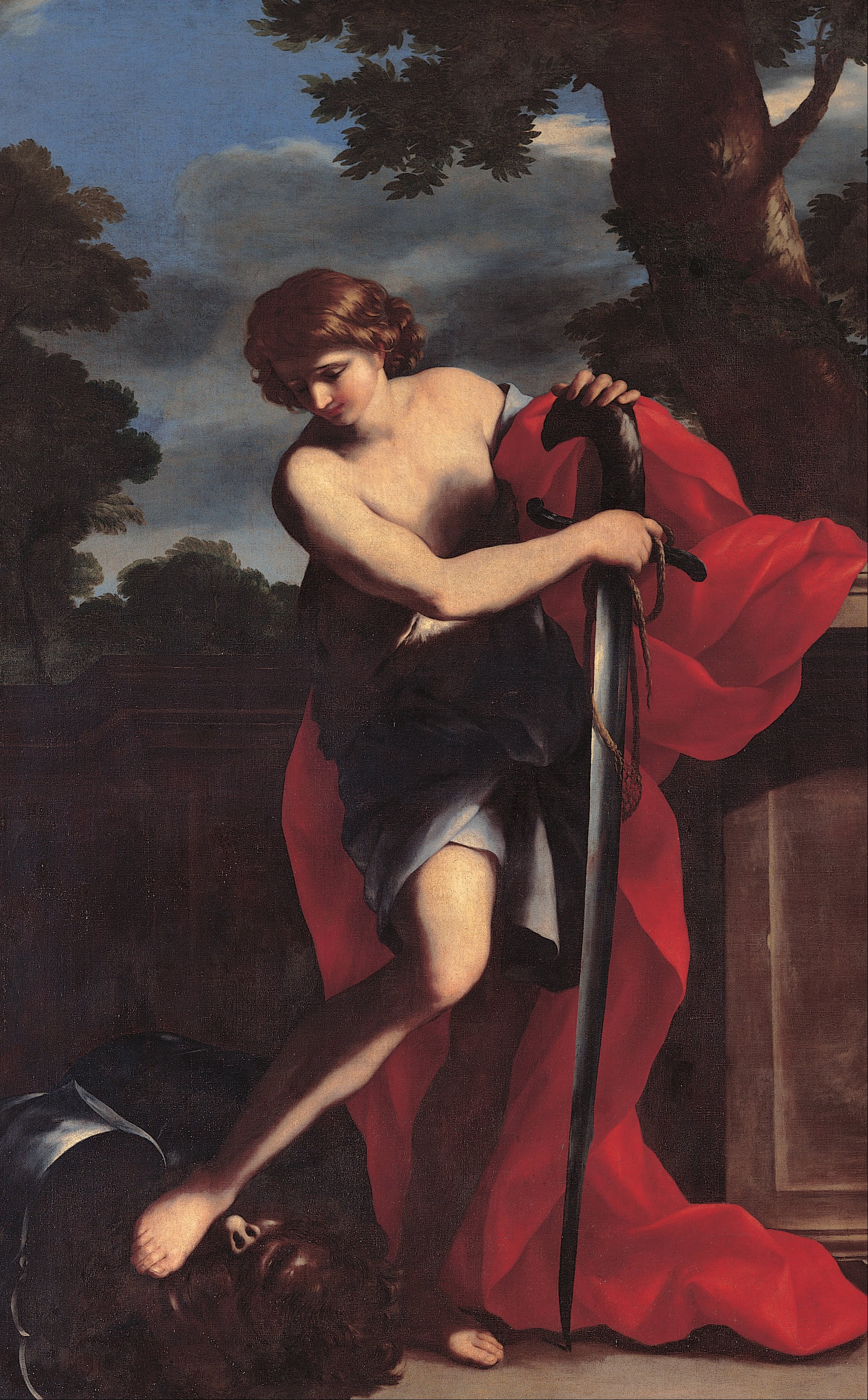
David, c. 1635, Capitoline Museums, Rome

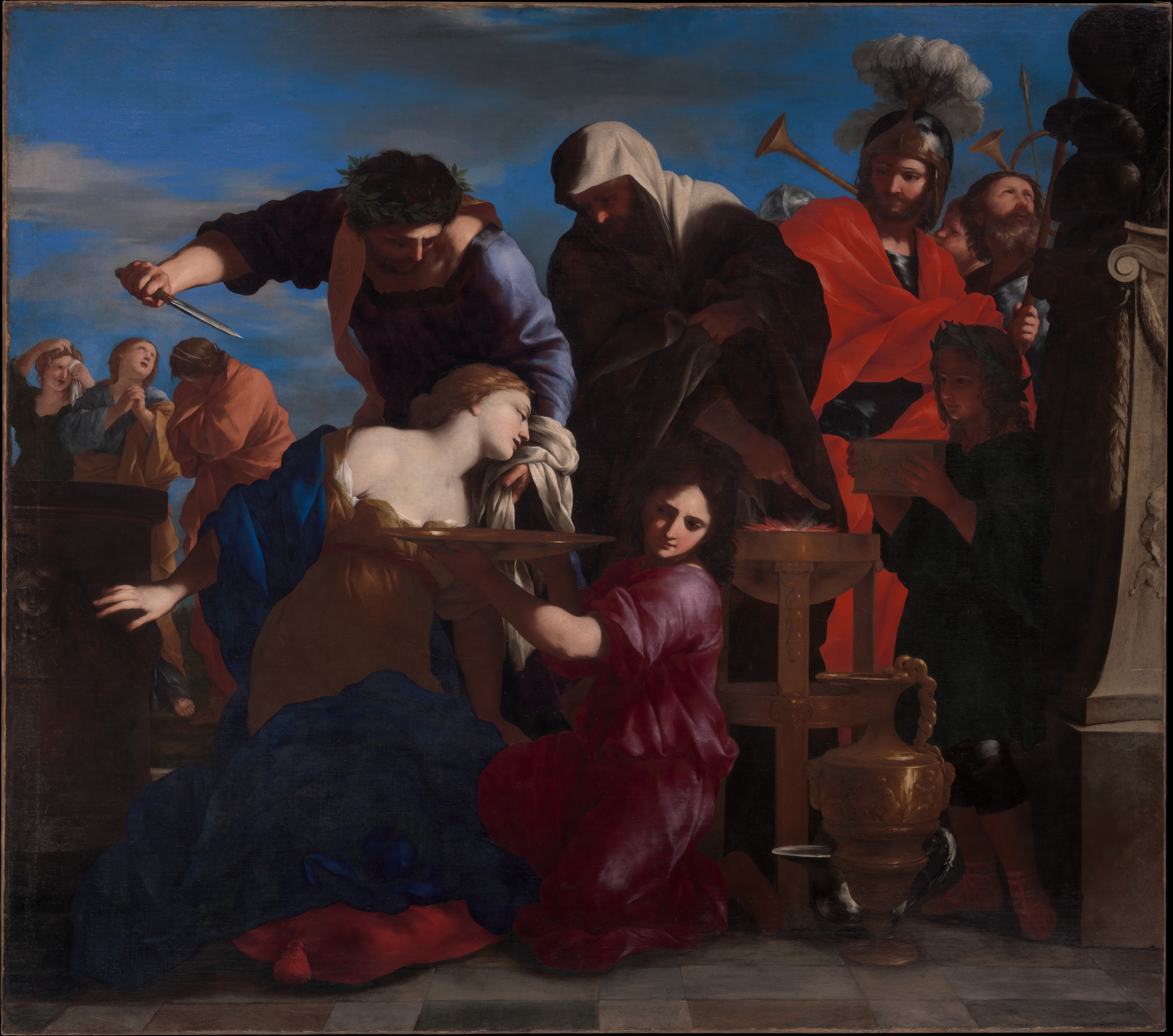
The Sacrifice of Polyxena, Metropolitan Museum of Art, New York

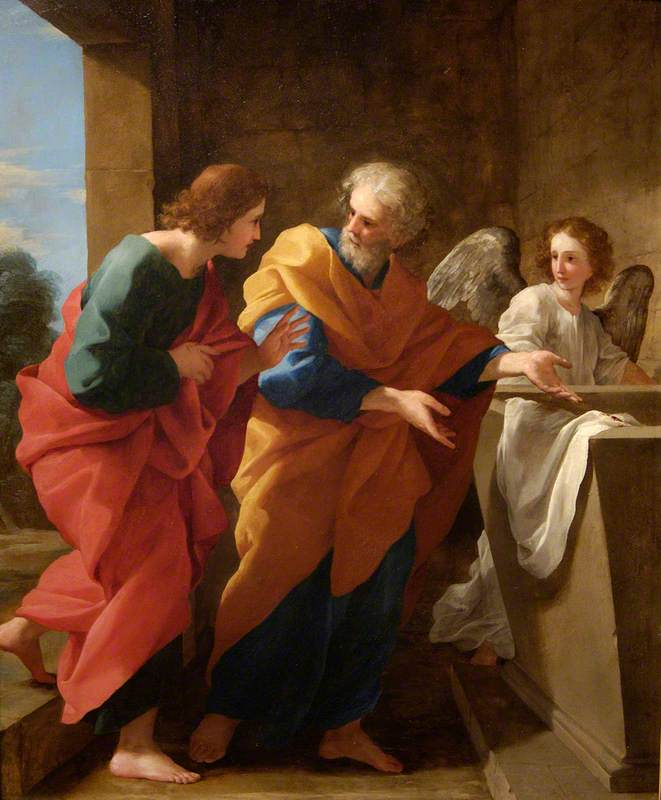
St. John and St. Peter at the Empty Tomb of Christ, Fitzwilliam Museum, Cambridge

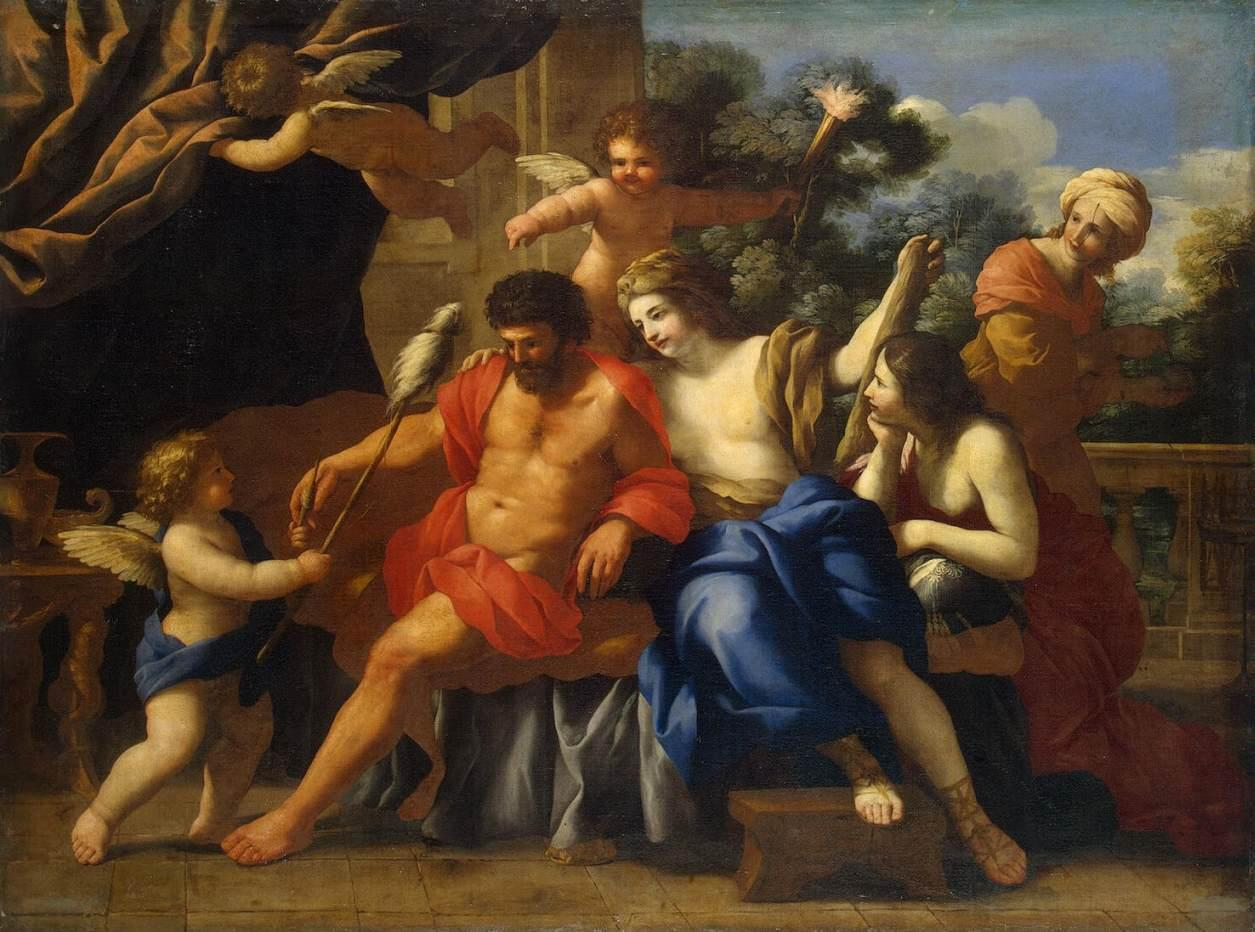
Hercules and Omphale, 1650s, Hermitage Museum, Saint Petersburg

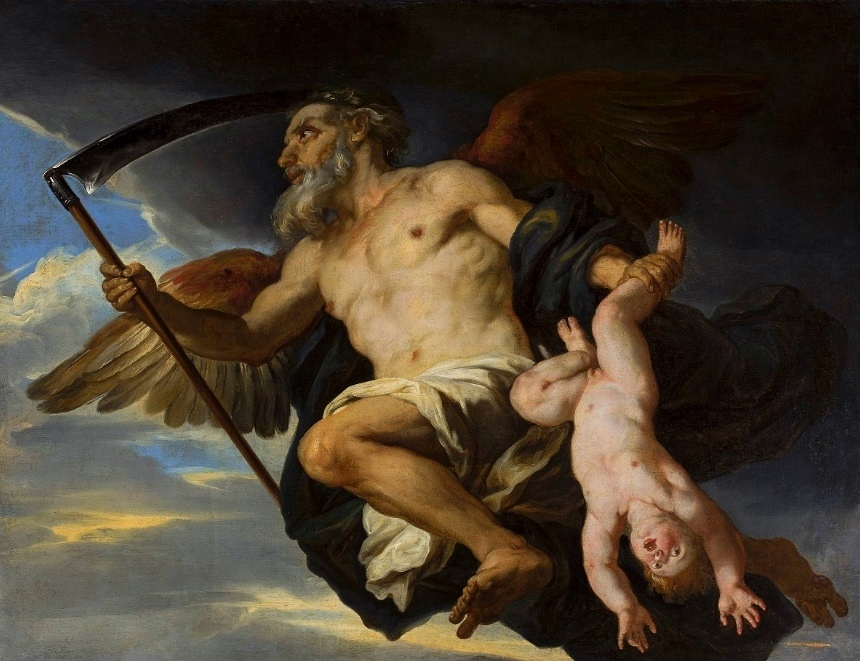
Chronos and his child, Warsaw, National Museum in Warsaw

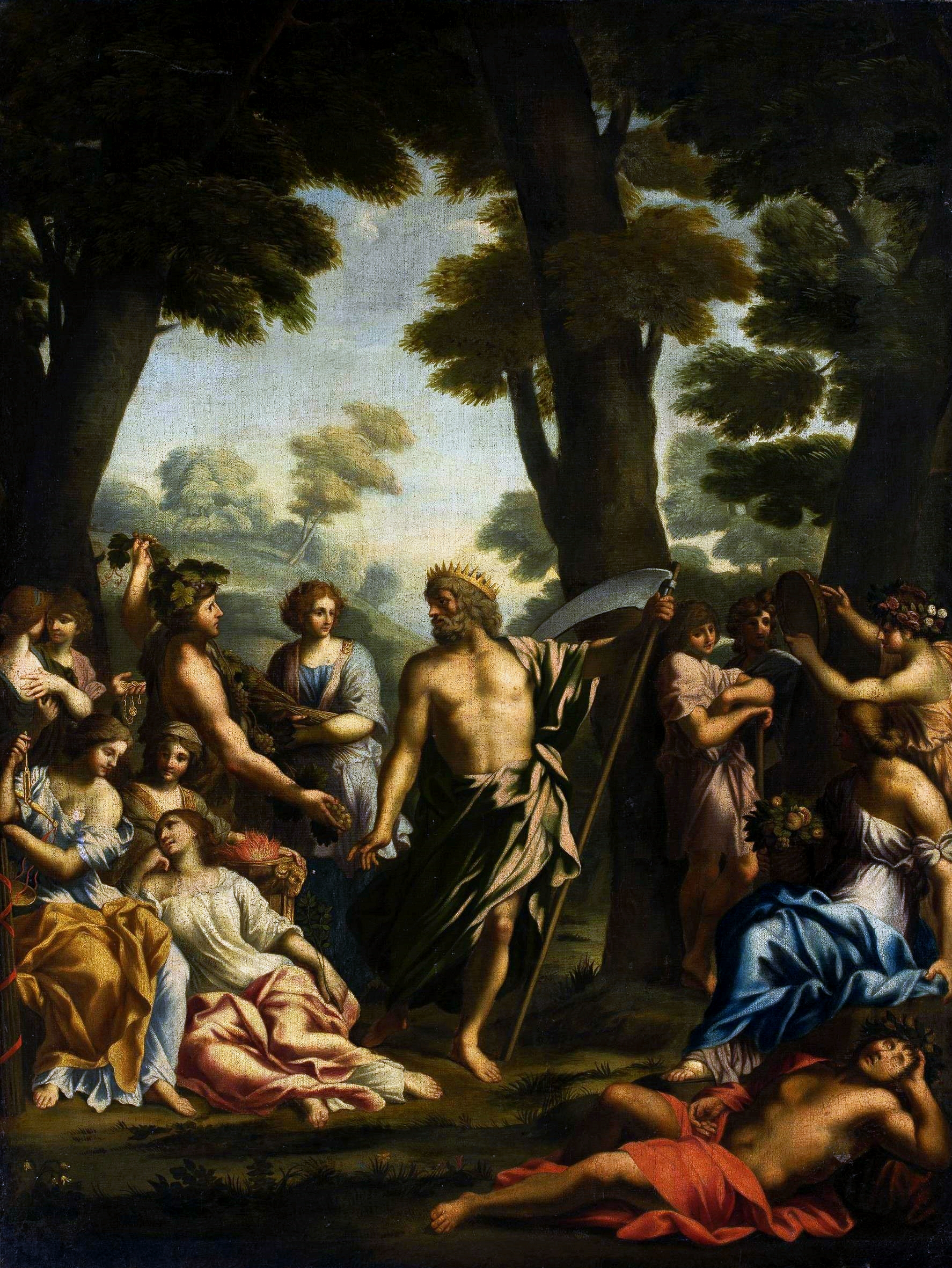
Satyr and Nymphs, Warsaw, National Museum in Warsaw

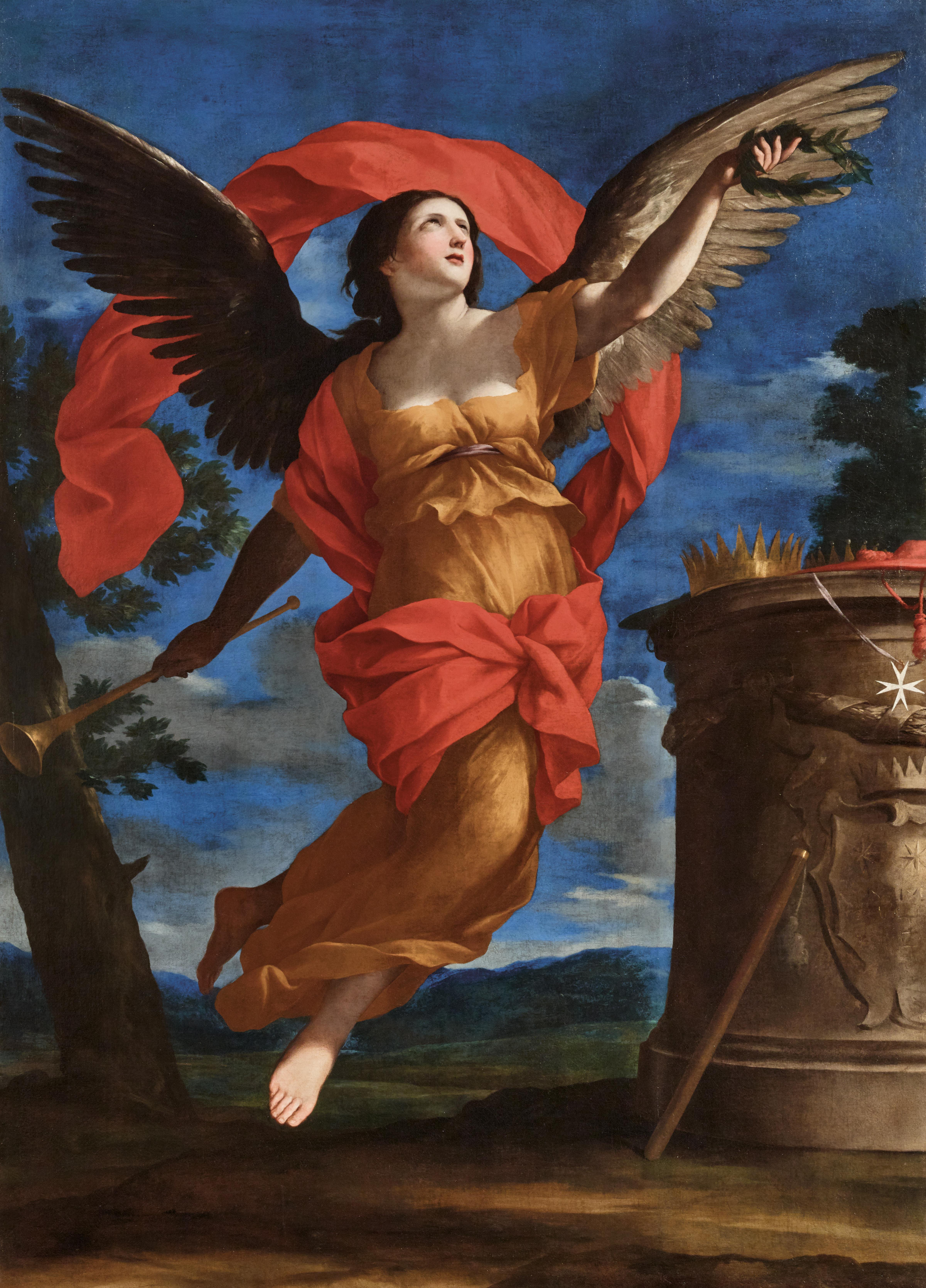
Allegory of Fame, priv. col.

A Sibyl, Rome, Galleria Borghese

== Bibliography ==
- Farquhar, Maria (1855). Ralph Nicholson Wornum (ed.). Biographical catalogue of the principal Italian painters. London: Woodfall & Kinder. pp. 147–148.
- Bruno, Silvia (2017). "ROMANELLI, Giovan Francesco". Dizionario Biografico degli Italiani (in Italian). Vol. 88: Robusti–Roverella. Rome: Istituto dell'Enciclopedia Italiana. ISBN 978-88-12-00032-6.
