= Luigi Agricola =

Italian painter (born c. 1750)

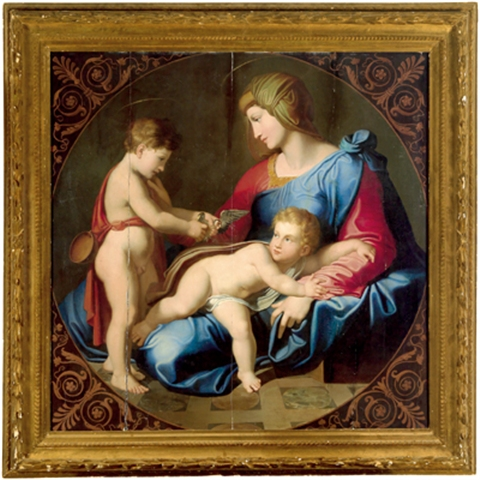
- Madonna and child with Young St John the Baptist
- Born: circa 1750; Rome, Italy
- Died: after 1821
- Education: Professor of Accademia di San Luca
- Known for: Painting
- Movement: Neoclassicism

Luigi Agricola (c. 1750 – 1821 or after) was an Italian painter active in Rome which for most of his life was part of the Papal States.

He also worked with jewelry. He painted a St. Michael the Archangel for the Academy of St Luke in Rome, where he was a professor. He painted an altarpiece of St Elizabeth, Queen of Portugal for the church of Sant'Antonio dei Portoghesi. Another painter by the same name (1667–1712), originally from Ratisbon, was active in landscape painting in the mid-17th century, settling down in Venice.
