= Urbano Romanelli =

Italian painter

Urbano Romanelli (c. 1645–1682) was an Italian painter of the Baroque period.

He was born in Viterbo, the son of the painter, Giovanni Francesco Romanelli. After his father died, he entered the studio of Ciro Ferri in Rome. He painted in Rome and in churches at Velletri and Viterbo.
