= António Martins de Chaves =

Portuguese Catholic cardinal (died 1447)

His Eminence António Martins de Chaves Cardinal
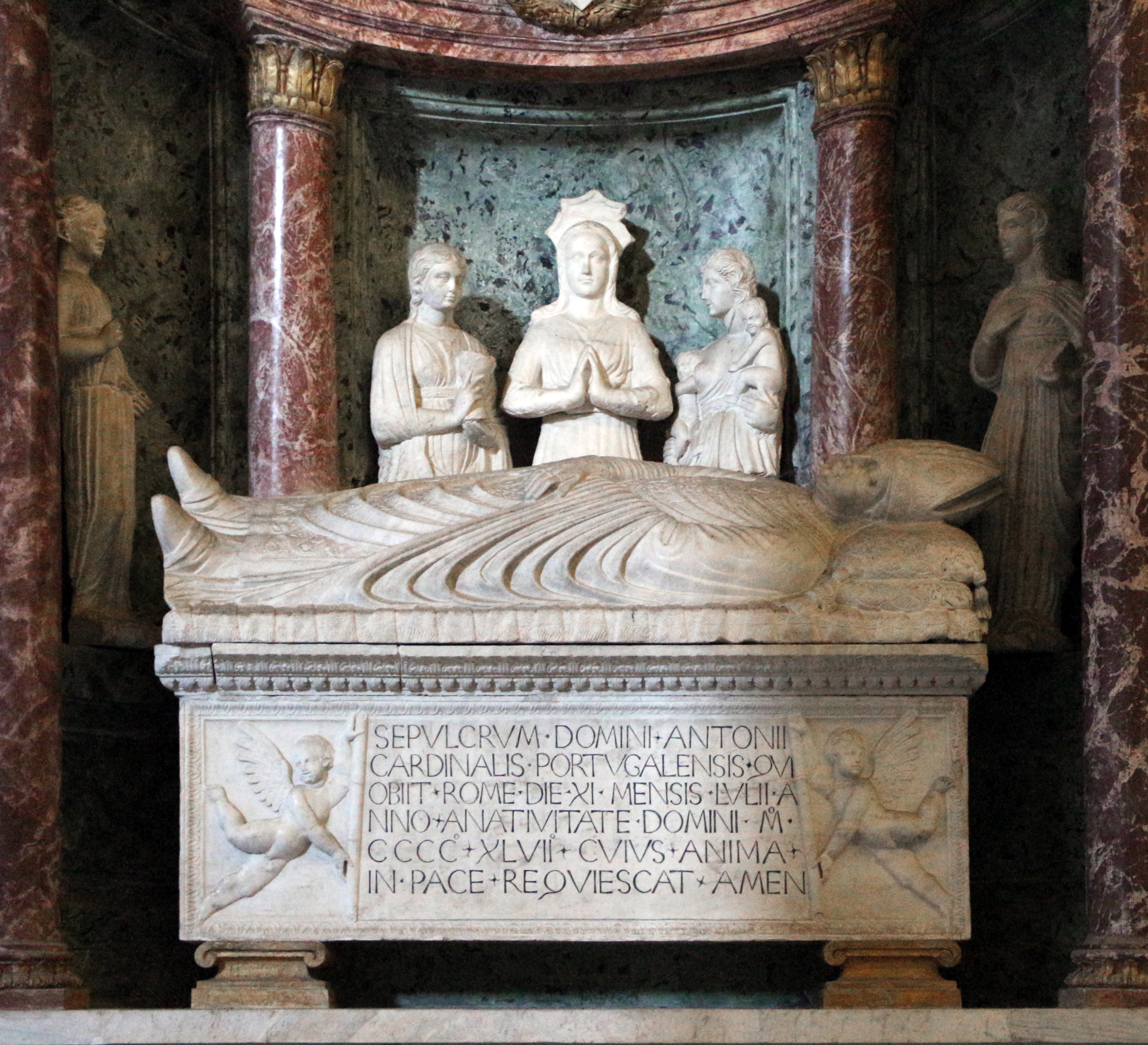
- Tomb monument of Martins de Chaves by Isaia da Pisa in 2016
- Other posts: Archpriest of the Papal Basilica of Saint John Lateran (1444–1447); Bishop of Porto

Orders
- Created cardinal: 18 December 1439 by Pope Eugene IV

Personal details
- Died: 6 July 1447 Rome, Papal States
- Buried: Archbasilica of Saint John Lateran
- Styles
- Reference style: His Eminence
- Spoken style: Your Eminence
- Religious style: Cardinal
- Informal style: Cardinal

António Martins de Chaves (died 6 July 1447) was a Cardinal of the Catholic Church and bishop of Porto in Portugal.

== Career ==
He was made cardinal on the 18 December 1439 by Pope Eugenius IV. He founded the church and hospice of San Antonio dei Portoghesi in 1440.

He attended the Council of Basel as a representative of King Edward I of Portugal.

== Death and burial ==
Chaves died on 6 July 1447 in Rome.

He was buried at the Archbasilica of Saint John Lateran, where he was archpriest from 1444 to his death. His tomb was executed by Isaia da Pisa.

== Bibliography ==
- Enrique Flórez; Manuel Risco; Antolín Merino; et al. (1766). España sagrada. Vol. Tomo XXI (Porto, Galicia). Madrid: M. F. Rodriguez. pp. 163–165language=Spanish.
- Eubel, Conradus, ed. (1914). Hierarchia catholica, Tomus 2 (second ed.). Münster: Libreria Regensbergiana.(in Latin), pp. 8 no. 14; 26 no. 1, 27 no. 33; 28 no. 81; 218, with note 1.
