= Ercole Graziani the Younger =

Italian painter (1688–1765)

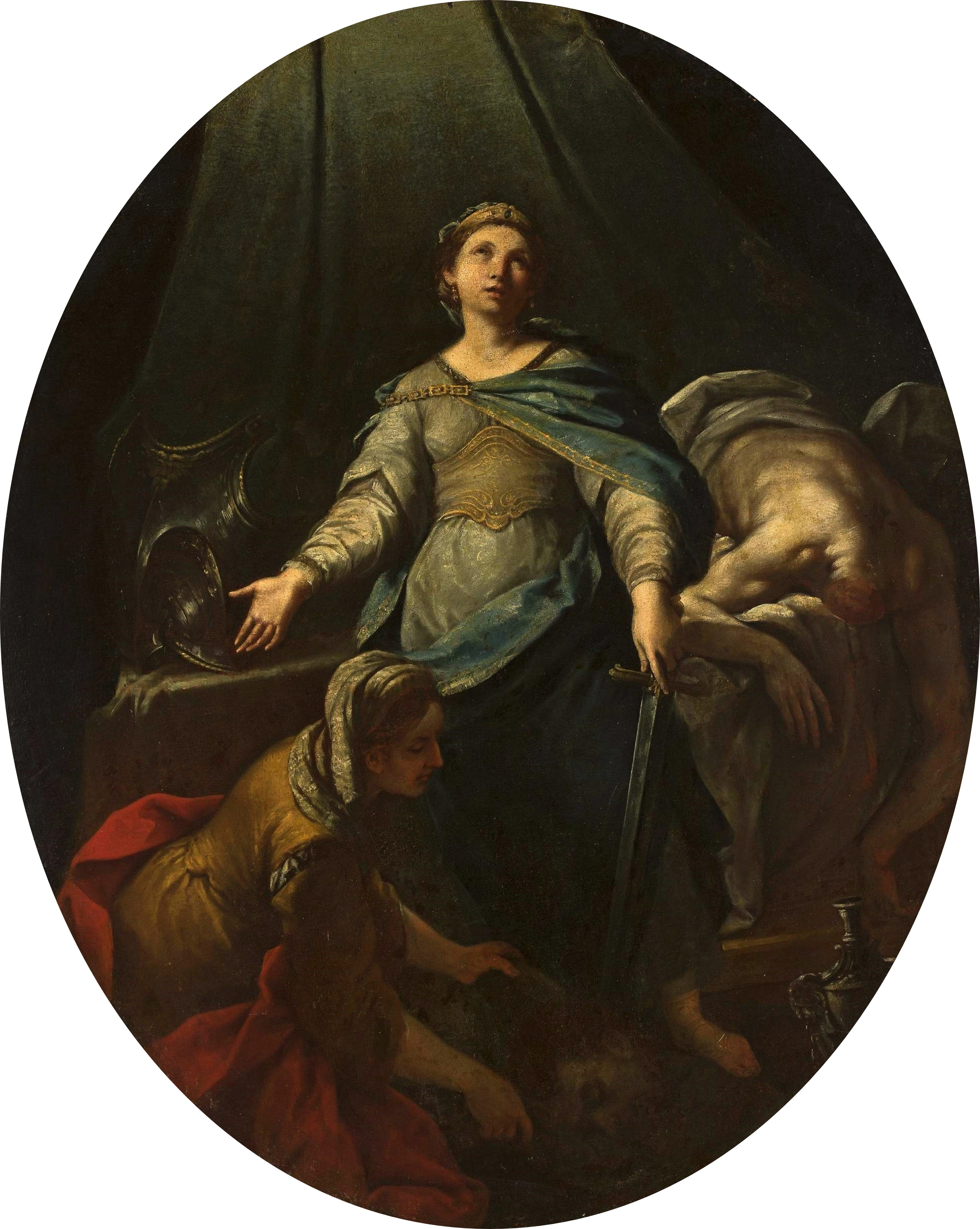
Judith with the head of Holofernes by Ercole Graziani the Younger, second quarter of the 18th century, National Museum in Warsaw

Ercole Graziani the Younger (1688–1765) was an Italian painter of the Baroque period, active mainly in Bologna and Piacenza.

== Biography ==
Ercole was a pupil of the painter Donato Creti and Marcantonio Franceschini. Pope Benedict XIV ordered a copy of his St. Peter consecrating St. Apollinaire (Bologna Cathedral) for the church of Sant'Apollinare in Rome.

He also painted altarpieces depicting respectively St. Simon Stock receives a scapular from the Virgin and St. Pietro Thoma for the first chapels to the left and right of the Church of the Carmine in Medicina.

Among his many pupils are Giuseppe Becchetti, Antonio Concioli, and Carlo Bianconi.
