= Giovanni Monevi =

Italian painter

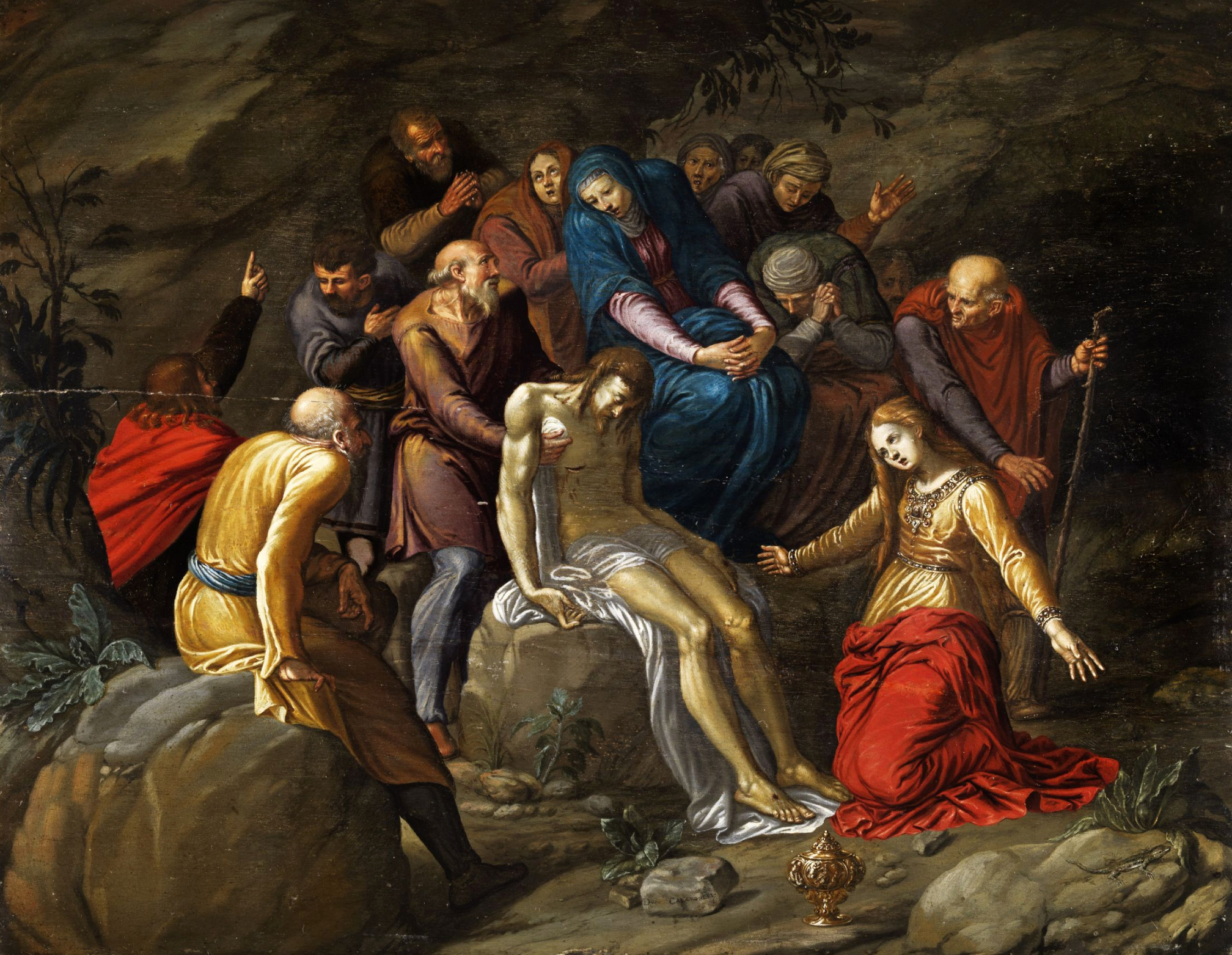
Entombment of Christ by Giovanni Moneri

Giovanni Monevi or Monevo (May 19, 1637 December 15, 1714) was an Italian painter of the Baroque period. The name Giovanni Moneri is used by a number of authors, but may reflect a misspelling.

== Biography ==
He was born in Visone, near Acqui, in the Piedmont. He was sent by his parents to Rome, to study under Giovanni Francesco Romanelli. He also studied in Turin. He returned in 1657 to paint an Assumption of the Virgin for the Cathedral of Acqui. In a chapel, he painted a scene of Paradise. He also painted scenes of the Life of St Francis in the cloister of church of San Francesco. He painted an Annuciation for the church in Terme Reali. He painted the main altarpiece Presentation of Mary at the Temple for the church of the Capuchins in Acqui Termi. A Last Supper is painted in the refectory of the Osservanti in Strevi. He also painted in the cloister of San Bernardino in Moncalvo.

His sons Giovanni Battista and Francesco were also a painter as well as a priest. The former, parish priest of Visone between 1690 and 1723, painted a San Rocco for a church in Acqui. The latter traveled to Rome to study, but died young.
