= Sant'Antonio dei Portoghesi =

Church of St. Anthony in Campo Marzio
- Santo António no Campo de Marte (in Portuguese); S. Antonii in Campo Martio (in Latin); S. Antonio in Campo Marzio (in Italian)
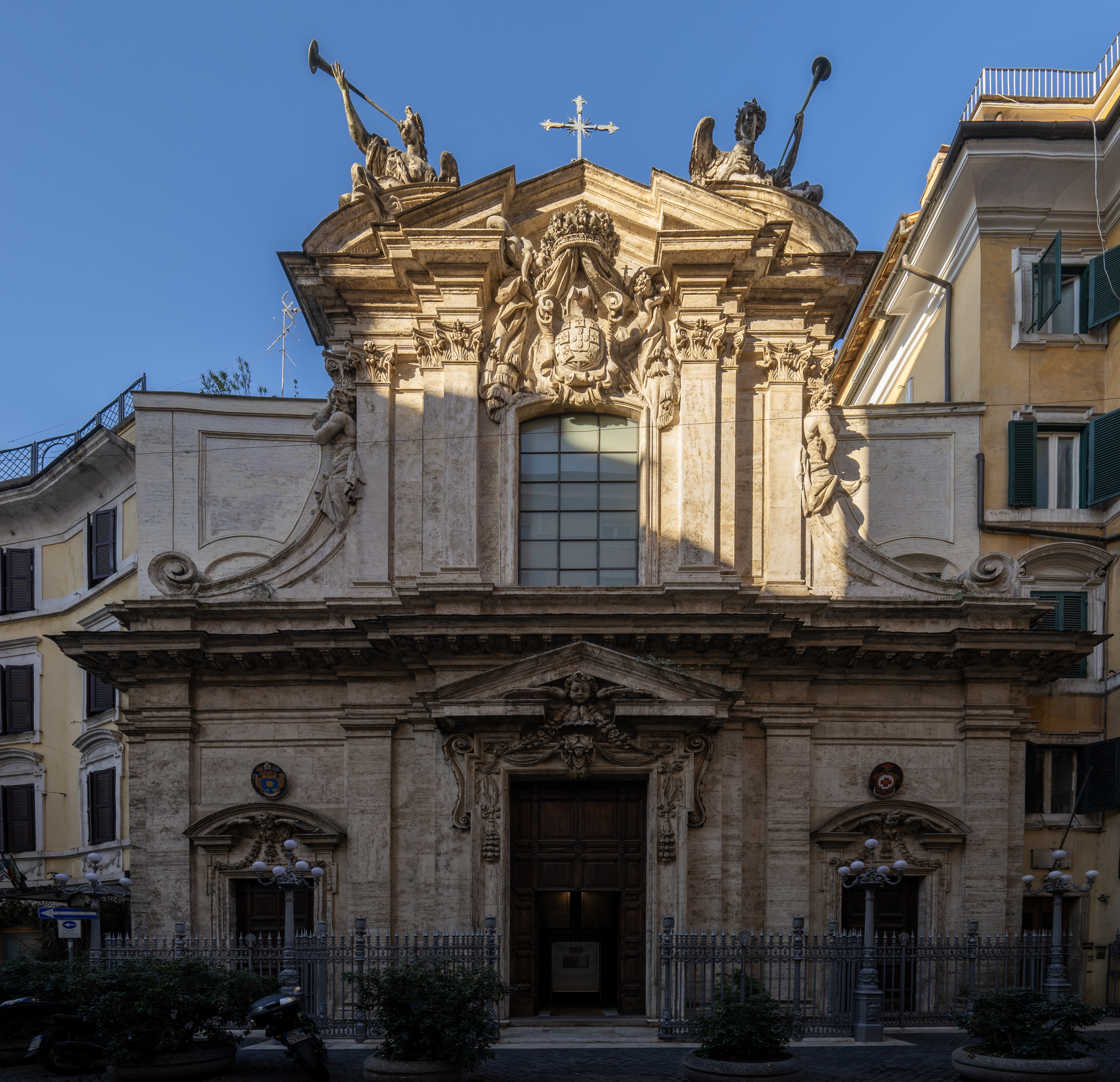
- Façade of the church of the National Church in Rome of Portugal.
- Click on the map for a fullscreen view
- 41°54′7.1″N 12°28′28.1″E
- Location: Via dei Portoghesi 2, Rome
- Country: Italy
- Denomination: Roman Catholic
- Tradition: Roman Rite
- Website: Official website

History
- Status: Titular church, national church
- Dedication: Anthony of Lisbon

Architecture
- Architect(s): Martino Longhi the Younger, Carlo Rainaldi, Cristoforo Schor
- Architectural type: Church
- Style: Baroque
- Completed: 17th century

Specifications
- Length: 30 metres (98 ft)
- Width: 20 metres (66 ft)

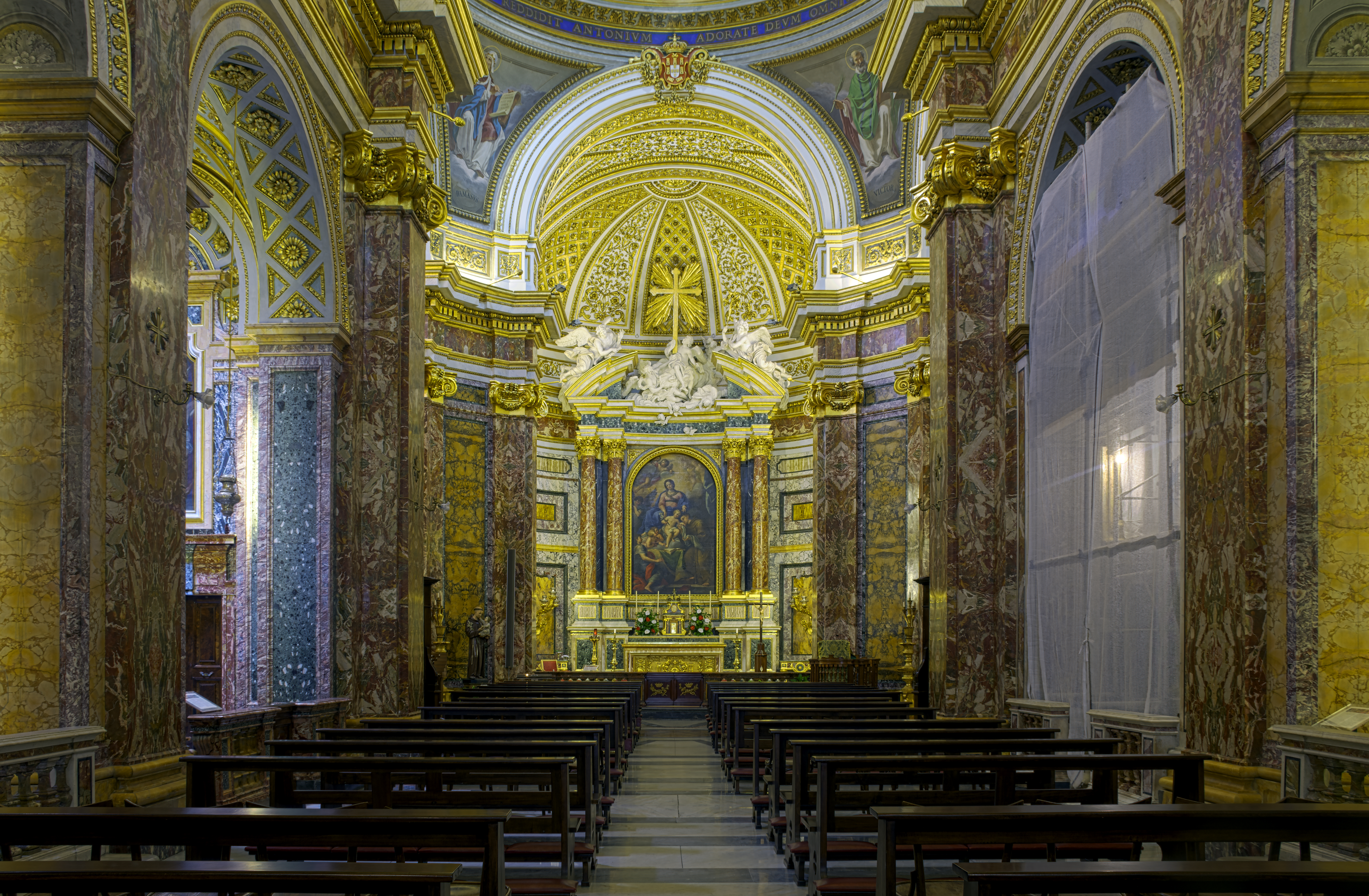
Nave of the church

The church of Saint Anthony in Campo Marzio, known as Saint Anthony of the Portuguese (Italian: Sant'Antonio dei Portoghesi, Portuguese: Santo António dos Portugueses), is a Baroque Roman Catholic titular church in Rome, dedicated to Saint Anthony of Lisbon. The church functions as a national church of the Portuguese community residing in that city and pilgrims visiting Rome and the Vatican. It also serves the Brazilian community.

Established as titulus S. Antonii in Campo Martio in 2001, it is currently assigned to Cardinal Manuel José Macário do Nascimento Clemente.

== History ==
The national church of the Portuguese people was originally founded in 1445 at the behest of Cardinal Antonio Martinez de Chaves adjacent to a hospice for Portuguese pilgrims. The hospice, with a small chapel dedicated to Our Lady of Bethlehem, had been founded in the fourteenth century by the noblewoman Guiomar of Lisbon. It was rebuilt in 1638 to a design by Martino Longhi the Younger. The ribbed dome was designed by Carlo Rainaldi in 1674. Work on the façade continued under Cristoforo Schor in 1695. The stained glass window above the door depicts St Anthony with the Child Jesus.

The church and hospice were closed in 1799 during Napoleon's occupation; the Portuguese government recovered the property in 1814. The hospice later became the Istituto Portoghese di Sant'Antonio in Roma which sponsors, language classes, conferences, and concerts. The church's main organ is located on the balcony over the entrance.

The barrel vault ceiling is stuccoed by Pompeo Gentile and frescoed by Salvatore Nobili. The interior is decorated in polychrome marble. The main altarpiece is Giacinto Calandrucci's 1707 The Virgin handing the Holy Child to St Anthony.

The first chapel on the left is dedicated to St. Anthony of Egypt; the second is the Chapel of the Nativity. It contains three artworks by Antonio Concioli: a Nativity, Adoration by the Magi, and Repose in Egypt. The Sampaio Chapel in the left transept is dedicated to the Immaculate Conception. It includes Pietro Bracci's 1750 funerary monument of Manuel Pereira de Sampaio, Portuguese ambassador to the Holy See and Governor of Sant'Antonio dei Portoghesi. A second monument, by Filippo della Valle, designed for the church is now at the Museu Nacional de Arte Antiga in Lisbon. The marble balustrade that enclosed the chapel was sold off by the French in 1807.

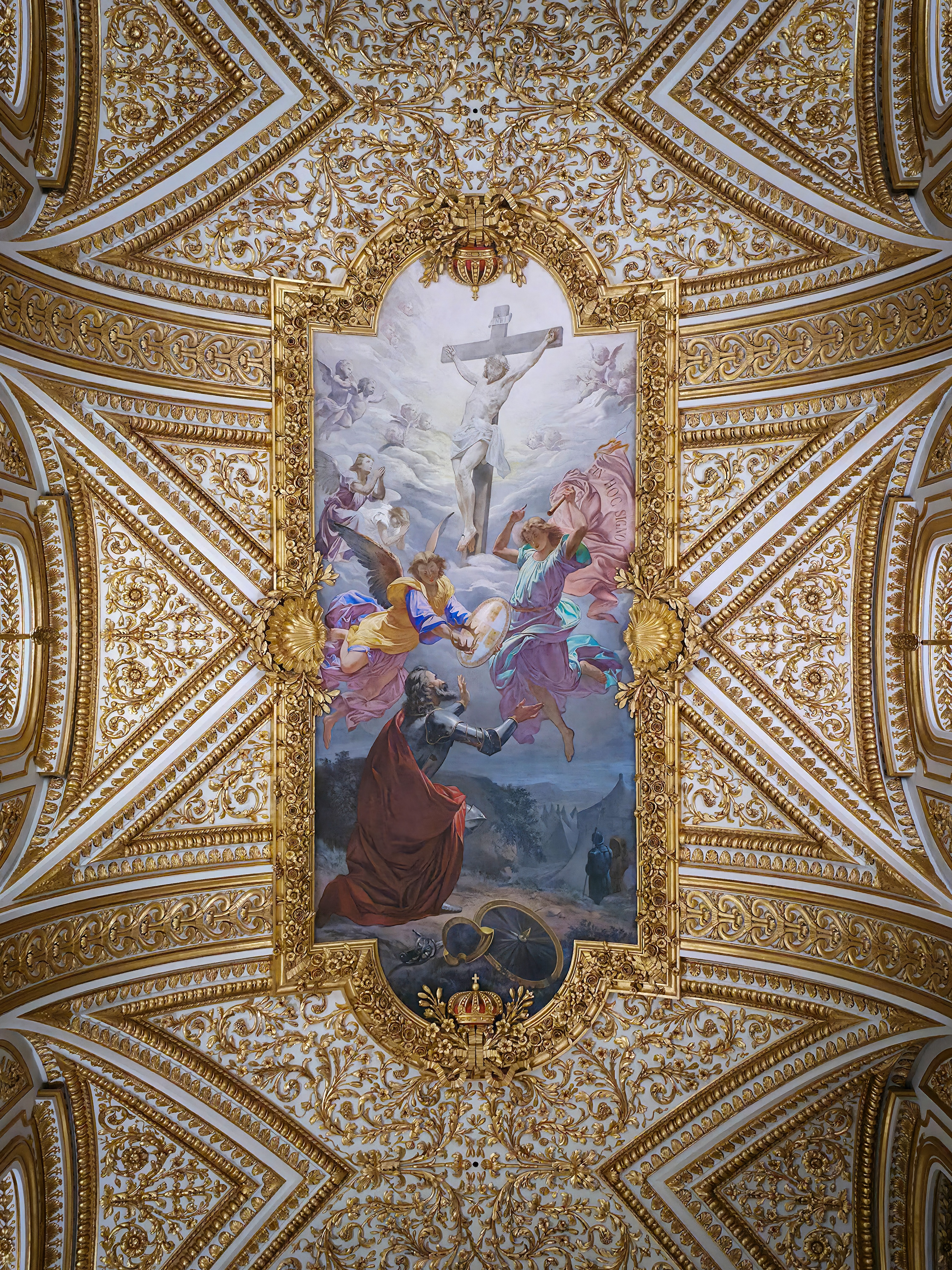
Ceiling mural

In the chapel of the left transept is preserved the Immaculate Conception by Jacopo Zoboli from 1756.

The chapel in the right transept is dedicated to St. Elizabeth of Portugal. The altarpiece of St Elizabeth is by Luigi Agricola. The first chapel on the right is dedicated to St Catherine of Alexandria and contains a neoclassic monument to Alexandre de Sousa Holstein sculpted by Antonio Canova in 1808; The second chapel on the right, the Cimini Chapel is dedicated to John the Baptist. The altarpiece is the Baptism of Christ by Calandrucci. The church interior was remodeled in the late eighteenth century.

== Cardinal-Priests ==
Since the 2001 consistory of Pope John Paul II, the church has been used as a titular church.

- José Policarpo (21 February 2001 – 12 March 2014)
- Manuel José Macário do Nascimento Clemente (14 Feb 2015 – present)
