= Jay Cimino =

American businessman (1936–2024)

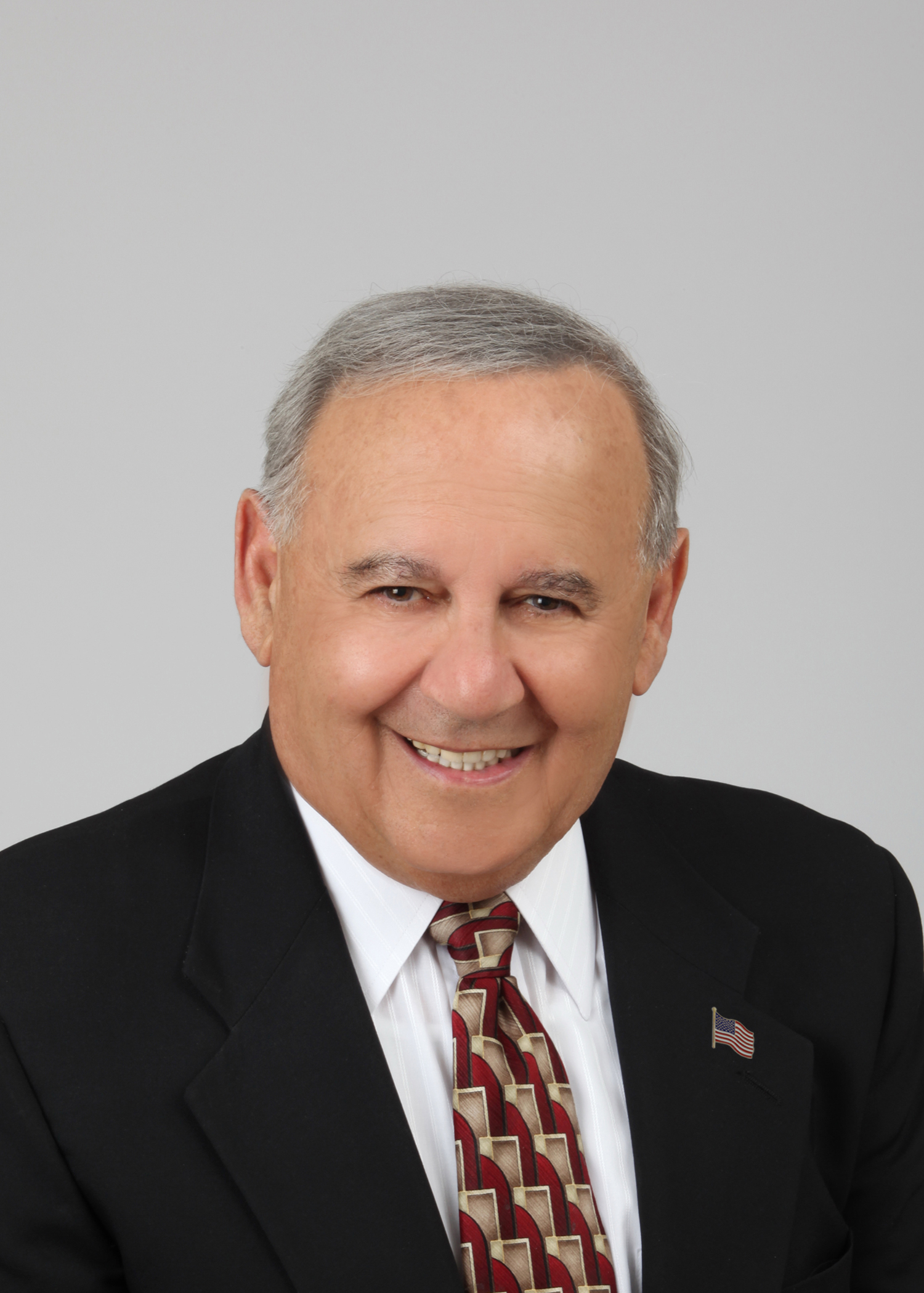
- Cimino in 2013
- Born: Gerald Dominic Cimino; April 20, 1936; Trinidad, Colorado, U.S.
- Died: February 24, 2024 (aged 87); Colorado Springs, Colorado, U.S.
- Occupations: CEO of Phil Long Automotive Group, Inc.
- Spouse: Emily Cimino (Roitz) (m. 1960)
- Children: 4

Gerald Dominic "Jay" Cimino (April 20, 1936 – February 24, 2024) was an American businessman from Trinidad, Colorado. He was best known locally for being the CEO of the Phil Long Automotive Group and for founding Mount Carmel Health, Wellness and Community Center. The former is the largest independently owned car dealership in Colorado. The latter is a 501c(3) nonprofit organization and his passion project. Cimino died on February 24, 2024, at the age of 87.

== History ==
Jay Cimino was born in 1936, and grew up in Trinidad. He followed his high school career with a brief stint in the United States Marine Corps before deciding to pursue higher education. Cimino began college at Trinidad State Junior College, and ended at the University of Denver. The October after college graduation, he was married to sweetheart Emily Roitz. He then dove headfirst into the automotive industry with a management position at B. F. Goodrich. His Bachelor's Degree in Business Administration was most famously put to use, however, when he partnered with automotive magnate Phil Long. Together, the entrepreneurial team expanded Phil Long Ford into an entire chain of successful dealerships. When Long died in 2001, Cimino continued to acquire and discard dealerships for the sake of the larger corporation.

== Family influence ==
Cimino's family has deep roots in the automotive industry, with five dealership-owning uncles influencing his career trajectory. Phil Long Dealerships is a family-run business. His son, Vince Cimino, is the General Manager of Audi Colorado Springs, a part of the Phil Long Family of Dealerships. Daughter Gina Cimino is the President of Mt. Carmel of Colorado, and oversees the two nonprofits Jay Cimino founded, Mt. Carmel Veterans Service Center in Colorado Springs, CO and Mt. Carmel Wellness & Community Center in Trinidad, CO. Her sibling, Laurie Cimino, is the Vice President of Phil Long Dealerships' insurance and compliance departments and operations.

== Military relations ==
The relationship with Colorado Springs's thriving military community has proven to be vital for Mr. Cimino's enterprises. In a 2011 interview, he estimated that local military personnel and their families account for 60% of his companies' business.

== Accolades ==
The Phil Long Community Fund, in collaboration with the Denver Broncos, built the playground in America the Beautiful Park. As a result, the park now contains a street named Cimino Drive (dedicated in 2003). His hometown of Trinidad opened the Jay Cimino Downtown Family Park and Playground in the summer of 2007. In 2011, Cimino was honored by Wards Auto with a Top 500 Dealer Profile. The aforementioned Mount Carmel Health, Wellness and Community Center also thrust Cimino into the local spotlight. Because of the center's contribution to Trinidad and the surrounding area, the Pikes Peak chapter of the American Red Cross selected Cimino as the humanitarian of the year for 2013.
