= Cimino family =

The Cimino family, Cimini or Cimina. Whether all beares of this name are related can most likely be dismissed, the variations of the spelling and transcript will vary from source to source, and as research goes on it may change the information in this article. The origin of the name is disputed, but it is certain that a branch of the family has taken the name from the Cimini Hills, in Latium. The origin of the Cimini name in this context goes back to the Etruscan era. The use of Cimini as a family name can be traced through history. In a study of family names in Roman Legions, the name DeCiminus is found C. Catullius DeCiminus of Troyes was a Roman Federal priest of the Roman Cult in 210 AD, who dies in Lyon. The name Ciminius is also documented in "Repertorium nominum gentilium et cognominum latinorum" The "Journal of Archaeology" states "Ciminius" as a known gentilitium nomina in ancient Rome. The ending "nius" is a clear indicator to the names Etruscan origin (which also may have the ending "na". C. Ciminius is registered as vicomagister of the vicus Silani Salienti (region XII) first half of the first century, under the reign of Claudius.

The family was important predominantly during the Middle Ages, both in the Papal states and Regno, the Kingdom of Naples. In Rome the family is noted for having a fortification in Forum Romanum, including half the Arch of Septimius Severus: Claustrum Cimini. The property consisted of a public road leading through the center of the arch. On the arch itself a tower existed as part of the fortification, which may have been the no longer used campanile of the church of Santi Sergio e Bacco. Cimini property also included a walled area around half the arch); the other half was in 1199 given by Pope Innocent III to the church of Santi Sergio e Bacco. The stronghold included a tower placed on top of the arch itself.

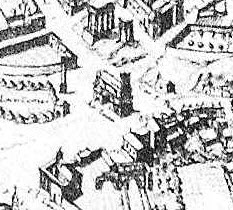
Ruins of Claustrum Cimini on Septimus Severus Arch

In 1181, Johannes de Cimino (1150–1212) was mentioned as Archbishop of Dublin. This Cimino is stated to be of English descent. In England and Ireland known as John Comyn, he was consecrated priest on 21 March 1182 in Lazio in Velletri, Lazio. Johannes de Cimino is attributed with founding St. Patrick's Cathedral, after demolishing the existing church.

Carolino Cimini find himself in prison in Lucca in 1325, due to the war with Florence.

In Roman Campagna there is till this day the ruins of a strong hold, built on the remains of an ancient Roman villa, called "Cimino" after Pietro Cimino, who owned lands in this area in 1385.

The family achieved additional nobility in Regno (historical name of the Kingdom of Naples) at the end of 1267. Bartolomeo is registered to be in the kingdom 1280. In 1290 Nicolo Cimino was made tax collector in Calabria. Tommaso, Pietro and Riccardo inherit the feudal lands of Rinaldo and a certain Filippo Cimino is made adviser (consigliere) in Vico.

In 1273 three Cimino brothers, Tomaso, Pietro and Rinaldo, were sent to L'Aquila. In 1423 Urbano Marino Cimino was given as a gift, from the crown, half the territory of Gabella della Garaffa dei Passi d'Abruzzi, Gabella dei Flagello and a castle in the upper part of Salerno. Urbano was made governor with royal mandate during the time queen Giovanna had left the crown to Renato d'Angio. Renato left the governing of the crown to 16 governors, until he could resume the crown, of which Urbano Cimino was one.

In October 1559, from Isabella di Toledo, widow of the count Francesco Spinelli, and as the guardian of the Lady Francesca Spinelli the single daughter and single heir of the count, sold, with Royal consent, the land of Caccuri to Giovanni Bernardino Cimino for the sum of 16500 ducati. The estate passed to his son Giulio Ceasare Cimino in 1569. / Due to financial issues the estate transfers to the hands of Francesco Carafa and then to Camillo Sersale, and then back to a certain Franceso Cimino in 1589, for the sum of 15000 ducati. Attributed to the bad government of Spinelli and also a terrible plague that spread in 1528 in neighboring Cerenzia, many people of the country abandoned Caccuri and transferred mostly, to St. Giovanni in Fiore. Cimino with the bad government continuing, indeed, became suffocating beyond measure and to aggravate the conditions of caccuresi contributed a massive presence of the clergy of the people. Just think that in 1621, for a population of just 800 inhabitants there were as many as 18 priests under the archpriest, the priest and the monks of St. Dominic, St. Francis and the Abbey of St. Bernard. In 1638 there was a terrible earthquake and floods and hailstorms in 1679 completely destroyed the crops, with the follow next year famine. Perhaps to avoid these evils ingratiating the favor of Mary, a group of caccuresi churches, with the aid of Father Provinciale of Preachers, the granting of a room of the Convent to erect a chapel, the congregation of the Holy Rosary.The congregation of Our Lady of the Rosary, in time, became more and more important, in fact, July 24, 1824, obtained from Pope Leo XII that anyone would visit the church during the feast of the Holy Rosary and every Sunday of the year acquire a plenary indulgence which gave cause to a massive presence of pilgrims from the countries neighboring provinces. Givannibattista Cimino, because of their debts, lost in 1651 the entire estate, which was bought at auction by Antonio Cavalcanti. Giovanni Battista Vico (1668–1744) wrote a sonnet to: "Del Cavalier Francesco Cimini" and "Poesie del P. Antonio Cimini".

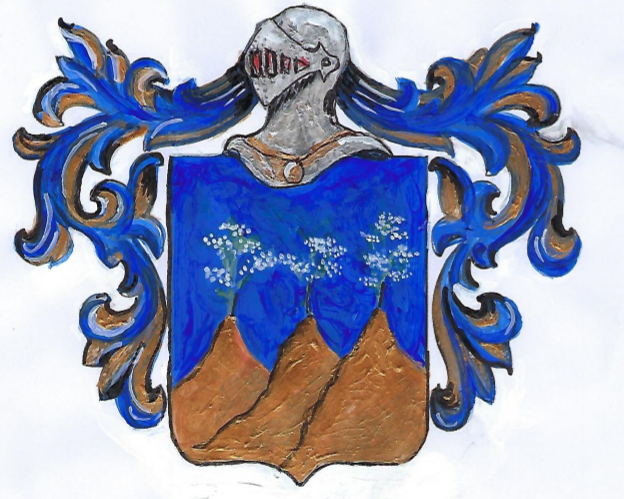
Cimini di Messina, Coat of Arms, Cimini hill, w three peeks, with cumin plant on each

A certain Leonardo Cimini moved from Orvieto to Messina, Sicily, and joined in matrimony with the noble family of Calasali from Messina. Leonardos son Pietro lived in Noto, whose son Giacomo was made Patrizio of his homeland by King Martino and the queen Maria, in 1396. His son Giovanni became a lawyer and was promoted by King Alfonso to the office of "Avocato Fiscale del Regno". Giovanni's son Giacomo became several times "Capitano" and "Ciurato". King Ladislas sent to Calabria Nicola Cimini as deputy treasurer for the whole of the duchy

Among the important families of Rome in 1500, the Cimini family is mentioned, living in the Colonna region. Among the noble families of Vico Equense the family of Cimini is registered in 1671. A branch of this family achieved sovereign privileges 10 March 1586, in Taranto, and also recorded as "Patrizia" there. Tommasso Cimini was recorded coming to Lucera in 1605, where he married Barbara Tauro, of a distinguished Luceran family, and had their son Giuseppe. The family is mentioned in the "Capella gentilizia de Signora Cimino nella Chiesa de PP. Cappoccini di Lucera". On 27 October 1788, a branch of the Cimino family were created as Marquis of terra di Casolla Valenzano.

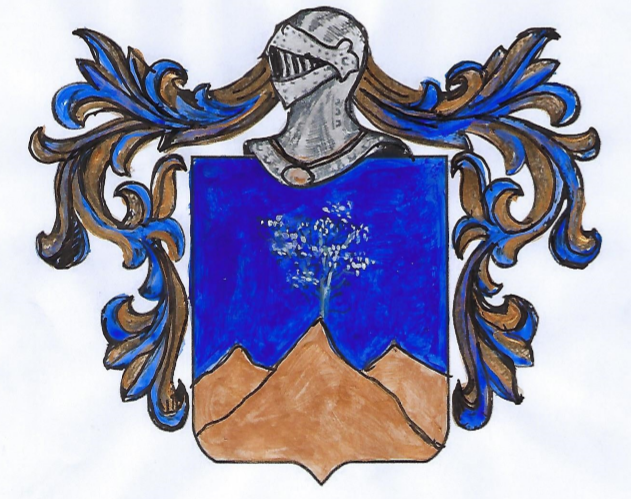
Cimini di Tropea, Much like the Arms of the older family of Messina,

This family is also registered as part of the nobility in Tropea. In 1670 the family was registered among the barons and feudal lords of Abruzzo Citra Cimino was counted among the families of the Carafa family in 1700 referenced relations to. In 1738 "Cimini" is registered among the important families of Opi of Abbruzzi.

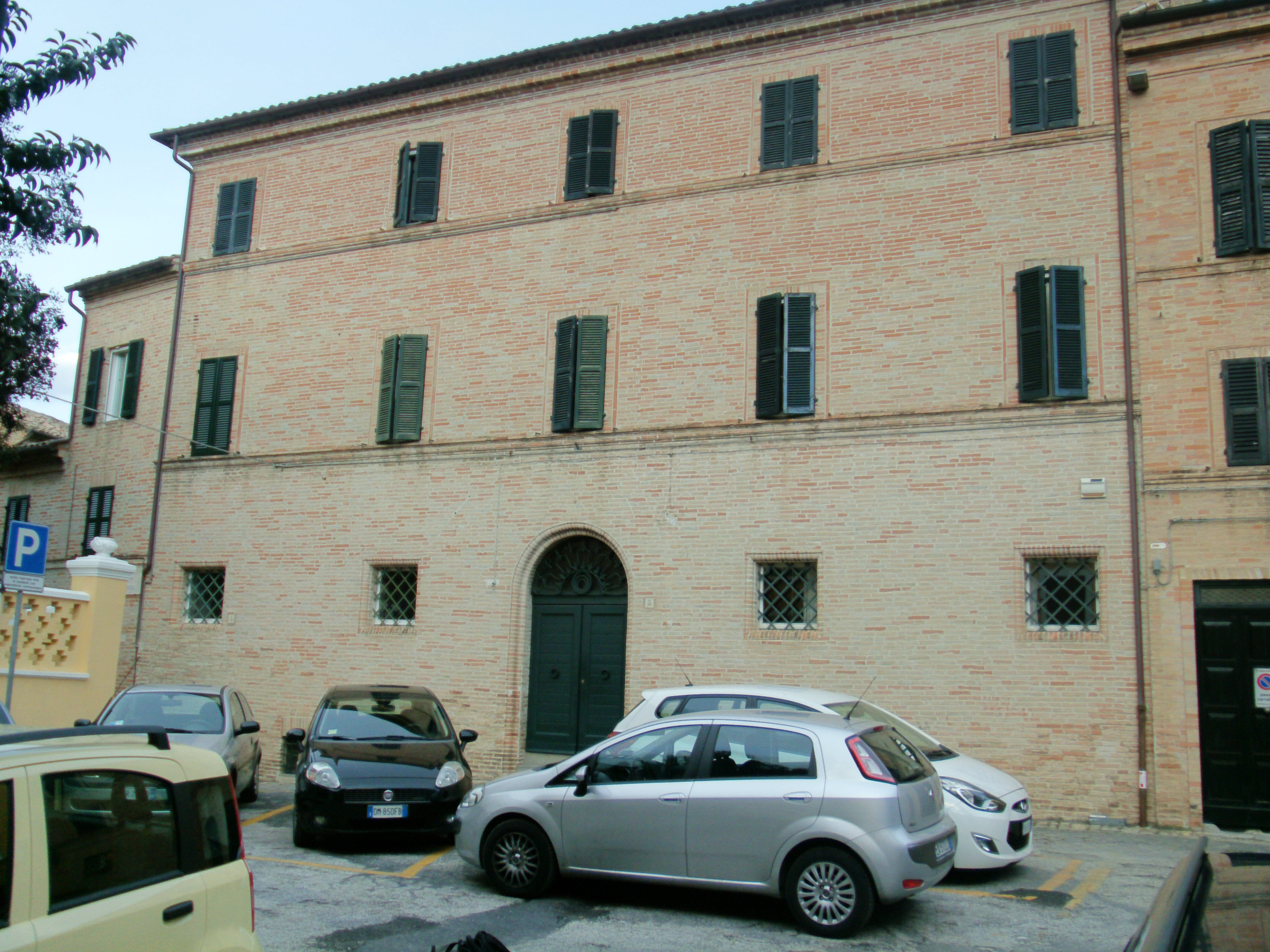
17th Century Palazzo Cimini, Recanati

in 1664 the catasti Briotti of Recanati showed the Cimini household value of 3860 libbre. This branch of the Cimini family was aggregated to be included among the nobility of Recanati in year 1710. Again nobility was recognized by the Order of Malta in 1776 The Palace of the Cimini family in Recanati is from the 18th century, in its current state, Palazzo Belli-Nicoletti

== Notable family members ==
=== 1st century ===
- C. Ciminius, vicomagister, Viator Sodalium Augustalium, Rome

=== 2nd century ===
- C. Cattullius DeCiminus, Roman Federal Priest, Lyon

=== 12th century ===
- Johannes de Cimino (1150–1212) (this spelling of John Comyn is only found once in a papal bull of 1183), Archbishop of Dublin 1181, consecrated in Velltri, Lazio, Italy the same year.

=== 13th century ===
- Pietro Cimino di Rieti, sells 124 sheep and 13 goats at the price of 116 lire, in May 1295 in Rome, to Nicolucio di Leonardo of Perugia
- Nicolo Jacapo de Cimini, Nobleman of Rione di Colonna in Rome

=== 14th century ===
- Giovanni Battista Cimini, made Bishop of Vico Equense year 1300, by Pope Boniface VIII Giovanni Battista, lays the foundation for the chapel "San Gio. Evangelisti". He died in 1343, and is buried in the chapel in an elaborate marble sarcophagus.
- Rinaldo di Giovanni Cimini di Rieti, imperiali auctoritate notarius, Notary in Rieti.

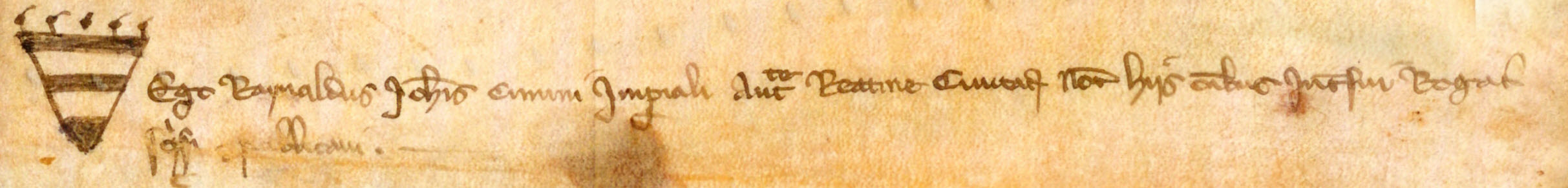
Signum di Raynoldo Cimini di Rieti, 30 Aug, 1310

- Thomaselius de Ciminis, mentioned in "Regestum Clementis Papae V. (annus Primus - annus nonus), 1305-1314
- Rufino de Cimino, archdeacon of Tolensis, papal Nunzio for pope John XXII to kingdom of Hungry, 1317-1320
- Tommasso de Ciminis, Canon of Rieti d. ca 1340
- Pietro Cimino owns many lands and a tower in Campagna Romana,
- Cecco di Gianni Cimini, of Rome, Podestà of Rieti, noted in the war between Castelfranco and Rieti 1394

=== 15th century ===
- Serafino Cimini di Bazzano, (Abruzzo), alias Serafino dei Ciminelli, alias Serafino dell'Aquila (1466–1500), famous Italian poet and member of the Knights Hospitallers.

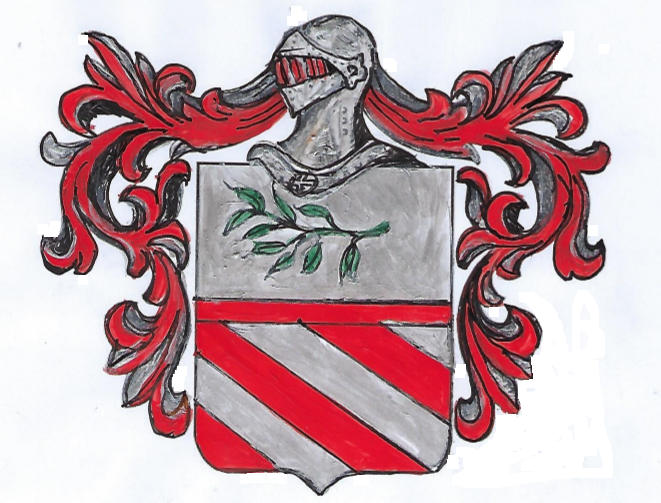
Coat of Arms, Ciminelli di Bazzano, alias Cimini, originating from Rieti

- Giambattista Cimini, Nuncio to Spain under popes Clemens IV and Clemens X, he later became bishop of Lodi and Acquapendente
- Giovanni Cimino da Noto, Avvocato Fiscali della Magna Curia ossia della Gran Corte, in 1424,
- Cimino Giorgio Notary Public, the Kingdom of Candia (1480-1500)

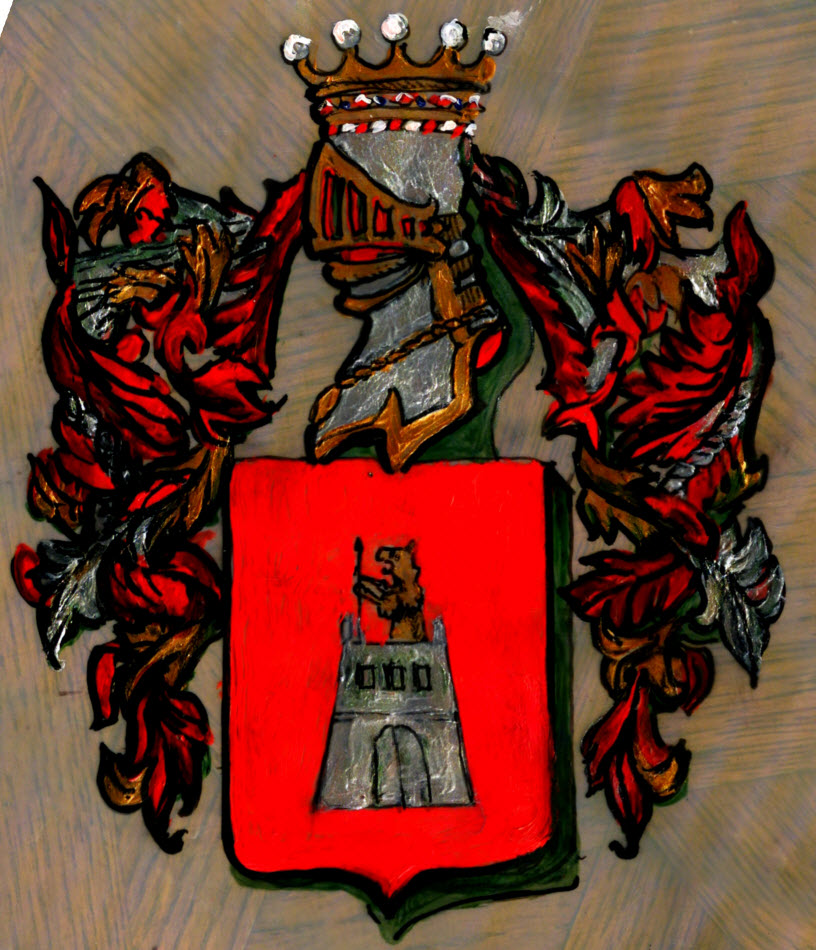
Coat of arms of the Cimini family, Central Italy

=== 16th century ===
- Bernardino Cimino, Baron of Caccuri in 1559 .
- Giulio Ceasare Cimini, Baron of Caccuri in 1569 .
- Giouan Giacomo Cimino, Nobili di Noto, Licata and Terranova. Used as reference for Knights of Malta to prove nobility for Fra Dr Francesco Maria Gregni in 1616, whose mother was Geronima Cimino daughter of the above mentioned Giouan Giacomo Cimino. Coat for Arms noted as "Un monte diuise in tre parti da doue nascono tre piante di cimino", which is consistent with the arms of the cimini family of Messina.

=== 17th century ===
- Paolo Cimino, Baron of Curaro, 1609 in Napoli
- Scipone Cimino, Tropea +1567 Notarius Publicus (1616–1627),
- Francesco Cimino, Baron of Caccuri partly sponsoring the Carmelite mission to Persia in 1604 Francesco Cimino also wanted to sponsor the setting up of an educational center in Rome to teach Turkish prisoners the Christianity and then send the back to Turkey as missionaries, he was instead convinced to sponsor the recapture of Mount Carmel, the founding place of the order of the Carmelites. He also sponsored a convent in Rome for the Carmelite order. an Epigraph with the following text can be seen: Illustrissimo domino Francesco Cimino Baroni de Caccuri Nepolitano quod seminarii Carmel discalceat ad fidei propagationem primus fuerit ex aere fundator
- Giovanni Battista Cimino, Mayor of Tropea 1671

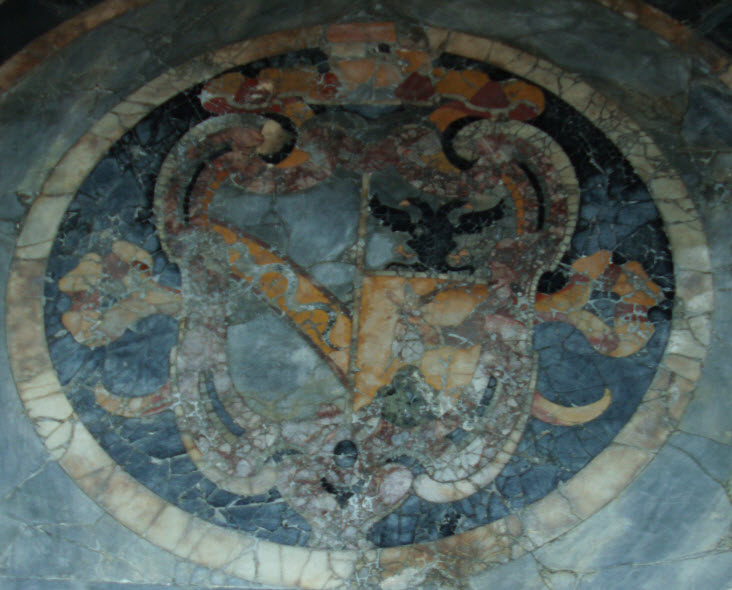
Cimini di rione Colonna, Sant'Antonio dei Portoghesi, Rome

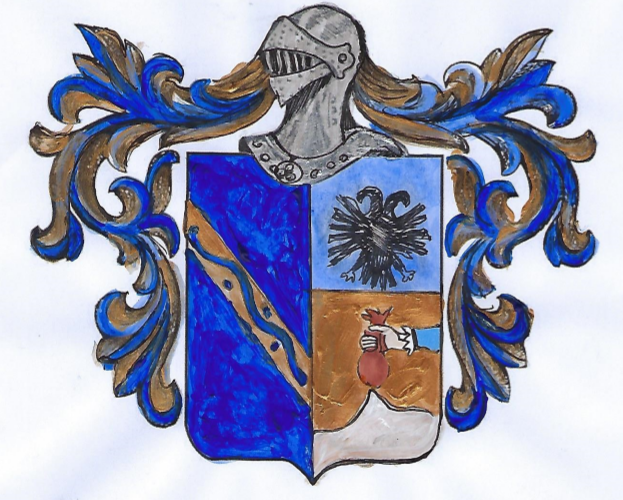
Coat of arms found in Sant'Antonio dei Portoghesi, Cimini-Raimundi

Antonio Cimini owner of a chapel in S. in Collescipoli, near Terni.

- Giovanni Battista Cimini of Rione Colonna, Rome, Papal perfumist, and donator of in Sant'Antonio dei Portoghesi in Rome, which center piece was carved by Giacinto Calandrucci (1646–1707).
- Antonio Cimino, Notarius Publicus, Tropea (1679–1713)
- Giovanni Battista Cimino. Sr, Notarius Publicus, (1636–1689) Tropea
- Dottore Francesco Maria Cimino, Cavaliere dell'Ordine di Calatrava ed Accademico degli Arditi Cavalier Francesco Cimino is also known through the sonnet attributed to him by Giambattista Vico
- Carlo Antonio Cimini, 1632 Baron of Opi, Abruzzo * Lucia Cimini, opera singer in Venice, noted for the role of "Berenice" in 1673, and referred to as "that miraculous virtuosa".
- Nicolo Cimino, Knights Hospitaller, 29 February 1692, Priory of Capua
- Lorenzo Cimini, Nobleman - donate an important stautue of Saint Severino to the church of Santa Maria Maggiore in Collescipoli

Cimini Coat of arms Capella Cimini, Santa Maria Maggiore, Collescipoli

- Antonio Cimini who owned the Cimini Chapel at, had the new frontal made in fine Cottanello marble, based on a design by Tommaso Cardani and by the stonemason Michele. Under the altar, which bears the coat of arms of the Cimini family (depicting cumin (Cuminum cyminum) on the two lateral plinths, is the urn of St. Severino martyr, in painted and gilded wood.

=== 18th century ===
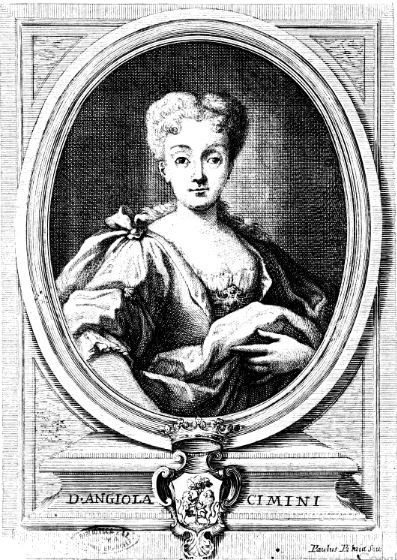
Angiola Cimini, with the coat of arms of the Cimini di Regno

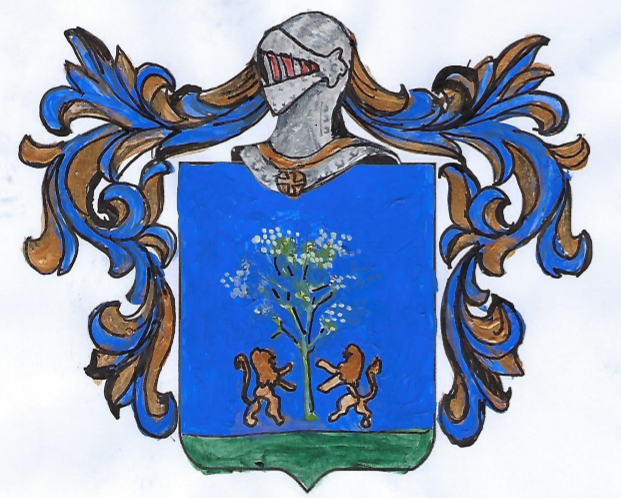
Coat of arms, Cimini di Regno

- Angiola Cimini, Marchesana della Petrella, 1700–1727, Famous Italian noble woman through her friendship with Giambattista Vico, who wrote an epilogue to her funeral in 1727
- Giovanni Battista Cimino. Jr, Notarius Publicus, (1720–1773) Tropea
- Giovanni Battista Cimini, Priori
- Edoardo Cimini, was made Marquis by Charles VI (Luxemburg, 2 May 1733). He also acquired the title "Patrizio é di Crotone"
- Sister Angela Cimini, from Spiano outside Teramo, Abruzzi.
- Gaetano Cimini born in Maiori 1753 married with Maria Amatruda. Paper factory owner.
- Pasqual Cimino, Notarius Publicus, (1720–1779) Tropea
- Giovanni Battista Cimini, Civic Senate as of Noble dignity in Recanati. mentioned in the census of nobles 12 August 1776, as requested by the Order of Malta, Priory of Rome.

=== 19th century ===
- Francesco Cimini. Paper factory owner in Amalfi, 1800. Leaves Italy seeking fortune in Peru.

=== 20th century ===
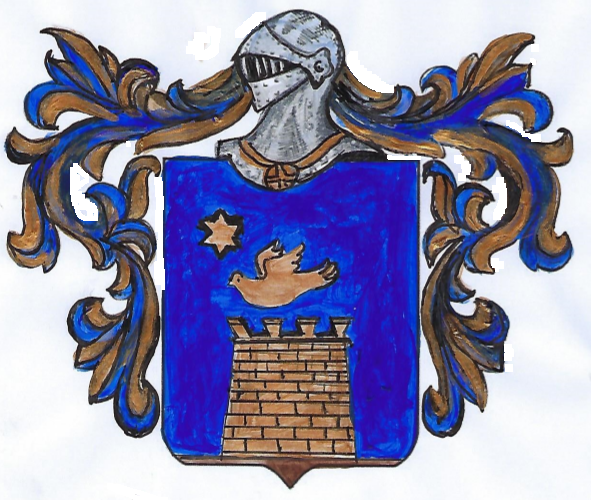
Cimino, Coat of Arms

- Serafino Cimino da Capri, Minister General of the "Order of Friars Minor" (Franciscans) (1915–1921), Apostolic Delegate in Mexico (1924–1925), Titular Archbishop of Cyrrhus (1924–1928), Apostolic Nuncio to Peru (1925–1928)
- Dr. Stefano Della Pietra Cimini. Mayor of Maiori 2005–2009

== Sources ==
- Aldimari, Biagio, (1691) "Memorie Historiche di Diverse Familglie Nobili,..."
- Aldimari, Biagio, (1700) "Historie Genealogica della famiglia Carafa"
- Annales Hibernie ab anno Christi 1162 useque ad annum 1370
- Anderson, Gerald H. (1998), "Biographical Dictionary of Christian Missions"
- "Archivio della Società romana di storia patria", (1887), volume 10, page 391.
- "Archivo di Stato di Vibo Valentia"
- Barrio, Gabriele; Dommenico Murratorii, "Gabrielis Barrii Francicani De antiquitate, & situ Calabriae libri quinque" Rome, 1737
- Bellucci, A, Inventario dell'Archivio Communale di Rieti
- Bibliotecha Nazionale Fiorentino, "Cod 44 Cl 25 Magl. A carta 80"
- Bonazzi, Francesco (1902), "Familie Nobili E Titolate Del Napolitano"
- Bonazzi, Francesco, "Elenco Dei Cavalieri del S.M Ordine Di S. Giovanni Di Gerusalemme, Parte Prima"
- Bretano, Robert (1991), "Rome Before Avignon", UNIVERSITY OF CALIFORNIA PRESS, 1991.
- Brentano, Robert (1994), "A New World in a Small Place Church and Religion in the Diocese of Rieti"
- Castelli, Vincenzo, "Fasti di Sicilia", Giuseppe Pappalarbo, MESSINA, 1820, page 449.
- Cimino, Maria Francesco, Il Ritratto del Principe del dottor D. Francesco Maria Cimino, Napoli, 1697
- Crété-Protin, Isabelle "Église et vie chrétienne dans le diocèse de Troyes du IVe au IXe siècle" 2002
- Collegio Araldico (1926) "Rivista del Collegio Araldico"
- Collegio Araldico (1935) "Rivista del Collegio Araldico"
- Corsigignani, Pietro-Antonio, 1738, "Reggia Marsicana ovverno Memorie Topografico-Storiche"
- Cutolo, Alessandro, 1969, "Re Ladislao D'angio Durazzo".
- De Rossi, Giovanni Maria,1981, "Torri medievali della Camapagna Romana" page 346.
- Di Marino, Andrea "La famiglia d'Horatio ed il suo possesso del feudo di Opi"
- Docartis,
- Family Tree DNA,
- Galeota, D. Giacomo Capece, 1671, "Descrittione Del Regno di Napoli"
- Galasso, Giuseppe; Economia e societá delle Calabria de Quinquecento. Milano 1975.
- Ganocsy, Antonio, DIATRIBE in Dissertationem Historico-Criticam de S.Ladislao Hungariae Rege, Fundatore Episcopatus Varadiensis,1777
- Genetic history of Europe, Genetic history of Europe
- "GCatholic.org" Archived 2015-02-12 at the Wayback Machine
- Gregorovius, History of the city of Rome in the Middle Ages [Hamilton, Trad.]. 1894. Volume 7, Pt.
- Hanafi, Zakeiya, 2000, "The Monster and the Machine"
- Hinterhöller, Monika, "Der Triumphbogen des Septimius Severus und die historischen Reliefs der Partherkrieg", 2008, GRIN Verlag
- Hûlsen, Christina, and Carter, JEsse Benedict, "The Roman forum: its history and its monuments" 1909, Loescher
- Lanhers, Yvonne "Regestum Clementis papae V" Typographia Vaticana, 1957
- Lindley, Richard Dean, "A Study of the Cognomina of Soldiers in the Roman Legions", Page 167, Princeton University, 1916.
- Marino-Montero, homepage
- Michelet, Giulio. Opere Di Giambattista Vico 2, Napoli 1834,
- Minutolo, Andrea (1699). Memorie del gran priorato di Messina. Nella Stampario Camerale di Vicenzo D'Amico.
- Moroni, M (1978), "Rivista di Studi Marchigiani, Nobilità Recanaese Nell'età Moderna"
- Moroni Romano, Gaetano, 1860, "Dizionario di Erudizione Storico-Ecclesiastica"
- Da Mosto, ANDREA, L'ARCHIVIO DI STATO DI VENEZIA, INDICE GENERALE, STORICO, DESCRITTIVO ED ANALITICO, PALAZZO RICCI-ROMA-PIAZZA RICCI, 1937.
- Mugnos, Philadelo (1607–1675) "Teatro genologico delle famiglie de' regni di Sicilia ultra e citra"
- Parascandolo, Gaetano, "Monografia del comune di Vico-Equense", page 346, Napoli 1858.
- Ragosta, Rosabla, Napoli, "Città della seta: produzione e mercato in età moderna", Meridiana Libri srl Roma, 2009, page 64
- Rugiero, Domenico, Feste e riti Cccuri, tradizione e modernitá,(2013)Morbida.
- Rupke, Jörg, "Fasti Sacerdotum" Oxford University Press, Oxford, 2008
- Salvati, Fabrizio (2006), Castelfranco:tra Stato Pontificio e Regno di Napoli- Orizzonti trimestrale dei beni civici di Vazia Rieti - Google translation
- Selfridge-Field, Eleonor, "A New Chronology of Venetian Opera and related Gengres, 1660-1760", Stanford, California, 2007.
- Solin, Heikki et Salomies, Olli "Repertorium nominum gentilium et cognominum latinorum", Olms, 1994. Page 250.
- Squarti Perla, Angelo, "Titolo e Nobilita nelle Marche", 2002 E.V. 2755 ab Urbe Condita, page 124.
- Toraldo, Felice, "Il Sedile e la Nobilità di Tropea con Genealogie, documenti e tavole"
- The Archaeological Journal volume 45, Royal Archaeological Institute., 1888, page 181
- Troyli, Placid, 1752, page 116."Istoria Generale del Reame di Napoli"
- Sopronii,1815, page 70,"Catalogus Manuscriptorum Bibliothae Nationais Hungaricae"
- Villarosa, Carlo Antonio de Rosa (1841), Notizie Di Alcuni Cavalieri del Sacro Ordine Gerosolimitano Illusri Per Lettere E Per Belle Arti"
