= Antonio Concioli =

Italian painter (1739–1820)

Antonio Concioli (1739 – November 28, 1820) was an Italian painter, mainly depicting sacred subjects in a Neoclassical style.

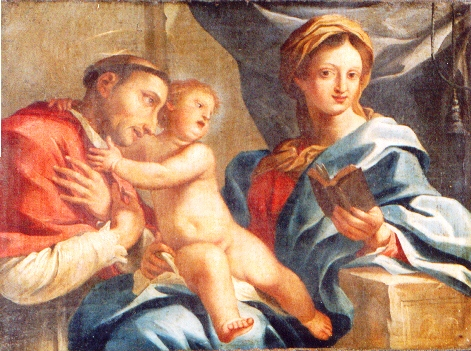
Madonna and Child with St Carlo Borromeo (Collection in Genoa)

== Biography ==
Born in Pergola, Marche, to a family of professionals and bureaucrats, he was likely a descendant of the jurist, Antonio Concoli of Cantiano (1602–1680). He initially trained in Bologna under Ercole Graziani and Ercole Lelli, but soon traveled to Rome under the patronage of Cardinal Andrea Negroni. He obtained a post as professor in the Academy of Design at the hospice in San Michele a Ripa, and for which he would also become director of the Tapestry works. In Rome, he was also a pupil of Pompeo Batoni. He became a member of the Academy of St Luke in Rome in 1781. He painted an altarpiece for the church of Sant'Antonio dei Portoghesi in Rome. He painted a portrait of Cardinal Giuseppe Maria Doria Pamphilj Landi. He was also active in Rieti. He died in Rome in 1820.
