= Cimini (surname) =

Cimini is an Italian surname. Notable people with the surname include:

- Angiola Cimini, Marchesana della Petrella (1700–1727), Italian noble
- Anthony Cimini (1922–1987), American politician
- Giacomo Cimini (born 1977), Italian film director
- Paolo Cimini (born 1964), Italian cyclist
