= Palazzo Lante =

Coordinates: 41°53′51.9″N 12°28′31.1″E

- Palazzo Medici Lante
- Interactive map of Palazzo Lante

General information
- Location: Rome, Italy

Palazzo Lante, also known as either Palazzo Medici Lante or Medici Lante della Rovere, is a Renaissance-style aristocratic palace located on Piazza Dei Caprettari #72, near the church of Sant'Eustachio in the rione named after the church in central Rome, Italy. Presently the palace houses both the offices of the national Institute of Nuclear Physics and the Institute of Culture Pantheon.

== Description ==
Construction of the palace at the site was begun in 1513 under the ownership of Giuliano de' Medici, Duke of Nemours, then captain general of the Roman Catholic church and relative of the pope. The project was initially conceived by Jacopo Sansovino, including the elegant courtyard with fountains, but work remained incomplete for nearly 70 years, when it was purchased by Ludovico Lante, who completed the structure and whose name is inscribed on the portal. His son would marry Lucrezia della Rovere, heir of the family of Pope Julius II. Under the Cardinal Marcello Lante della Rovere the work by Lunghi and Romanelli were completed.

The palace was linked to a palace once owned by the Cenci family with facade on the parallel Via del Teatro Valle, under the design of Onorio Lunghi. The frescoed lunettes in the piano nobile, depicting episodes and legends from Ancient Roman history, are by Giovanni Francesco Romanelli. The subjects include the Story of Mars and Venus, Allegory of Truth discovered by Time, Romus and Remulus, Numa Pompilius, Cincinnati, Oath of the Horatii, Kidnapping of Sabines, Diana, and the Allegories of Po and Tiber.

The palace was sold off by heirs of the Della Rovere family in the late 19th century.
