= Angiola Cimini, Marchesana della Petrella =

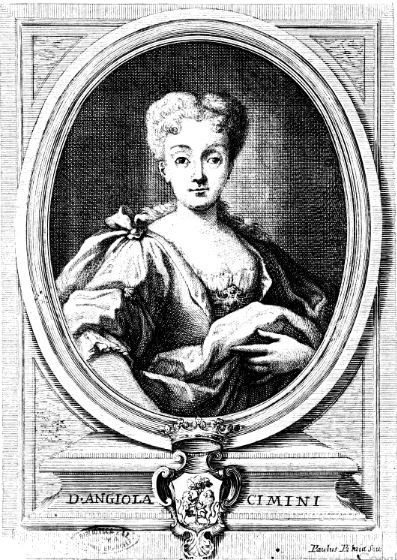
Angiola Cimini

Angiola Cimini (1700–1727) was the daughter of Italian nobleman, Giuseppi Cimino, avvocato fiscale del real patrimonio, and of Anna d'Arieta-Crespo, member of a noble family from Castigliana. She is most famous due to her friendship with the philosopher Giambattista Vico. He wrote a eulogy for her funeral in 1727 that is stated to be a "gem of eloquence", Angiola died at the age of 27. Sent to a school for Spanish noble ladies, Angiola was adored among her schoolmates for her ability to heal their ailments. She married to become the Marchioness of Petrella.
