= Rembrandt's prints =

Rembrandt's entire output as an engraver

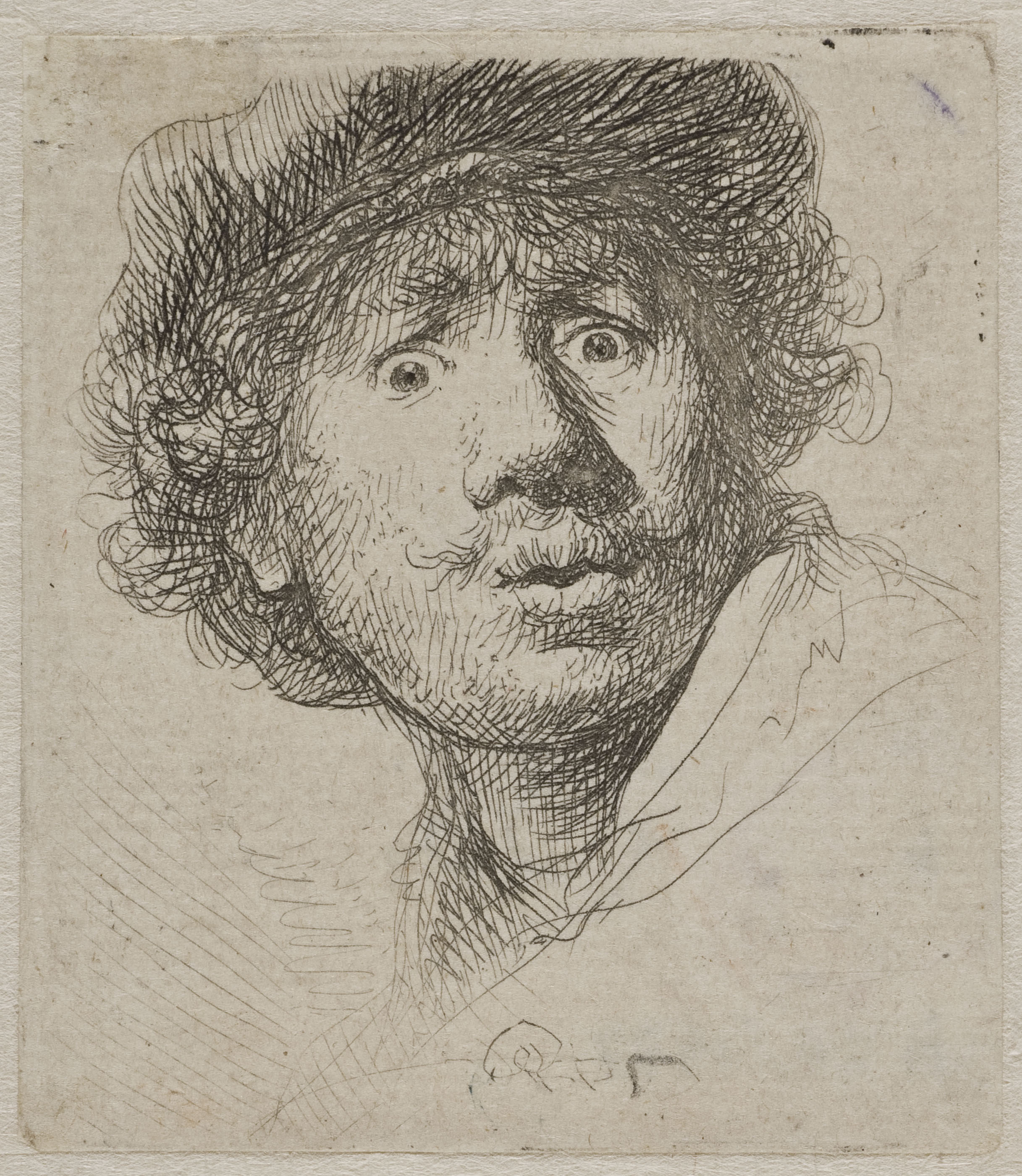
Self-portrait in a cap, with eyes wide open (B. 320), is often used on the covers of publications on Rembrandt's engraved work, such as the one in the Musée du Petit Palais.:

The Dutch Golden Age painter Rembrandt was a prolific printmaker throughout his career, and is universally regarded as one of the greatest creators of old master prints. Though, like other prints, his are often loosely described as "engravings", the main technique he used was etching, with some prints entirely in true engraving or in drypoint. Many prints used a mixture of techniques, as was common at the time.

In all he produced about 300 prints. He is famous for revising prints, sometimes over a period of several years, producing an unusually large number of states, which have provided specialist scholars with a good deal of work. For some of his career Rembrandt had an etching press in his house; this is now recreated in the original room in the Rembrandt House Museum in Amsterdam.

He produced prints on a wide range of subjects: self-portraits and portraits, biblical and mythological subjects, genre scenes, landscapes, and other subjects. In particular, of the unprecedentedly high number of self-portraits by Rembrandt, 31 are etchings, ranging from very quick sketches to four highly finished "official" self-portraits. Unlike his paintings, his prints circulated throughout Europe during his lifetime, contributing to his great reputation.

Some of his prints survive in a single impression (or copy), but these are mostly sketchy studies. Many of his most finished prints have had the plates reworked, initially by Rembrandt himself, to produce a later state, but then by others for two centuries or more after his death. Studies of the paper used, and any watermarks, help to clarify the dating of what are often several stages of creating the print, and then printing off batches of it.

== Overview ==
Trained by Joris van Schooten in Leiden and by Pieter Lastman, Rembrandt quickly incorporated chiaroscuro into his etchings. Initially, Rembrandt produced a large number of reproductive or commercial prints. He began etching around 1625, at the same time as launching his career as an independent painter. Initially very close to the style of Jan Lievens, with whom he shared his studio, Rembrandt left the sculptural effects to work more on faces and the play of light – a characteristic he would develop throughout his career.

Living in Amsterdam since 1630, Rembrandt sought to break into the art market by innovating both in subject and technique, producing compositions captured on the spot of great quality. From 1636 onwards, Rembrandt distinguished himself by his mature treatment of self-portraits, a more humanistic representation of biblical subjects, and his growing mastery of engraving techniques.

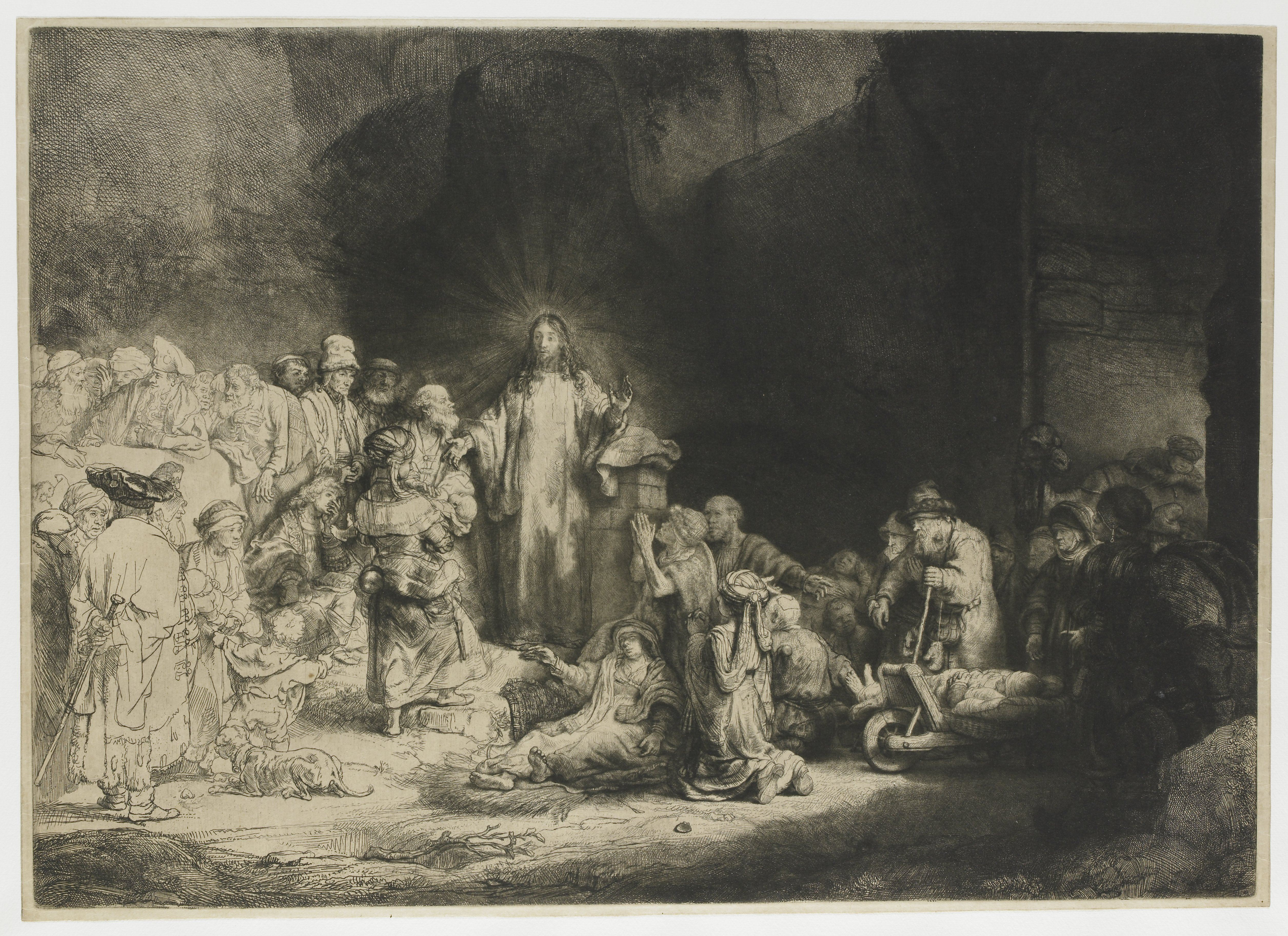
Rembrandt's masterpiece, Christ Preaching (The Hundred Guilder Print) (B. 74), is an etching heightened with drypoint and burin, executed over almost 10 years and completed around 1649. Rijksmuseum Amsterdam.

Rembrandt found his true style in the less productive 1640s, abandoning a sometimes exaggerated Baroque for a more intimate Classicism, in both religious subjects and landscapes. He also gradually changed his approach to subjects, concentrating on the moment whose dramatic tension comes from putting the action on hold. Initially meticulous in the treatment of textures, Rembrandt concentrated on the structure of objects and lighting effects, the apogee in terms of composition and technique being the Hundred Guilder Print (completed in 1649, after a decade of work). In the 1650s, Rembrandt became more productive and artistically liberated.

"But what set this artist apart was a way he invented for making engravings. This one, entirely his own, was never used by others nor seen since and consisted of strokes of points of different strengths, with irregular, isolated strokes, which created a deep chiaroscuro of great intensity. And in truth, in a certain kind of engraving, Rembrandt was much more esteemed by professionals than in painting, in which he seems to have had exceptional luck more than merit of his own."

- Philippe Baldinucci, art historian and contemporary collector of Rembrandt, 1681-1728.

“In the history of graphic art, it rarely happens that a technique can be completely identified with the genius of a single artist; however, it can be said that etching, in the seventeenth century, is Rembrandt.”

- Karel G. Boon, Director of the Prints and Drawings Department, Rijksmuseum Amsterdam, 1963

== Rembrandt and engraving ==
=== The years 1626–1640 ===
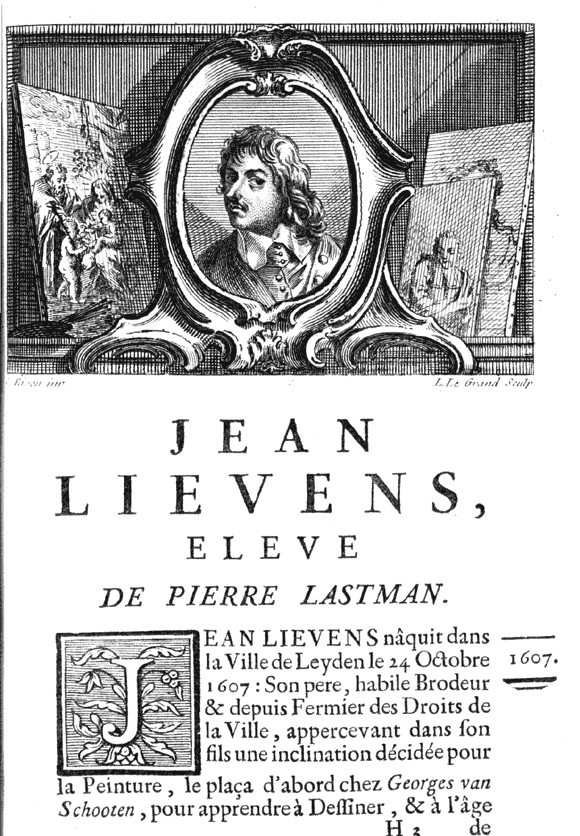
Portrait of Jan Lievens by Charles Eisen, in La Vie des Peintres Flamands, Allemands et Hollandois by Jean-Baptiste Descamps (1754).

==== Training in Leiden and Amsterdam ====
Rembrandt's teachers in Leiden were Jacob van Swanenburgh (Note: Karel G. Boon describes Swanenburgh as a "fairly insignificant painter of architecture, a retarded disciple of Mannerism". While it is known that Rembrandt perfected his pen-and-ink drawing skills with him at the age of 15, "it is not known what influence Jacob Izaaksz Swanenburch had on his young pupil".) (from 1621 to 1623, with whom he learned pen drawing) and Joris van Schooten. (Note: It was at Joris van Schooten's that Rembrandt is said to have met Jan Lievens, then considered “more gifted than he”.)

However, his six-month stay in Amsterdam in 1624, with Pieter Lastman and Jan Pynasc, was decisive in his training: Rembrandt learned pencil drawing, the principles of composition, and working from nature. He mainly tackled the same biblical and antique themes as Lastman, treating them with the same “narrative power and remarkable realistic accents”. Lastman also passed on to him the influence of artists he had met in Rome: Adam Elsheimer and Caravaggio, while he discovered the work of Rubens in his studio. Rembrandt thus appropriated chiaroscuro as his language, “of rare poetry”. The bustle and art of Amsterdam left their mark on his early work; he became acquainted with Flemish painters, including Hercule Seghers.

Rembrandt did not go on the Grand Tour and settled in Leiden in 1625. His friend Jan Lievens, also a pupil of Lastman and van Schooten, joined his studio. By this time, their talent and style were so similar that it was difficult for art historians to distinguish between them. (Note: Even if the writer Constantin Huygens, no specialist on the subject, wrote in 1629-1631 that “Rembrandt was incomparable in the narrative life he knew how to lend to his subjects”.) André-Charles Coppier speaks of a time when Rembrandt's production was limited to an overproduction of commercially oriented prints – “sales subjects” for which he was content with a purely linear style – associated with the painters Jan Lievens, Gerrit Dou, Hendrick Cornelisz. van Vliet and Jacques des Rousseaux.

Personal style and etching debut

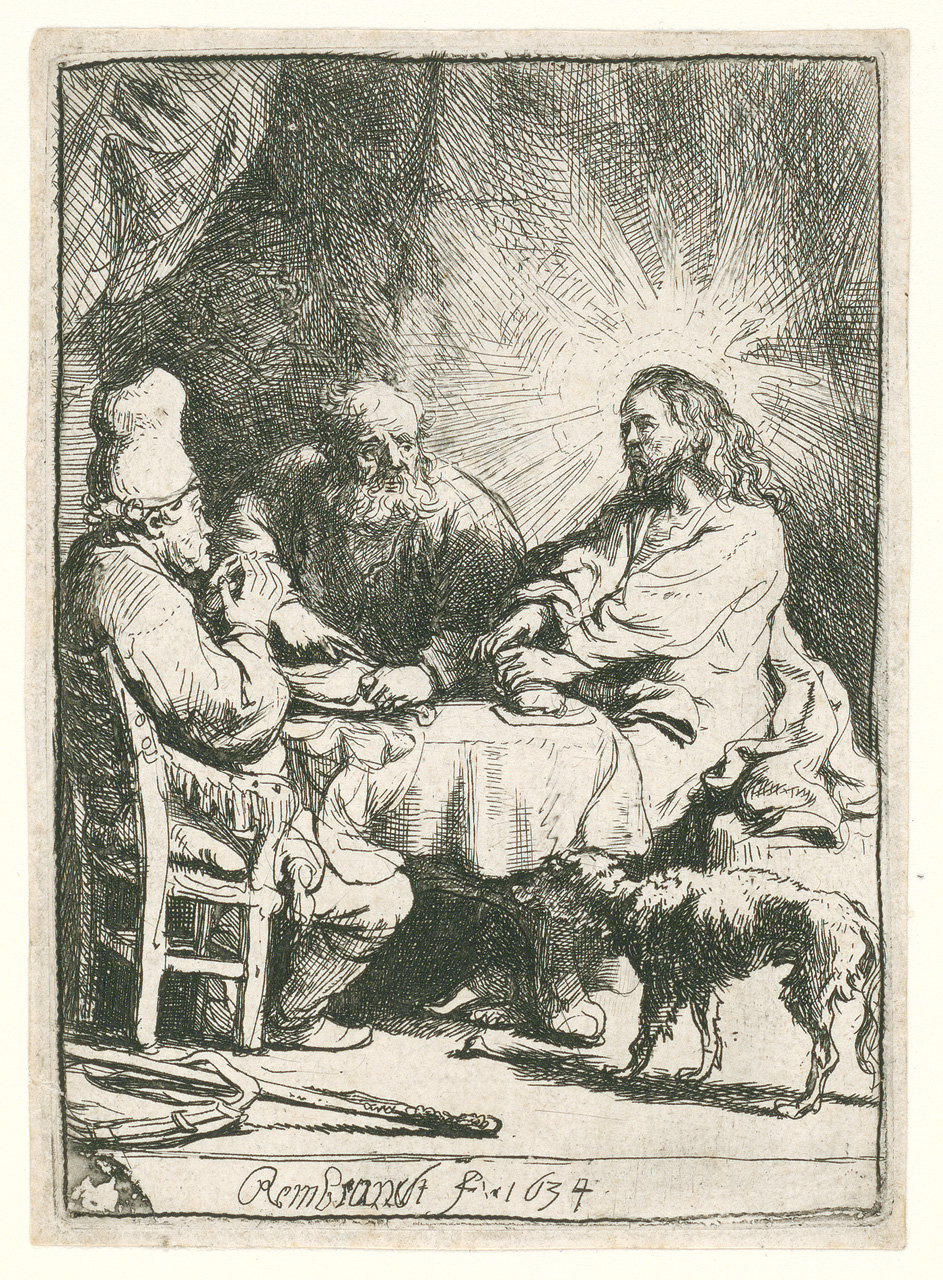
Christ at Emmaus: the Smaller Plate (B. 88).

Rembrandt's works become more intimate and “reveal a new subtlety in the treatment of chiaroscuro” (B. 88, B. 51). He soon found a very free and personal style for self-portraits and visages. (Note: See the small studies of elderly people for whom his parents were most often the models: B. 374 and B. 366.)

He seems to have started etching as early as 1625–26, the beginning of his career as an independent painter, although his first engravings are dated 1628. His technique and style are very close to those of Lievens, who probably instructed him. Rembrandt, however, left sculptural effects to study light effects in particular. He perceived engraving as an experimental and foreign art form: at first, he was content to draw (B. 59, S. 398). His style evolved, as he became more airy and chose larger compositions, although he still produced small, detailed scenes (B. 48, B. 66). We know that Rembrandt owned a collection of Callot's engravings and that he was strongly inspired by the Gueux series (B. 173, B. 16). However, he followed the typical themes of his time in both painting and engraving, with biblical subjects, old men's heads, and self-portraits.

==== Installation in Amsterdam ====
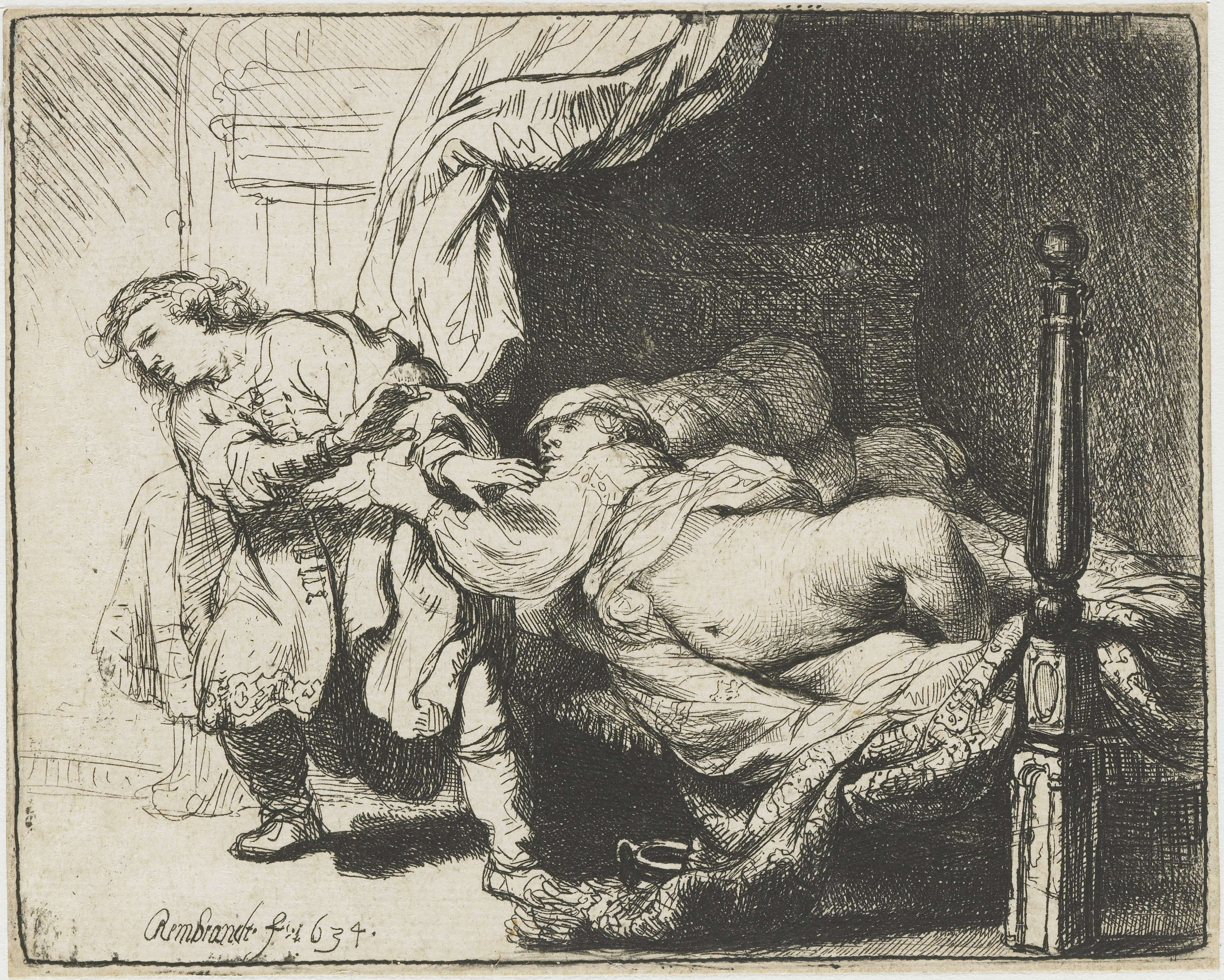
Joseph and Putiphar's wife (B. 39).

Rembrandt moved to Amsterdam in 1631 and opened his studio in the home of his friend, the publisher and art dealer Hendrick van Uylenburgh. He married the latter's niece, Saskia, who had a social network in the local bourgeoisie from which he benefited.

He achieved his first success with the painting The Anatomy Lesson of Doctor Tulp (1632). From 1631 to 1634, Rembrandt painted several self-portraits that were close to the Baroque codes of his painting style at the time (B. 7, B. 23). On the strength of this success, Rembrandt sought to establish himself on the art market, which was dominated by Rubens. He tried to transcribe the imagination he had shown in his paintings in his etchings, where he studied how to reproduce the effects of grisaille painting (B. 73, B. 81, B. 90, B. 77), without success until the Annunciation to the shepherds (B. 44). He did, however, manage to capture reality on the spot with great quality: Grande mariée juive (B. 340) and Faiseuse de koucks (B. 124), which "are two masterpieces in their genres".

He collected numerous works of art – notably by Annibale Carracci and Antonio Tempesta – which never failed to inspire him, as can be seen in Sainte Famille (B. 62) and Joseph et la femme de Putiphar (B. 39).

1636 was a pivotal year for Rembrandt: he achieved greater maturity in his treatment of self-portraits (B. 21), and opted for a humanist – albeit more classical – representation of biblical subjects (B. 91, B. 28), while at the same time displaying a heightened dramatic and baroque expression. Rembrandt also became more aware of the technical means of engraving: he made more precipitate and syncopated cuts in some (B. 91). Still, he was much more tender and nuanced in others, as in his studies of Saskia (B. 365, B. 367, B. 342) or in Jeune couple et la mort (B. 109). He began to exploit Drypoint with an early success, Death of the Virgin (B. 99), but did not use both on the same plate until 1641–1642.

==== The 1640s–1650s ====
In 1639, Rembrandt discovered Raphael's Portrait of Baldassare Castiglione, a revelation that had "a great aesthetic impact" on him.

The union of technique, style and poetry that was to become his style was born in the 1640s. He abandoned the exuberance of the Baroque for a more classical expression; early specialists attributed this shift towards introspection, intimacy, and a return to a more religious content - he intensified the luminous effects - in his biblical scenes to the dramas experienced by the artist at the time (Saskia died in 1642 and he had serious economic problems), while 20th-century writers put this theory into perspective and are more pragmatic. Rembrandt produced few works between 1642 and 1648, and his problems did not flare up again until 1650, a period of great productivity.

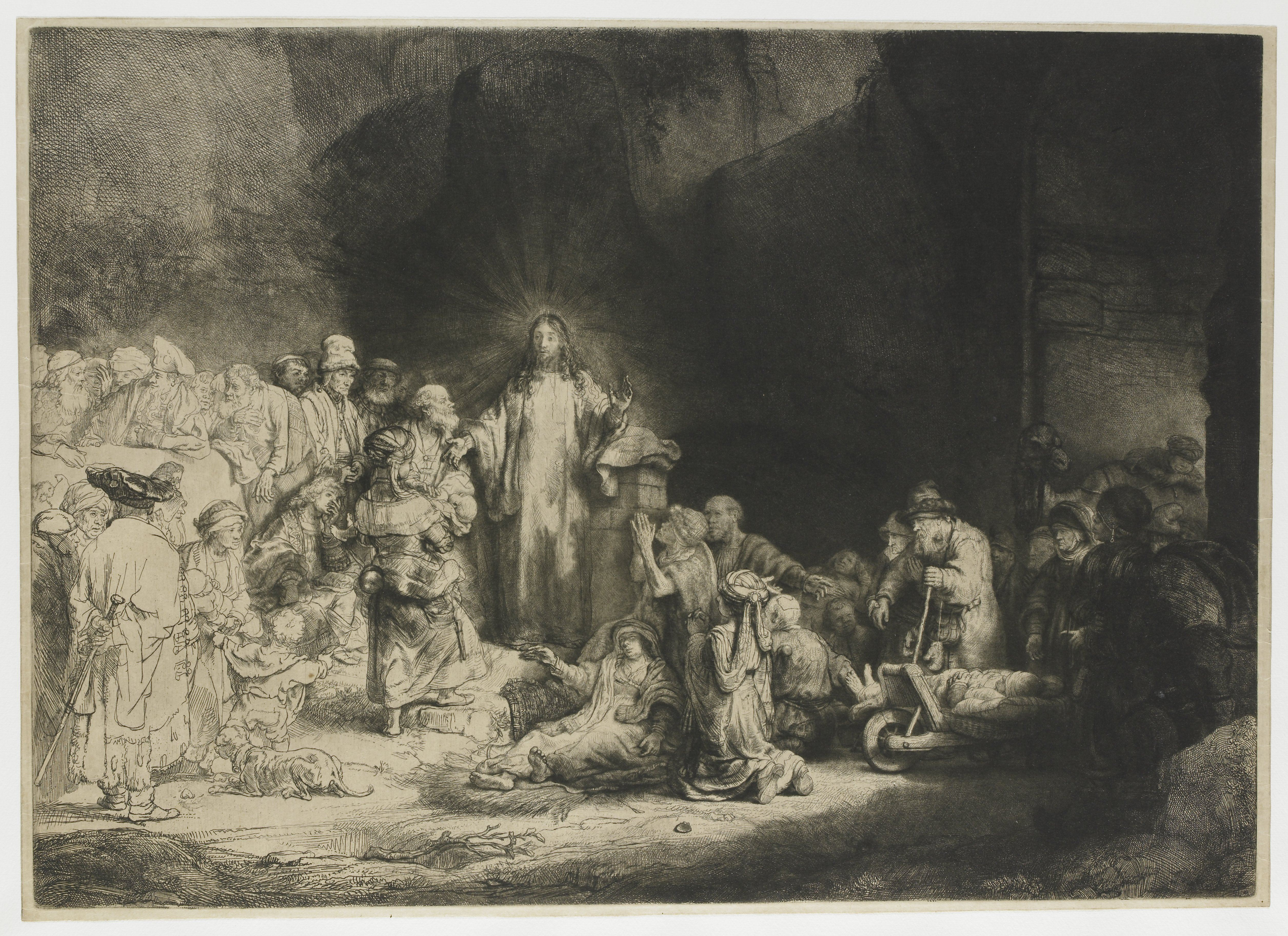
The Hundred Guilders Coin (B. 74).

At the age of 40, he discovered the work of Leonardo da Vinci and Andrea Mantegna, who had a major influence on his future work, notably on The Hundred Guilder Coin (B. 74) and B. 34). Despite his setbacks, Rembrandt evolved through more human experiences and aesthetic concerns in tune with “the general trends of his time”. He thus embarked on a “very thorough and intimate study of landscape”, several years after having tackled the theme in painting. With a “captivating sincerity”, his landscapes benefit from a “suggestive, sparing line” that freshly evokes the details of the vastness of the Dutch landscape (B. 228, B. 208). He progressed in this genre thanks to his ability to see his subjects for himself and to “feel” the atmospheric quality of the landscape. He similarly used softer chiaroscuro and better integration of the subject into its environment, a style that would endure through his future work. He was also interested in “free subjects”, with the pastoral idyll (B. 187) and pure eroticism, with a couple in a very sensual attitude (B. 186), but abandoned commissioned portraiture, except his bourgeois clients (B. 285). His works in this genre benefited from more thoughtful, monumental compositions, abandoning trompe-l'œil effects in his painted and engraved portraits (B. 278).

As in his painting, Rembrandt changed the way he approached his subjects: he no longer depicted the most pathetic moment, but the one "whose dramatic tension comes from putting the action on hold", as in The Little Resurrection of Lazarus (B. 72) and Abraham and Isaac (B. 34). His choice of biblical scenes focused on the most lyrical – see L'ange disparaît devant la famille de Tobie (B. 43) – and he also worked more on nocturnal scenes, as in Le Maître d'école (B. 128), Le repos pendant la fuite en Égypte (B. 57) and Saint Jérôme dans une chambre obscure (B. 105).

His technique as an aquafortist developed “considerably”: he abandoned the meticulous treatment of textures so dear to him – as seen in Le Persan (B. 152) or La Liseuse (B. 345) – to concentrate on the structure of objects and lighting effects, as in Mendiants recevant l'aumône à la porte d'une maison (B. 176). He also made greater use of drypoint; La Pièce aux cent florins (1649) represents "all the aspirations, if not all the achievements of an entire decade", thanks to the harmony achieved by exploiting different techniques.

==== The years 1650–1661 ====
 The Rembrandt collection
This inventory document remained a subject for art historians: his collection included antique and Asian works of art, scientific objects, weapons, musical instruments, costumes, and pictorial works.

He owned paintings by Hercules Seghers, Jan Lievens, Adriaen Brouwer, Pieter Lastman, and Jan Pynas, as well as works attributed to Giorgione, Palma le Vieux, Lelio Orsi, Raphael, and the Carracci; It also housed prints by Andrea Mantegna, Lucas van Leyden, Martin Schongauer, Lucas Cranach the Elder, Hans Holbein the Younger, Maarten van Heemskerck, Frans Floris, Pieter Bruegel the Elder, Peter Paul Rubens, Jacob Jordaens, Hendrik Goltzius and Abraham Bloemaert. Finally, he owned a few books: a Bible, Flavius Josephus' “Antiquités judaïques” illustrated with woodcuts by Tobias Stimmer, and Albrecht Dürer's “Traité des proportions du corps humain” (Treatise on the proportions of the human body).

This inventory has allowed Rembrandt specialists to realize Rembrandt's enlightened curiosity and the great importance of his study of the Italian Renaissance in his work.

Rembrandt's most creative period was also his most personal, liberated, and artistically pure style.

It was also a difficult period for him, both economically and socially (with, for example, his partner Hendrickje, pregnant with his child, being accused of concubinage by the Dutch Reformed Church in 1654, a particularly humiliating episode for Rembrandt). He suffered the effects of a period of economic crisis for Holland, the consequences of British protectionist shipping acts. He was unable to pay off his house in full, debts on the purchase of collector's items, and his paintings earned him less than before. So, in 1656, he formalized his bankruptcy and petitioned the High Court (Hoge Raad van Holland, Zeeland en West-Friesland) for an inventory of his assets (see box) to repay his creditors. In 1658, his partner Hendrickje and Titus set up a partnership to continue the art trade they had begun before these events, and obtained exclusive rights to Rembrandt's works in return for the obligation to maintain them for the rest of his life. (Note: This association provided material support for Rembrandt but protected the trade in his works since he no longer had the legal right to do so.)

Last years

In 1663, Hendrickje died and Titus married, leaving Rembrandt completely alone. These events left their mark on Rembrandt's contemporaries, and Joost van den Vondel, the great national poet, like them, drew a parallel with his works, which were considered more obscure than before, describing him as “the friend and son of the shadow, like the nocturnal owl”.

Critics of his time, such as Joachim von Sandrart (Teutsche Academie, 1675), Samuel van Hoogstraten (Inleyding tot de Hooge Schoole der Schilderkonst, 1677), Arnold Houbraken (Le Grand Théâtre des peintres néerlandais, 1718-1721) and Gérard de Lairesse (Le Grand Livre des peintres, ou l'Art de la peinture considéré dans toutes ses parties, et démontré par principes ... auquel on a joint les Principes du dessin, 1787) praised his genius, but criticized “his lack of taste, his vulgar naturalism, his careless drawing, and the scarcity of noble subjects in his work”. Rembrandt followed the evolution of the international Baroque towards a more classical phase, but as his personal style reached its zenith, he moved away from that of his contemporaries, closer to Van Dyck, or even his pupils or former workshop companions (Govaert Flinck and Jan Lievens).

Despite his image as a misunderstood loner, Rembrandt continued to receive commissions: from private individuals, notably Jan Six (B. 285); from guilds, as evidenced by the famous painting Syndics of the Drapers' Guild (1662); and even internationally, since an Italian nobleman commissioned a philosopher and received Aristotle Contemplating the Bust of Homer (1653) and later Alexander the Great (1661) and Homer (1663), as well as 189 etchings in 1669. He also continued to have pupils, notably Philips Koninck and Aert de Gelder.

During his last eight years, Rembrandt produced just one etching: a portrait (B. 264) commissioned as “insignificant”. According to Sophie de Brussière (Petit Palais), Rembrandt's withdrawal from this art form was not due to any impediment linked to old age, but to the fact that he had already completed his exploration of etching techniques - and at the same time achieved what he had been striving for throughout his career as a painter, “light-color” - and was no longer paying attention to it.

== Historiography of Rembrandt's etchings ==
=== Reference historians ===
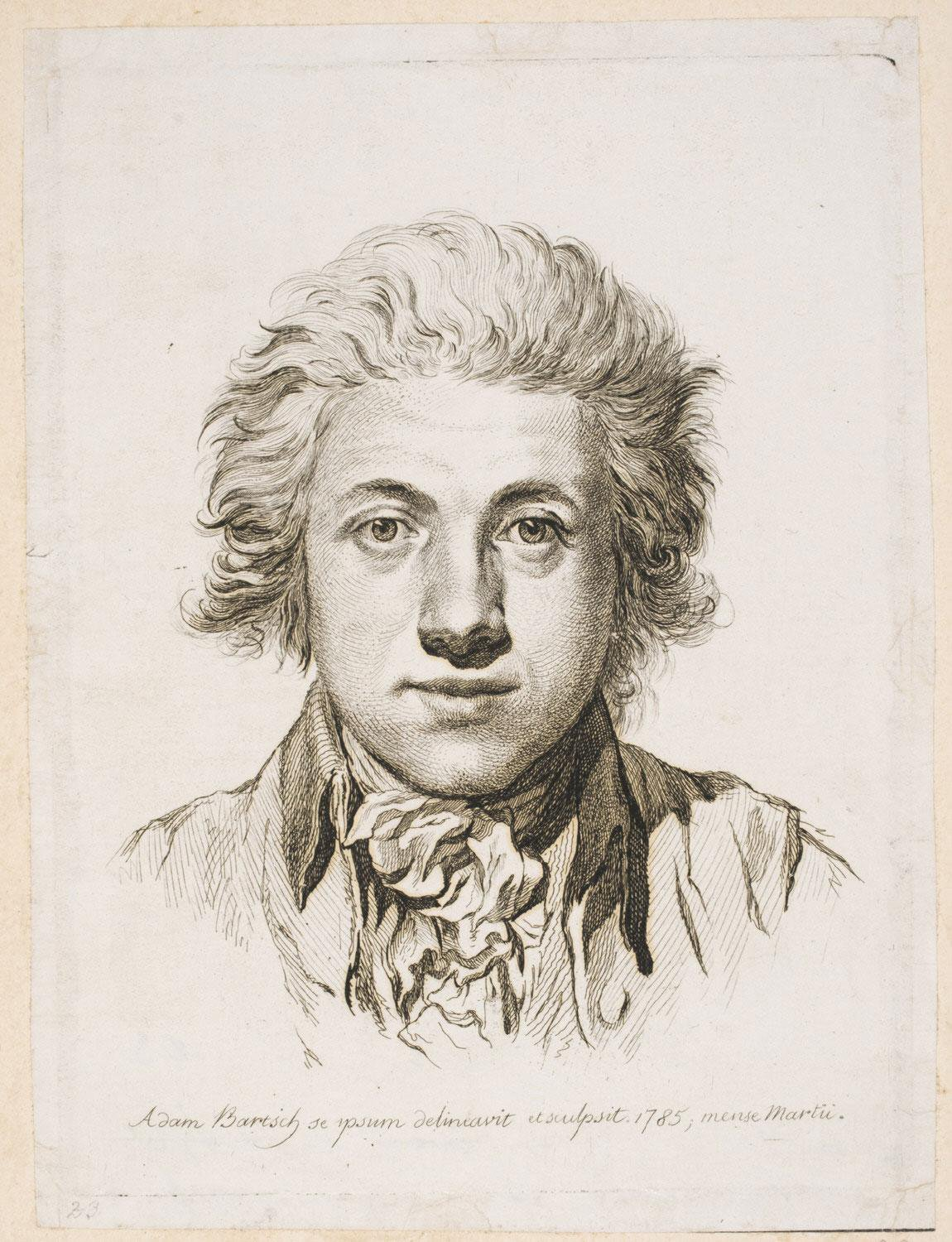
Self-portrait of Adam von Bartsch in etching (1785).

Edme-François Gersaint (1694–1750) was the first to publish a catalog of Rembrandt's engravings, in 1751 (posthumously): le Catalogue raisonné de toutes les pièces qui forment l'œuvre de Rembrandt. (Note: This first Rembrandt catalog raisonné is also the very first catalog of the graphic work of a single artist, with a detailed chapter on doubtful attributions and the connoisseur's question of how to distinguish Rembrandt's work from that of his pupils.) In this work, Gersaint chose to classify the works not in chronological order, but according to the subject - and in this, he was to be followed by most of his successors - which are: Rembrandt portraits; Old Testament; New Testament; pious subjects, fantasy pieces; beggars, free subjects; landscapes; portraits of men; fantasy heads; portraits of women; studies.Adam von Bartsch (1757-1821), also an aquafortist, wrote a landmark work in this field: Catalogue raisonné de toutes les Estampes qui forment l'Œuvre de Rembrandt, et ceux de ses principaux Imitateurs. In it, he established what became the definitive numbering system, based on his name (e.g. “Bartsch 17” or “B. 17”), for Rembrandt etchings and copies by many other artists, a system still in use today.

Ignace Joseph de Claussin (1795–1844), an aquafortist and print dealer, fell in love with Rembrandt when he tried to compile a catalog raisonné of all his prints, including his own engravings after the Dutch master, whose quality misled some specialists. In 1824, he finally published Catalogue raisonné de toutes les estampes qui forment l'œuvre de Rembrandt, et des principales pièces de ses élèves, followed in 1828 by Supplément au Catalogue de Rembrandt, the first of which became a reference work, notably for Charles Henry Middleton, who quoted extensively from it in A Descriptive catalog of the etched work of Rembrandt van Rhyn (1878), another landmark work.

Shortly before the latter, Charles Blanc (1859–1861) had undertaken an ambitious work, L'Œuvre complet de Rembrandt, catalog raisonné de toutes les eaux-fortes du maître et de ses peintures (in two volumes), in 1859-1861. However, André-Charles Coppier (see below), strongly criticized this work: he claimed that Blanc himself had copied forgeries abroad and had them etched by Léopold Flameng to illustrate his third catalog with so-called facsimiles.

In 1986, the Petit Palais based its two-volume monograph Rembrandt: Eaux-fortes on Eugène Dutuit's Œuvre gravé de Rembrandt (1883), “recognized for the technical perfection of their illustration. This “serious work” is based on the study of his own collection and those of the French National Library and the British Museum. He broadly follows the categories of his predecessors to study 363 pieces (80 of which are now rejected). Dutuit had a great aesthetic sensitivity, as revealed by the large number of high-quality prints (fine supports, parchment, Japanese or Oriental paper) and very well preserved. He donated the 375 pieces to the Musée du Petit Palais in 1902; Rembrandt: Eaux-fortes presents 175 etchings from this collection.

Arthur Mayger Hind is a British specialist in etching, particularly Italian, but has published several works on Rembrandt's etchings: A Catalogue of Rembrandt's Etchings: chronologically arranged and completely illustrated (1900), Etchings of Rembrandt (1907), Rembrandt, With a Complete List of His Etchings (?) and Rembrandt and his etchings. A compact record of the artist's life, his work, and his time (1921).

André-Charles Coppier's Les eaux-fortes authentiques de Rembrandt, published in 1929, is also cited by the Petit Palais, which explains that although it is incomplete, it “provides an element of stylistic judgment that is crucial to the difficult evaluation of Rembrandt's production during the Leyden period: the author defines the engraver's handwriting, the point of which twirls ‘in sawtooth scratches, tendrils, and singular zebra marks’. Now, this tracery of great graphic freedom, which has never been well imitated by anyone, characterizes all the artist's etchings, from the earliest to the latest, and is an essential aid in rejecting forgeries."

=== Catalogue numbers ===
Specialists categorize Rembrandt's etchings according to whether all the states are Rembrandt's; whether they were reworked and finished by a foreign hand; whether they are known only from a state reworked by a pupil; and those rejected. If we exclude this last category – in which are mainly prints made in the early 1630s, when he was starting at his workshop – Hind counts 29335; Gersaint, 341; Bartsch, 375 and Middleton and Dutuit, 329. André-Charles Coppier excludes 140 pieces from Bartsch's list, rejecting “doubtful pieces, forgeries and erroneous attributions” (Note: See also List of Rembrandt engravings for details.) - a third of the pieces catalogued by Bartsch in 1797 and by Charles Blanc in 1873 -; he also rejects the prints that Woldemar von Seidlitz added to his 1895 catalogue.

Catalogs raisonnés of Rembrandt's engraved works frequently present a table of correspondence between the different notations in each of the reference catalogs raisonnés

- "G.": Gersaint, catalog published in 1751;
- "Da.": Daulby (1796);
- "B.": Bartsch (1797);
- "Cl.": Claussin (1824 and 1828);
- "W.": Wilson (1836);
- "Bl.": Blanc (1859 or 1873);
- "M.": Middleton (1878);
- "Dut." or “Du.": Dutuit (1880 or 1881-1885);
- "R.": Rovinski (1890);
- "S.": Seidlitz (1895) (Note: Note that while Woldemar von Seidlitz (1895) uses the Bartsch notation, he uses the “S.” notation for prints that Bartsch did not include in his catalog raisonné and that Seidlitz attributes to Rembrandt.)

The notation chosen for this article is the Bartsch notation, the reference most commonly – and sometimes only – used. (Note: André-Charles Coppier's “Catalogue chronologique des eaux-fortes authentiques et de leurs états de la main de Rembrandt” uses only the Bartsch notation.) When a work has not been known or recognized by Bartsch, the second notation used is that of Seidlitz (1895). This notation is very often included in the correspondence tables for Rembrandt's print notations35. A correspondence table between the notations of Edme-François Gersaint (Gersaint-Yver-Daulby), Adam von Bartsch and Ignace Joseph de Claussin, sorted by subject, is produced and can be consulted in Thomas Wilson's A Descriptive Catalogue of the Prints of Rembrandt (1836), starting on page 242; another, even more extensive, was made by Hind in A Catalogue of Rembrandt's Etchings: chronologically arranged and completely illustrated, starting on page 133.

Collectors' interest in Rembrandt's prints

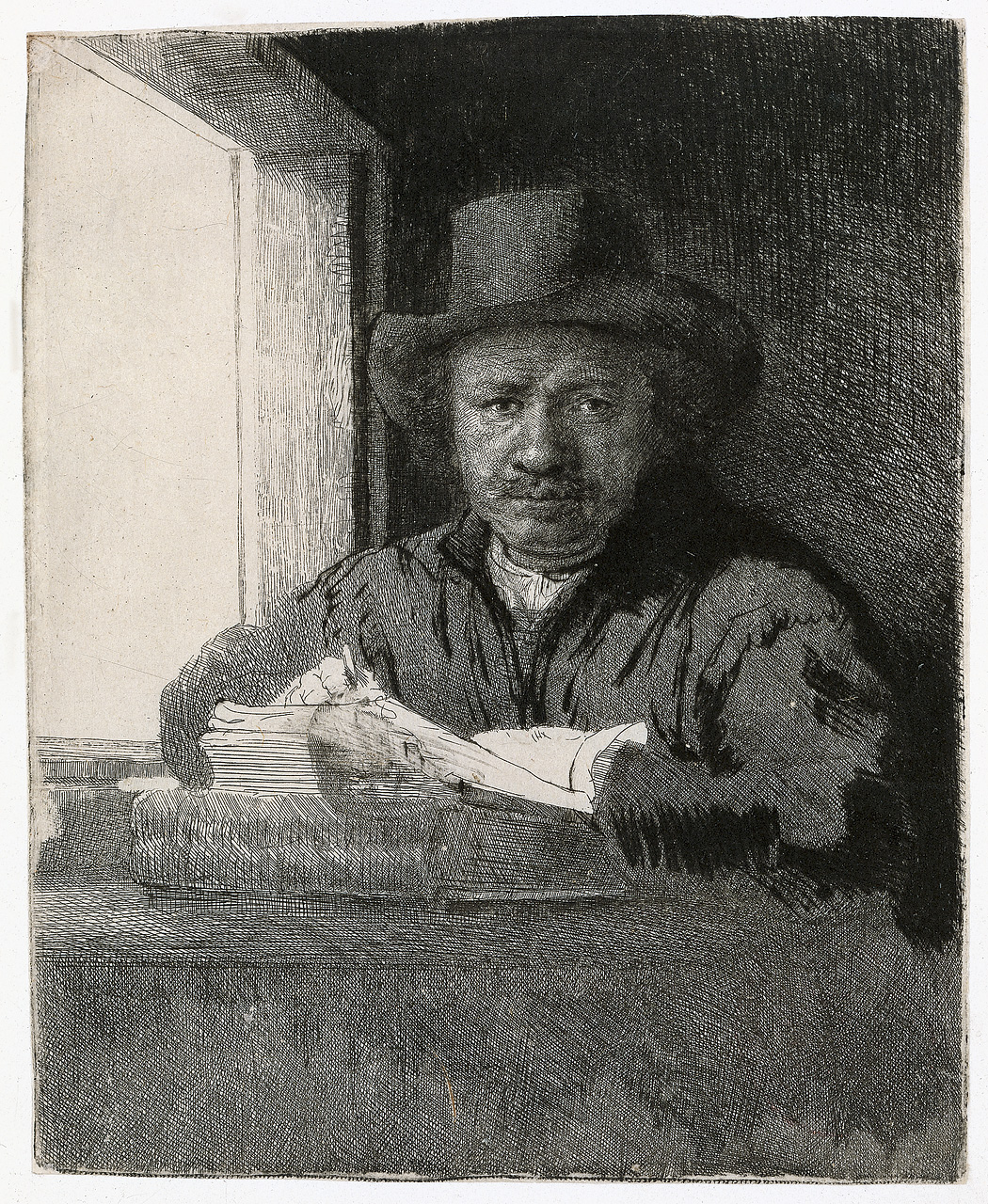
Rembrandt drawing at the window or Rembrandt engraving (1648) Rijksmuseum Amsterdam (B. 22).

By producing numerous states of his prints, while maintaining an exclusive attitude, Rembrandt knew how to arouse collectors' interest in him and his work, as Arnold Houbraken reports in De Groote Schouburgh der Nederlantsche konstschilders en schilderessen (in French, “Le Grand Théâtre des peintres néerlandais”, 1718-1721): “You had to court him [Rembrandt] to obtain certain pieces of his work. It was almost ridiculous not to have a print of little Juno crowned and uncrowned, of little Joseph with a white face, and of the same with a black face." Among the prints acquired by Dutuit, many bore the marks of the most prestigious collections, such as John Barnard.

A friend of Rembrandt – the latter produced an engraved portrait of him (B. 272), one of his finest pieces – and a major player in the art market of the time, Clement De Jonghe accumulated a large number of copperplates, including 74 etchings by Rembrandt, which were sold two years after he died in Amsterdam in 1679.

Collectors did not hesitate to exhibit them publicly, as Eugène Dutuit did, lending some of his most important Rembrandt prints to prestigious exhibitions attended by numerous collectors, such as those of the Burlington Club - notably the Self-Portrait Engraving (B. 22) in 1877 – the Cercle de la Librairie prints exhibition and the Central Union exhibition – including the masterpiece The Hundred Guilder Print (B. 74) in 1882. Since Dutuit donated his prints to the Musée du Petit Palais, there have been few exhibitions of Rembrandt's engravings, and these were presented in small numbers. Among the most notable was the “Exhibition of Prints by Rembrandt and Dürer” in 1933, another at the Louvre in 1969 to mark the tercentenary of Rembrandt's death and finally the one at the Petit Palais, Paris in 1986.

The fame of Rembrandt's etchings has endured through centuries, partly because he was the first to truly exploit it with such technical and artistic mastery, even though the technique had been around since the 15th century and had not changed very significantly since the 16th century.

== Technical considerations ==
=== Rembrandt's technique ===
Almost all of Rembrandt's prints are executed in etching, his process for which is detailed below. However, he also used other techniques such as drypoint and engraving proper (with a burin) for retouching. (Note: See list of Rembrandt engravings.)

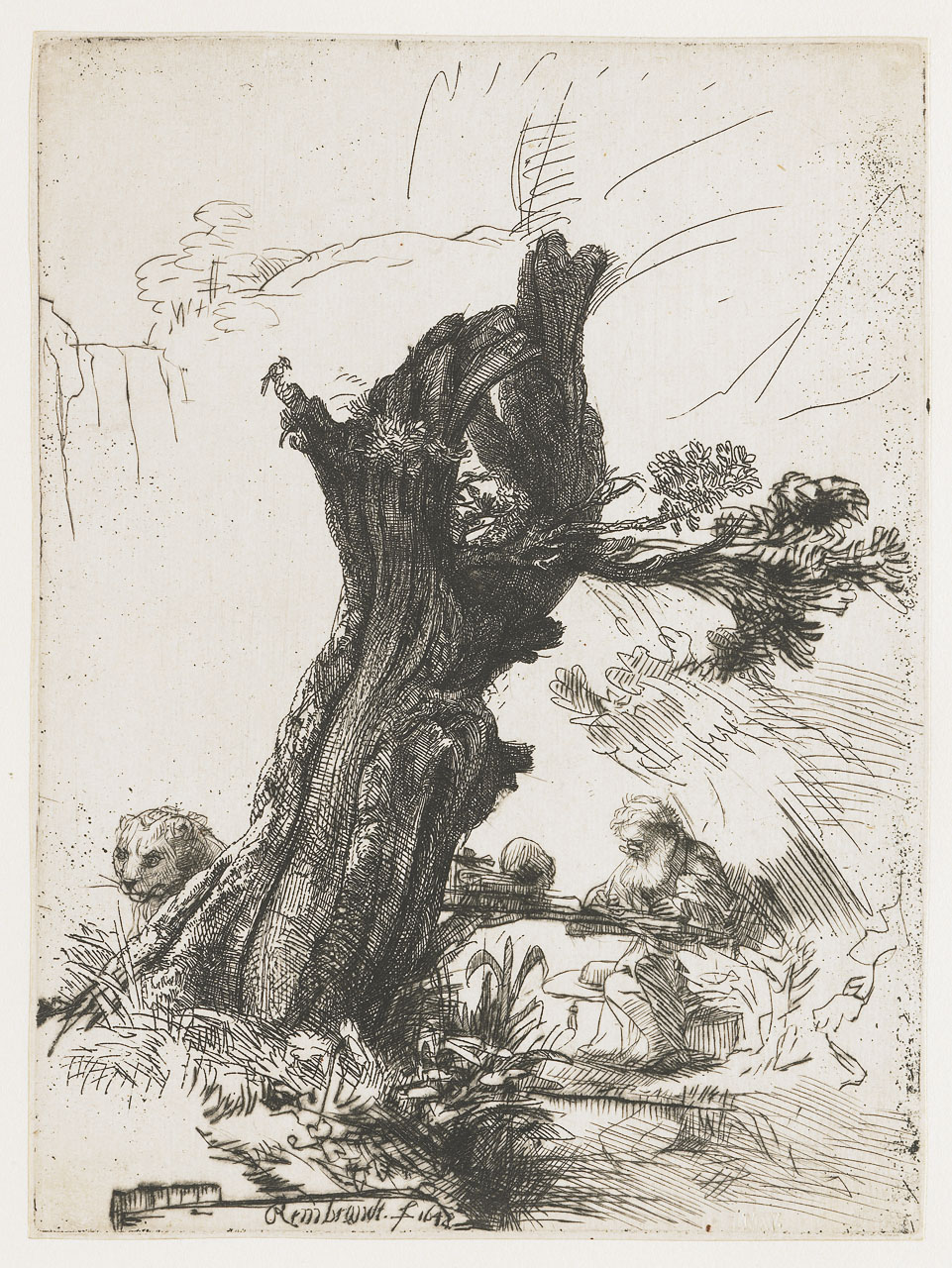
Saint Jerome writing under a tree (B. 103).

The chemical technique of etching was developed in the Middle Ages by Arab armorers to decorate their weapons. It flourished in the southern part of present-day Germany in the 15th century, where the first etchings were printed towards the end of that century. In the early 17th century, Dutch artists such as Esaias van de Velde, Jan van de Velde the Younger and Willem Buytewech experimented with the technique. They sought a better tone and a way to create an atmospheric effect in their landscape prints, breaking away from long contour lines to draw them with small strokes and dots. Hercules Seghers in turn experimented with etching, but for different reasons: he tried to reproduce a painterly effect by printing on colored paper or canvas; moreover, he reworked the print after printing with a brush coated with colored paint, making each print unique.

Rembrandt quickly became very interested in these developments and pushed the technique to the limit. In his hands, etching became an art form in its own right, occupying him for the rest of his life. He produced some 300 etchings, all of them intended to be original works of art. (Note: As opposed to reproduction engraving, the main function of the medium at this time.) His mastery of drypoint and the unique deep black of his etchings became famous during his lifetime, and his etchings were particularly sought after by collectors of his time.

An etching can be enhanced using a drypoint and burin, by engraving directly onto the plate - whereas in the etching process, the varnish is removed without touching the plate - (Note: See the complete etching process in the dedicated article.) but the line can be coarse and the effect lost after the press has passed. (Note: See the specific features of the dry point in the dedicated article.) Rembrandt never enhanced his etchings at first; but from 1640 onwards, he became more interested in these techniques, particularly the velvet effect produced by drypoint: Saint Jerome writing under a tree (B. 103) is an example. He also engraved a number of prints exclusively in drypoint (B. 76, B. 222, B. 221).

When the artist corrects the plate after printing, we speak of a new "state". Virtually all of Rembrandt's prints exist in several states – from minor corrections to genuine new compositions.

Variations can also be introduced by inking differently: the artist can choose to leave more or less ink on the plate before it goes under the press. This technique is used in The Three Crosses (B. 78), where Rembrandt seeks to accentuate contrasts and achieves a very dark effect by leaving a lot of ink in certain areas of the plate. He also employed the “surface tone” (Note: "Surface toning" consists of not cleaning the entire plate, to give a grayish effect by the presence of a little ink scattered over the whole plate or a particular area.) technique to give greater depth to the shadows, as in Woman with an Arrow (B. 202), or to create an atmospheric effect in his landscapes, as in Landscape with a Square Tower (B. 218). It is also noteworthy that Rembrandt made his impressions – unlike the vast majority of artists – precisely to have the freedom to ink according to the desired effect.

Finally, Rembrandt also used reverse-proofing (Note: A counterproof is a print made in reverse by taking a freshly printed, still-moist proof, laying a sheet on top, and passing the two together under the press. The result is a print of a print - the counterproof - which naturally, by being printed in reverse twice, corresponds exactly to the original composition of the plate. This is useful for correcting small errors or making slight adjustments.) technique to make minor corrections, particularly for The Three Crosses.

Philosopher with an Hourglass (B. 318) has long been considered Rembrandt's only known woodcut. it is not known whether the original drawing is by Rembrandt or Lievens, but all the specialists credited it to Rembrandt; Charles Blanc justified this by saying that “it is worthy of him by the delicacy of the expression and by the learned and precise indication of the philosopher's hand” and that his friend was more his imitator than his pupil. However, it is now definitively attributed to Lievens by the Hollstein.

Drawing technique

Rembrandt would never have used tracing paper or reference points before tracing his drawing directly onto the varnish. He would have used pencils for very few engravings (B. 201, B. 271, B. 272).

We know that Rembrandt was right-handed, thanks to the hatching he made in his numerous drawings.

=== Soft varnish ===
In etching, the varnish serves to protect the plate from the bite of the acid that seeps in where the engraver has removed the varnish with his point. The composition of this varnish has evolved, impacting the aesthetics of the etching. Rembrandt chose a soft varnish, which allows greater flexibility and freedom for the hand, as opposed to the hard varnish borrowed from the violin makers of Florence and Venice and used by Jacques Callot.: Its composition has been known since 1660 and the publication of the treatise The Whole Art of Drawing, Painting, Limning and Etching

- virgin wax: 60 g;
- Judean bitumen: 60 g;
- resin: 30 g;
- teardrop putty: 60 g;
- Burgundy pitch: 30 g;
- turpentine: 15 g.

However, according to André Béguin's Dictionnaire technique de l'estampe, which cites Abraham Bosse (De la manière de graver à l'eau forte et au burin, 1645, revised by Charles-Nicolas Cochin in 1745), this composition is that of the formula for a varnish taken from a manuscript by Callot. He proposes another formula, called “Vernis de Rimbrandt [sic]”, whose composition is as follows:

- virgin wax: 30 g;
- tear mastic: 15 g;
- asphalt or amber: 25 g.

Traditionally, the copper was then varnished with a hot stamp, before being smoked with a torch.

=== The acid ===
Once the varnish has been applied and the drawing made on it, the plate is dipped in acid so that it bites where the varnish has been removed.

Rembrandt used “Dutch mordant”, which "digs deeper to produce clean, precise lines, unlike nitric acid, which produces broad, rather coarse lines". It consists of:

- Water: 1 L;
- hydrochloric acid: 125 mL;
- potassium chlorate: 25 g;
- salt: 25 g.

=== Inking ===
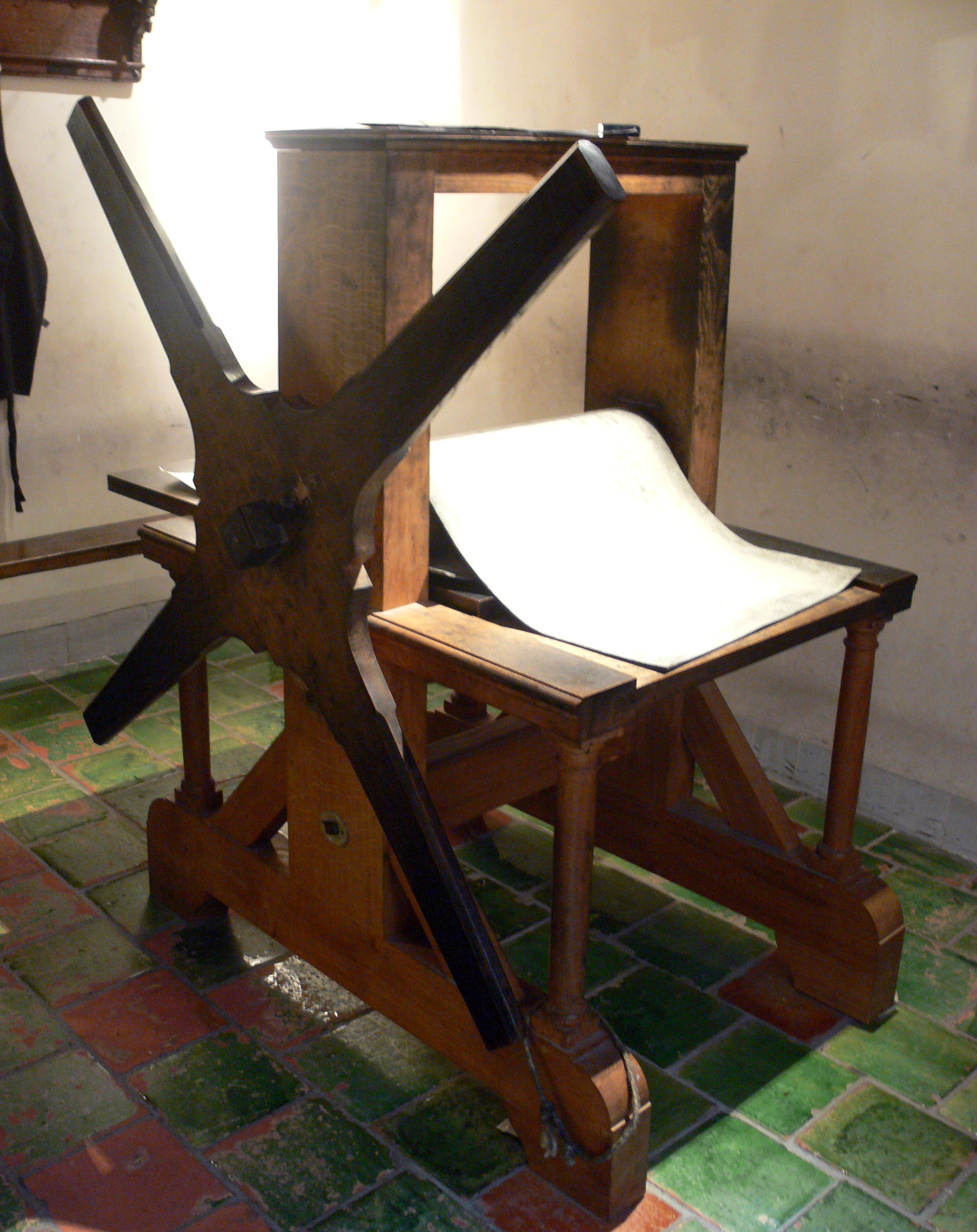
Reconstructed intaglio press in Rembrandt's studio (Rembrandt House Museum).

Rembrandt made his inks (Note: Careful wiping of the copper, often leaving ink only in the sizes, lends a “charm” of “great graphic purity” to his prints.) and prints, on two intaglio presses – one made of “island wood”, (Note: The expression “island wood” is not a clearly defined term, but it seems to refer to woods intended for cabinet-making: mahogany, ebony, rosewood, gayac, etc.) the other of oak – that he had at home, (Note: Unlike other artists, who had people – usually students – in their studios to do this. Reproductions of these presses are on permanent display at the Rembrandt House Museum.) which enabled him to study the evolution of his plates all the more precisely. To achieve more pictorial effects, Rembrandt did not wipe his plates completely: he sometimes left a light veil of ink on certain smooth areas to obtain a form of “tint”. (Note: When this “tinting” technique is used only in certain areas of the composition, we speak of “rolled-up proofs”, as in the case of Saint Jerome reading in an Italian landscape (B. 104).)

=== Support ===
Several types of paper (European, Japanese, Chinese, etc.) and vellum paper can be used: they vary in color and grain (type of surface). The artist can thus choose the one best suited to the desired effect.

Rembrandt always sought to exploit the different possibilities that each support could offer. For example, he initially used only paper made in France (Troyes and Angoulême), as Dutch mills did not produce paper suitable for printmaking until the end of the seventeenth century. The distinctive feature of this Frenchz paper is the integration of a “watermark” into the trellis: a brass mark that leaves a clearer trace, as the paper becomes thinner. This information makes it easier to identify an antique print, but the different watermarks they produce according to the needs of their Dutch customers also vary in motif (B. 81, B. 71, B. 77, B. 340, B. 281, B. 280), although two watermarks are exclusive to Dutch customers: the Tête de fou with five or seven boules (B. 116, B. 266, B. 21, B. 103, B. 272, B. 65, B. 67, B. 78, B. 86) and the Armes d'Amsterdam. Towards the end of the 1640s, in his quest for a certain richness of tone, Rembrandt varied the quality of his supports, even to the point of using paper of very inferior quality, such as cardoes paper (for the Dutch; oatmeal paper for the English), a “rather coarse, buff-colored” paper.

He sourced paper from Asia, frequently using japon, (Note: It was easily imported into the Netherlands thanks to the trade relations between the two countries from 1639 to 1854, via the Dutch East India Company based in Java.) a paper with no vergeures, pontuseaux or watermarks, available in a variety of weights and textures, and colors ranging from opaline white to golden, almost tan. Rembrandt appreciated its warm, yellowish color, which was very effective for his landscapes or outdoor scenes (B. 70, B. 104); the very fine, soft surface of this paper enabled him to exploit the full effect of drypoint.

He also used a paper that is erroneously called “Chinese”: a very fine, sometimes lined, gray pearl-colored paper (e.g.: B. 86, 1st state). Finally, Rembrandt used a pale yellow paper similar in appearance to Indian miniatures (presumably from that country).

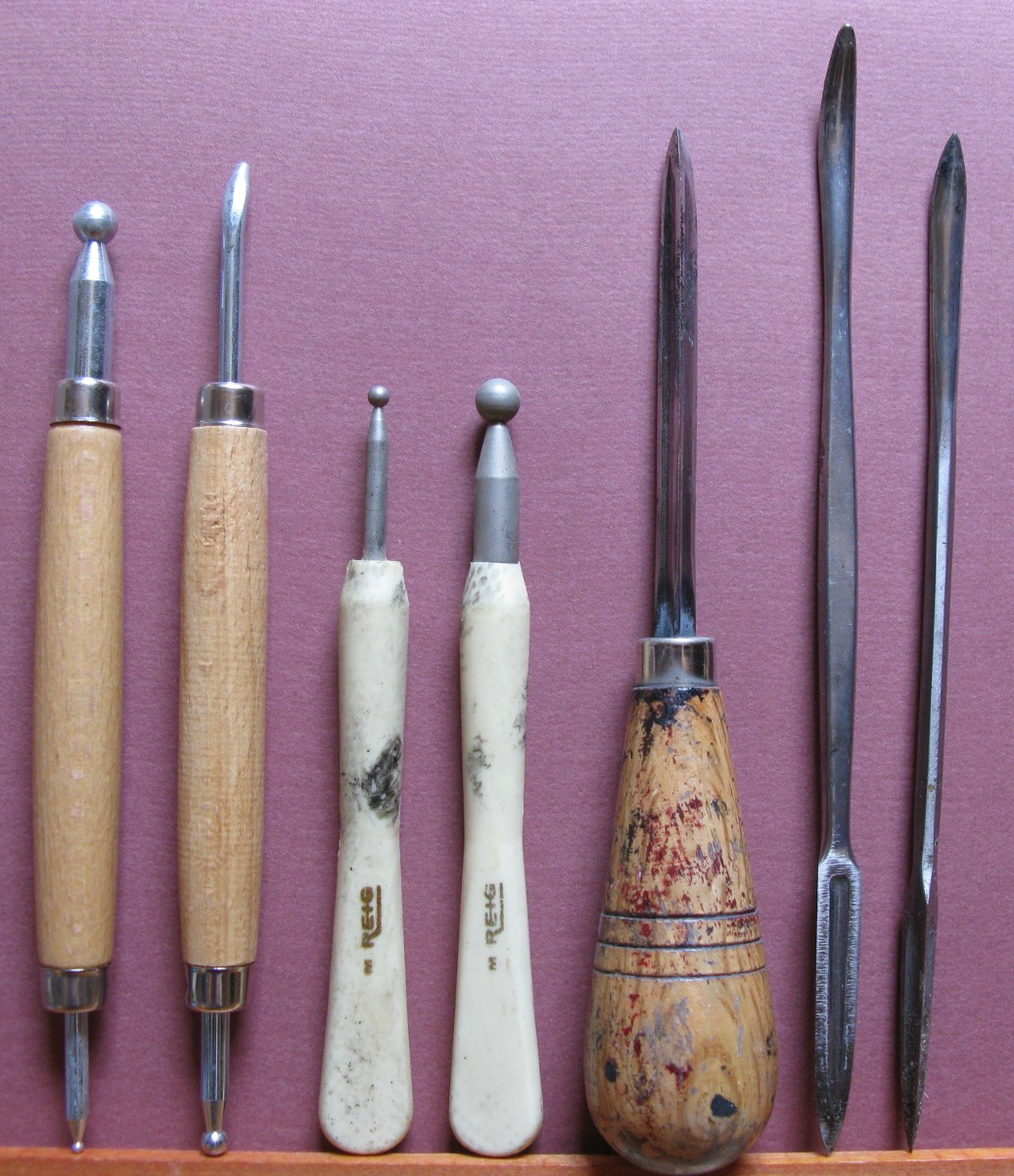
Various burnishers.

Retouching

A print plate can be retouched in a variety of ways, to correct defects or achieve a desired effect; for example, the artist can use a scraper or burnisher, or play with the support by changing the inking or paper type. At each stage, he may make a print to see the intermediate or potentially definitive result: each of these proofs thus corresponds to a state of the print. Observing the succession of these states allows us to follow the progress of the work, and thus to imagine Rembrandt's progress in the elaboration of his print: we can see corrections, premeditated or unpremeditated evolutions, or the search for variation.

== Selected prints ==
Rembrandt's engravings are “traditionally” sorted thematically in catalog raisonnés, according to their subjects.

=== Self-portraits ===
- Rembrandt aux yeux hagards (1630, etching and burin)
- Rembrandt with a round hat and embroidered coat (1631, etching and drypoint and pen and brown ink drawing)
- Rembrandt with scarf around his neck (1634, etching)
- Rembrandt and Saskia (1636, etching)
- Rembrandt drawing at the window or Rembrandt engraving (1648, etching and drypoint)

=== Portraits and heads ===
- Jan Uytenbogaert, known as “The Gold Weigher” (1639, etching and drypoint on silk)
- Portrait of Jan Six (1647, etching, drypoint, and burin)
- Doctor Fautrieus, falsely called Faust (ca. 1652, etching, drypoint, and burin)
Self-portraits and portraits

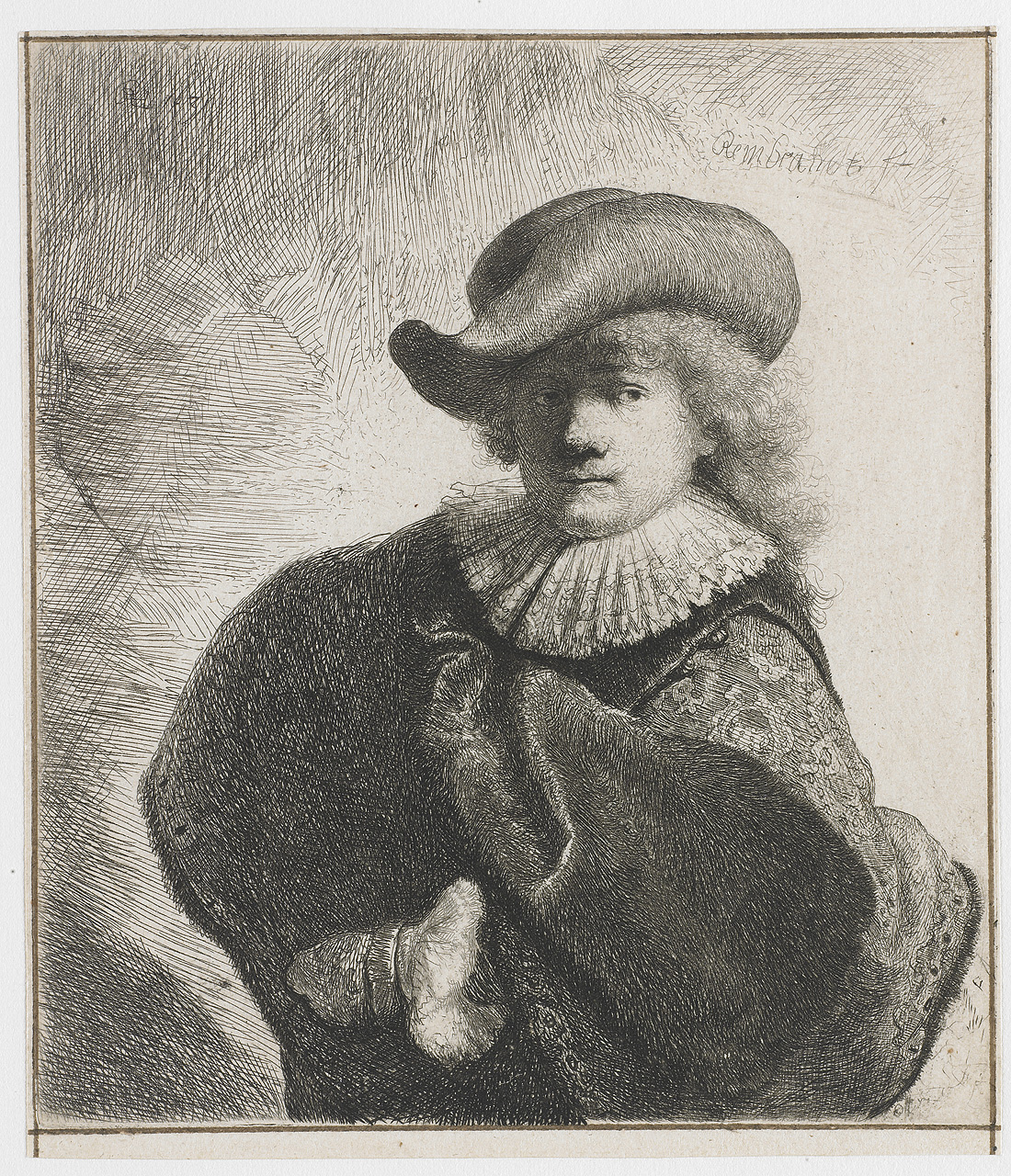
Rembrandt with round hat and embroidered coat. (1631, Rijksmuseum Amsterdam).

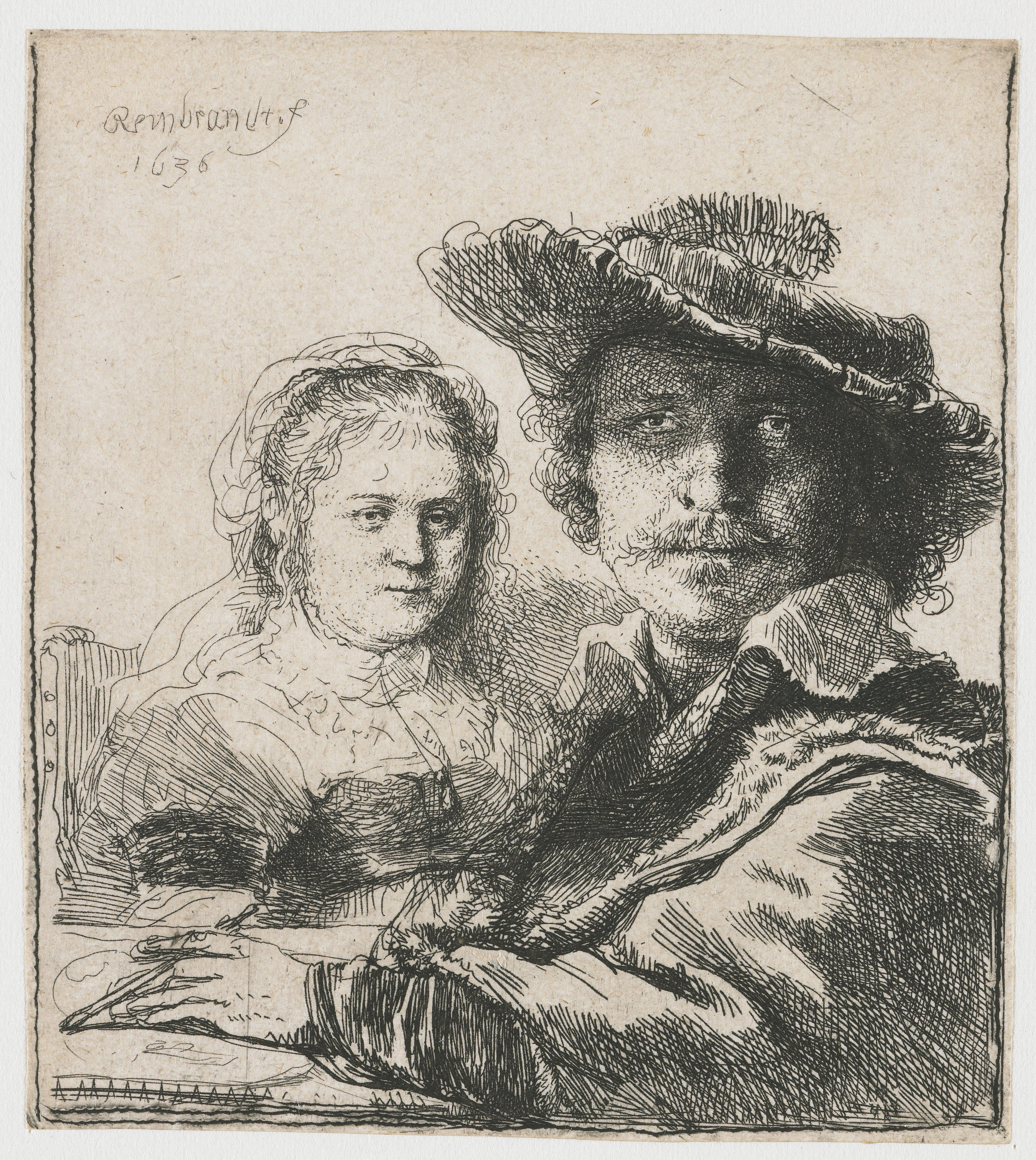
Rembrandt and Saskia (1636, Rijksmuseum Amsterdam).

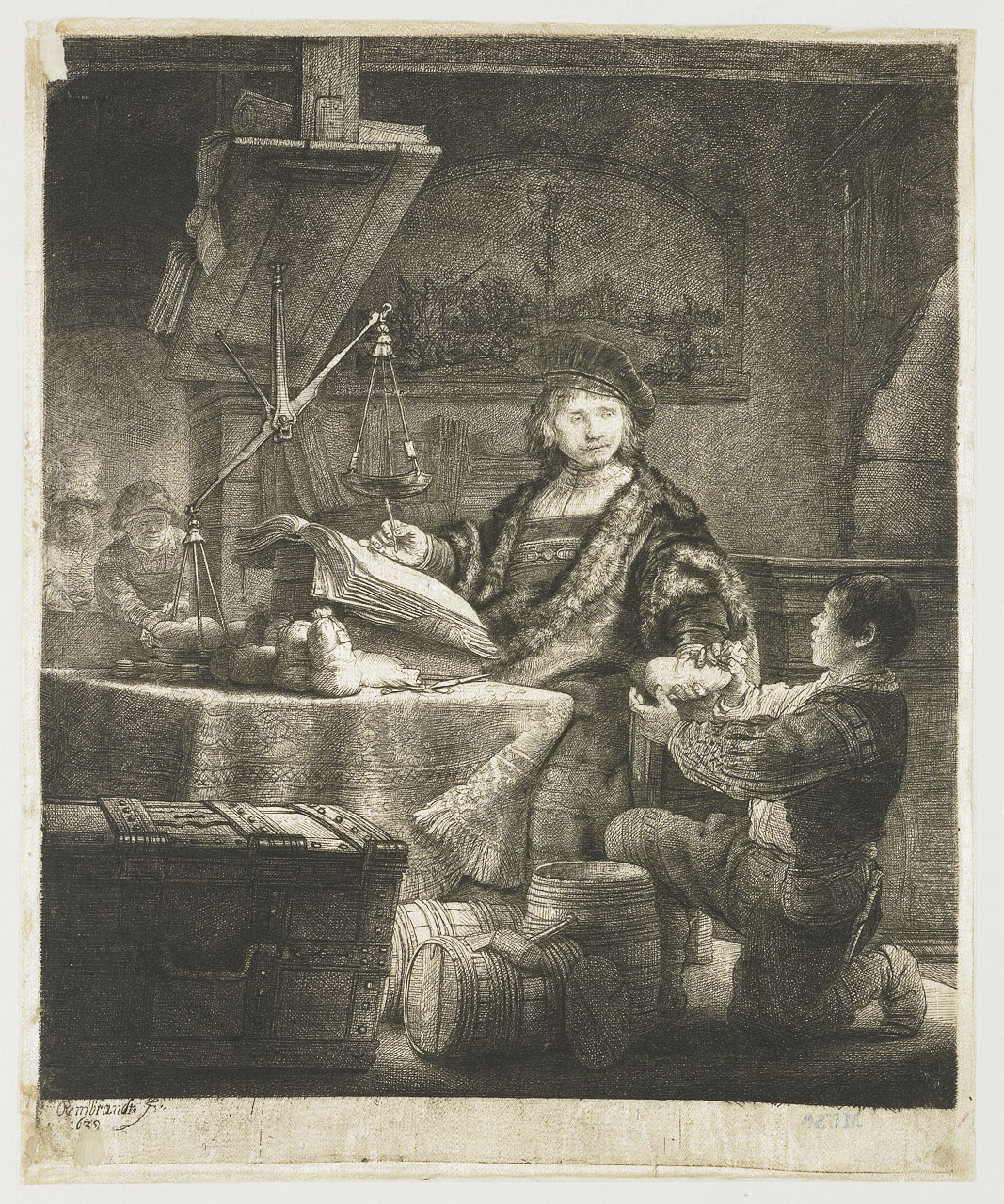
Jan Uytenbogaert, this “Le Peseur d'Or”

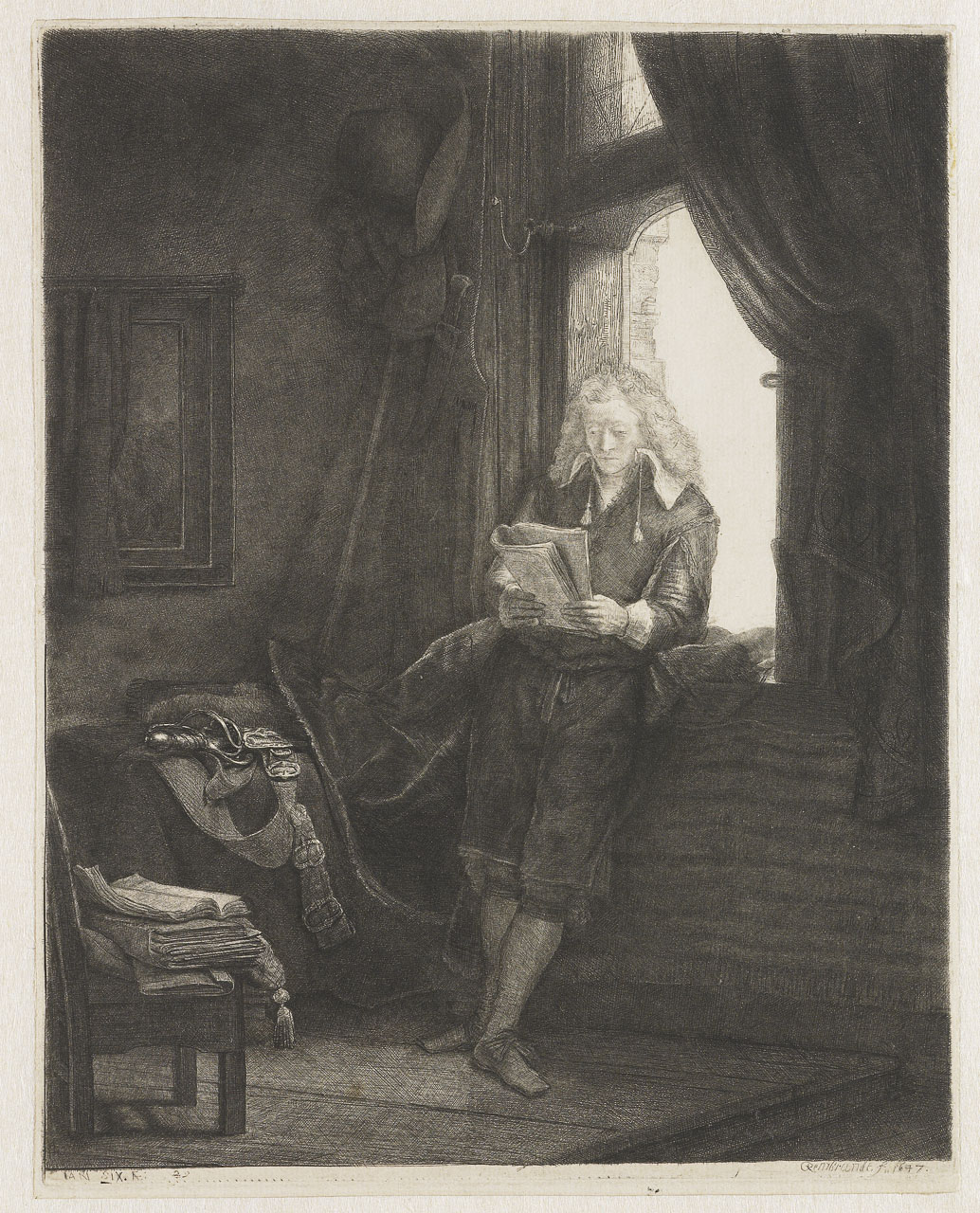
Portrait de Jan Six (1647, Rijksmuseum Amsterdam).

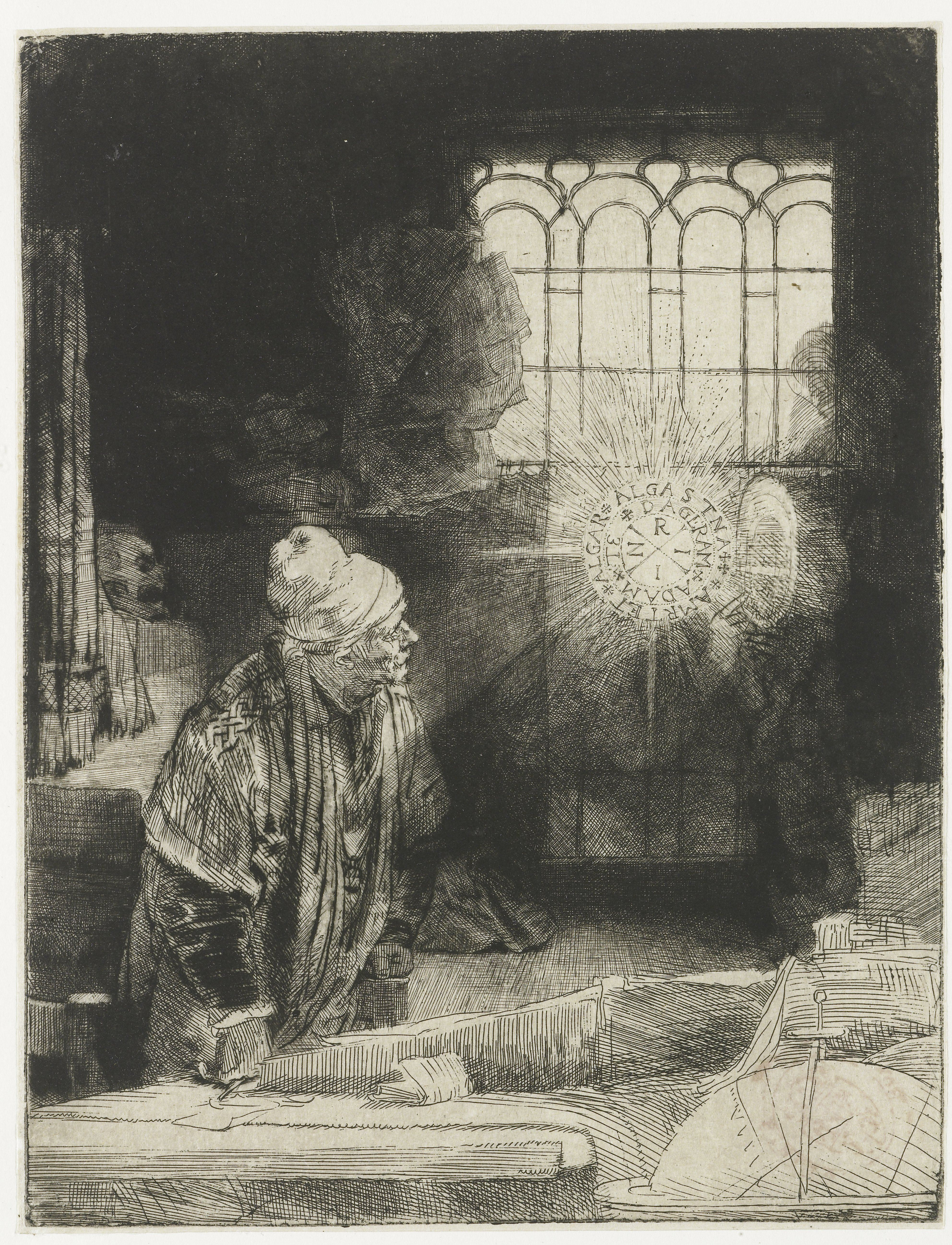
Le Docteur Fautrieus. (1652, Rijksmuseum Amsterdam).

=== Biblical and religious subjects ===
- La grande Descente de croix (1633, etching and burin)
- Joseph and Putiphar's Wife (1634, etching)
- La Pièce aux cent florins (ca. 1649, etching, drypoint, and burin)
- Jesus Christ Preaching, or “The Little Tomb” (ca. 1652, etching, drypoint and burin)
- The Three Crosses (1653-ca. 1661, drypoint and burin)
- Jesus Presented to the People, or Ecce Homo en largeur (1655, drypoint on Japanese paper)

=== Allegorical or mythological subjects ===
- Jupiter and Antiope: the large plate (1659, etching, drypoint, and burin)
Religious or mythological subjects

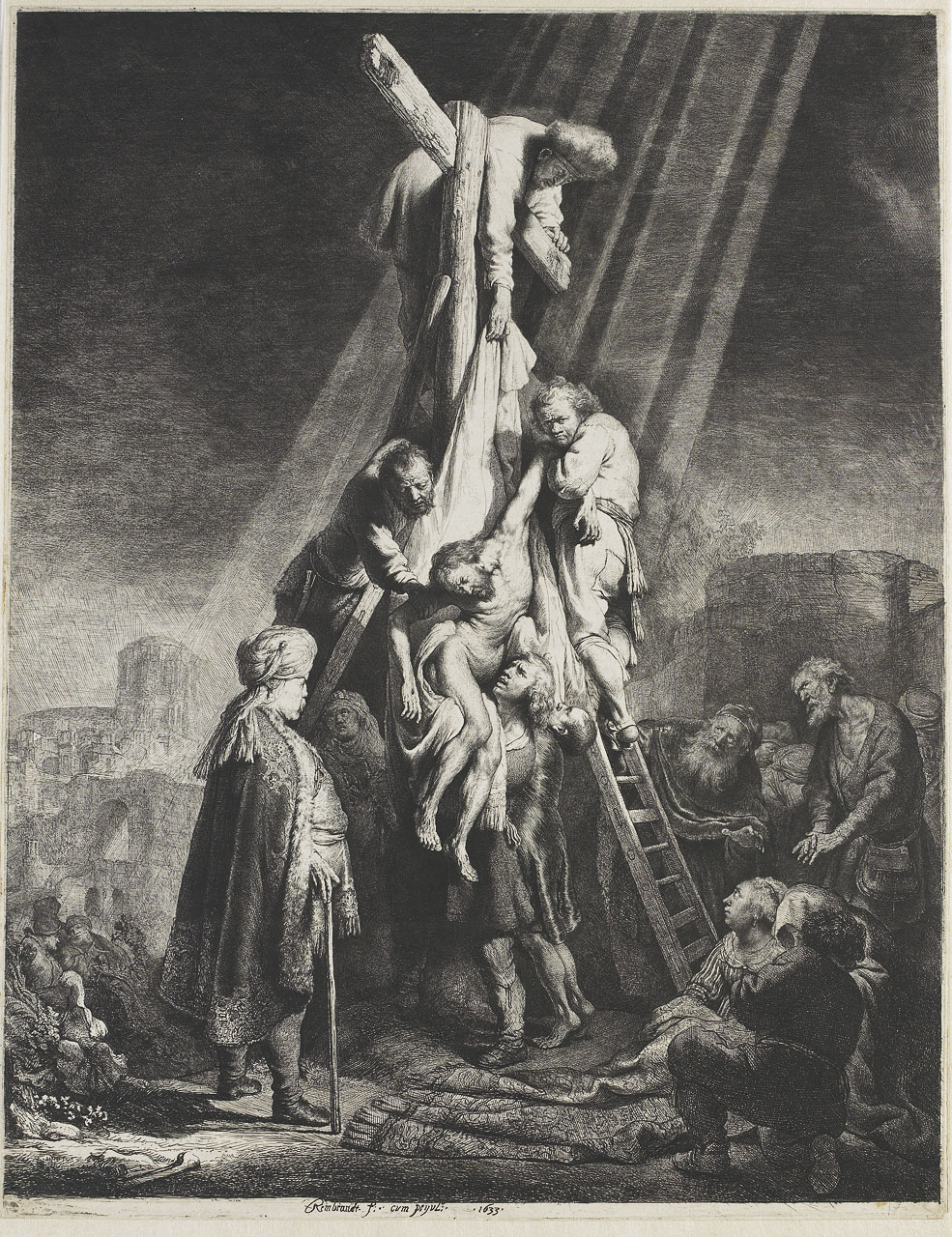
La grande Descente de croix (1633, Rijksmuseum Amsterdam).

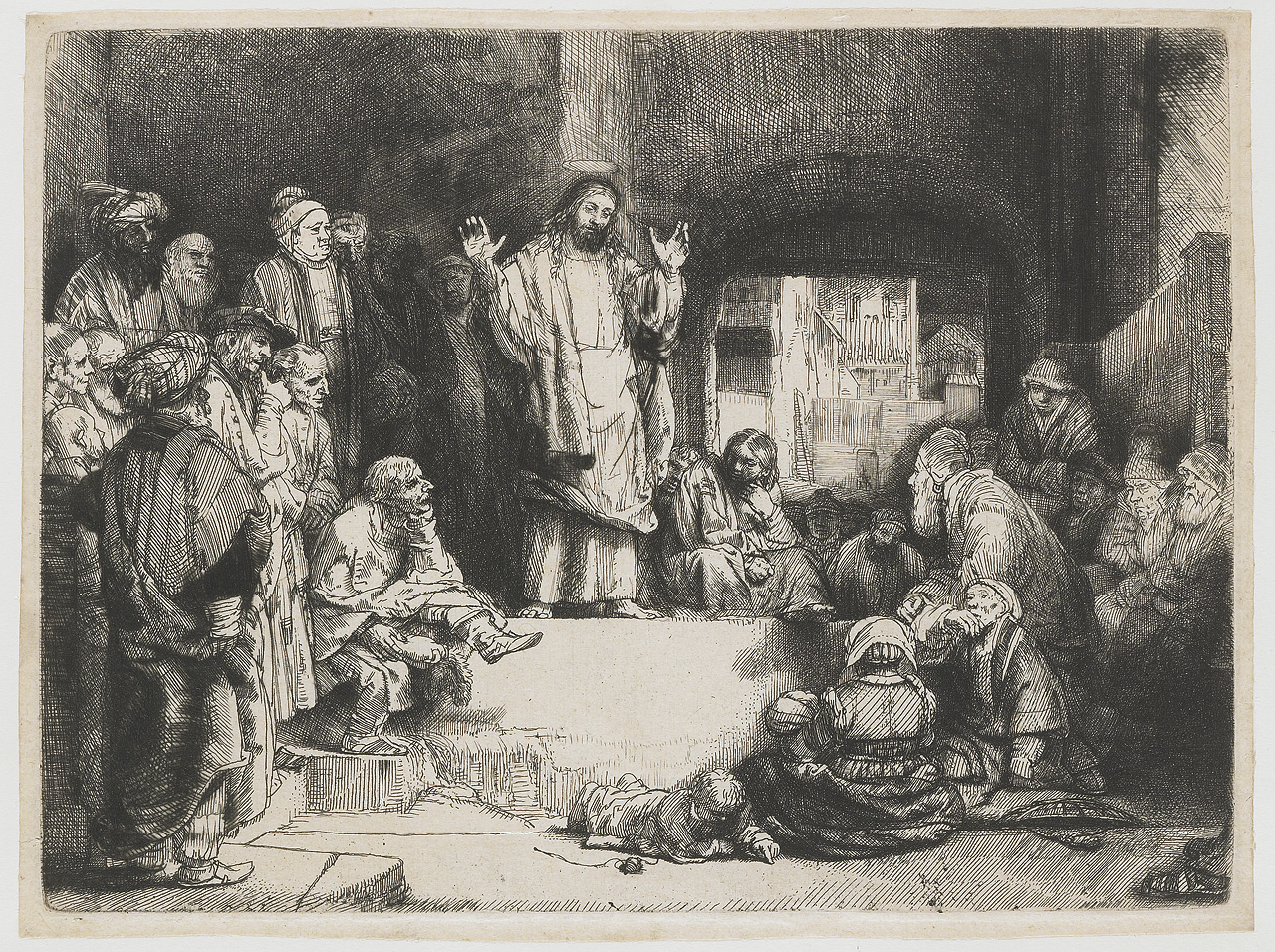
Jesus Christ preaching (ca. 1652, Rijksmuseum Amsterdam).

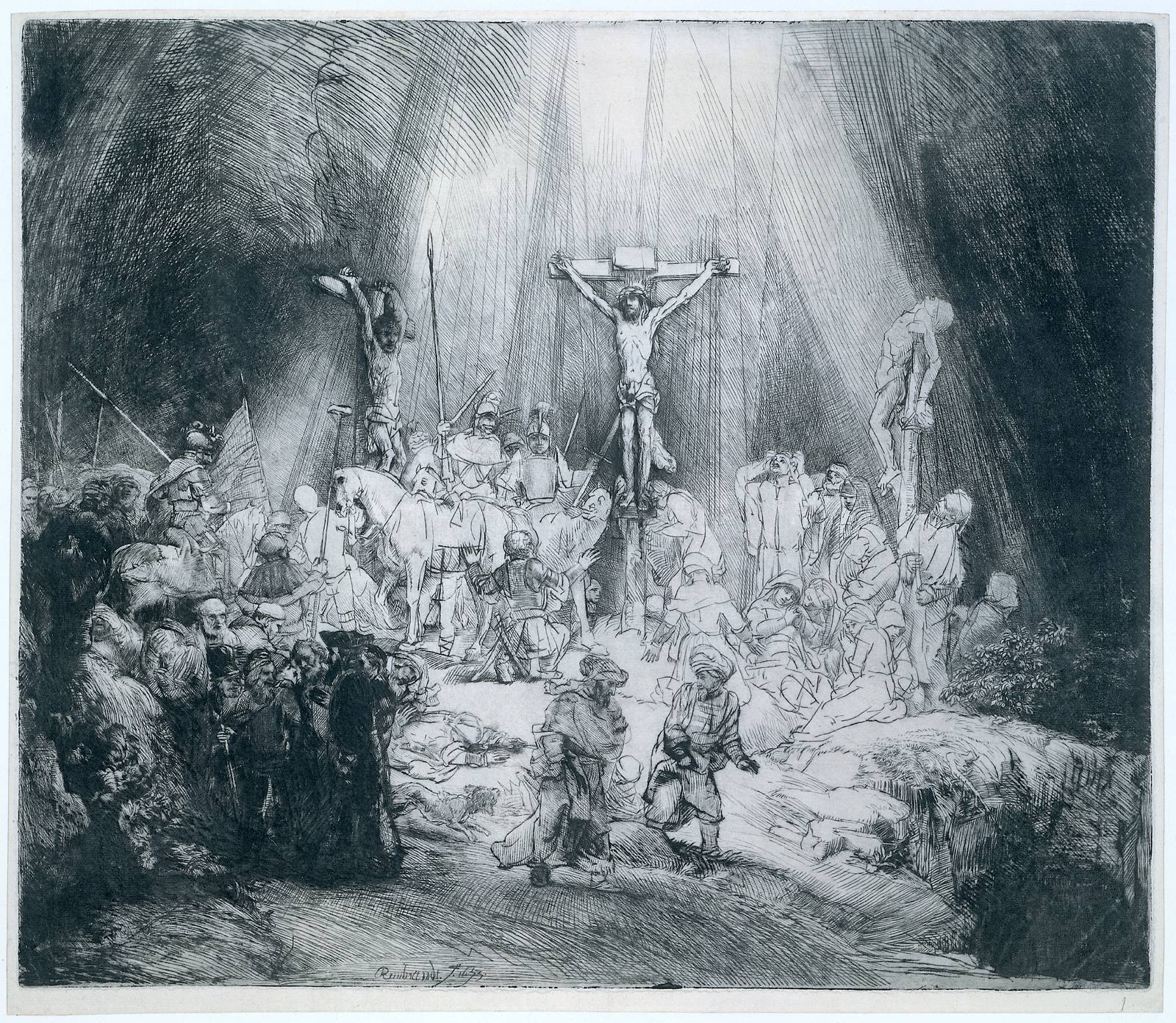
Les Trois Croix (1653-ca. 1661, Rijksmuseum Amsterdam).

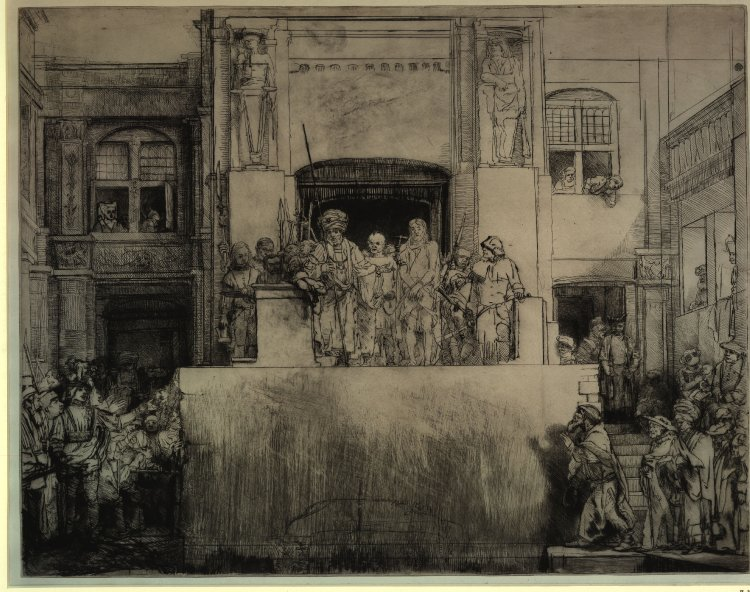
Jesus presented to the people, or the Ecce Homo in width (1655, Rijksmuseum Amsterdam).

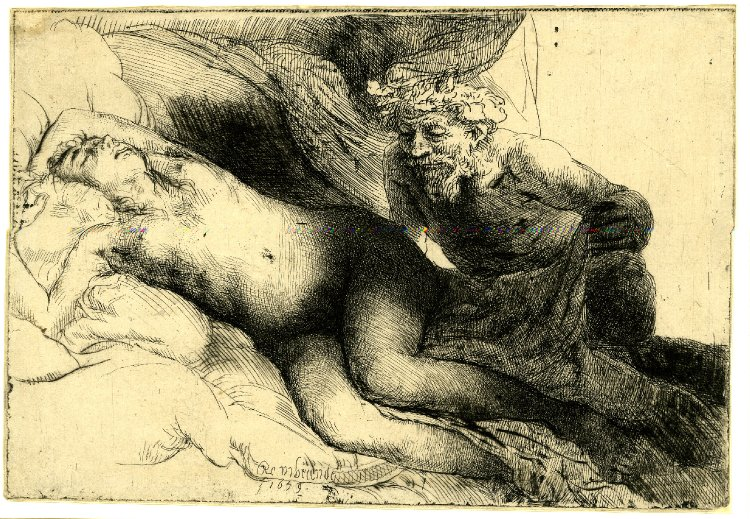
Jupiter and Antiope: the large plate (1659, British Museum).

=== Other subjects ===
- L'ensemble des gueux (1628-1631, etching)
- La Faiseuse de Koucks (1635, etching)
- “La Grande mariée juive” (1635, etching, drypoint, burin, black chalk)
- Three Oriental Figures (1641, etching, drypoint) and other Oriental or Polish subjects
Subjects

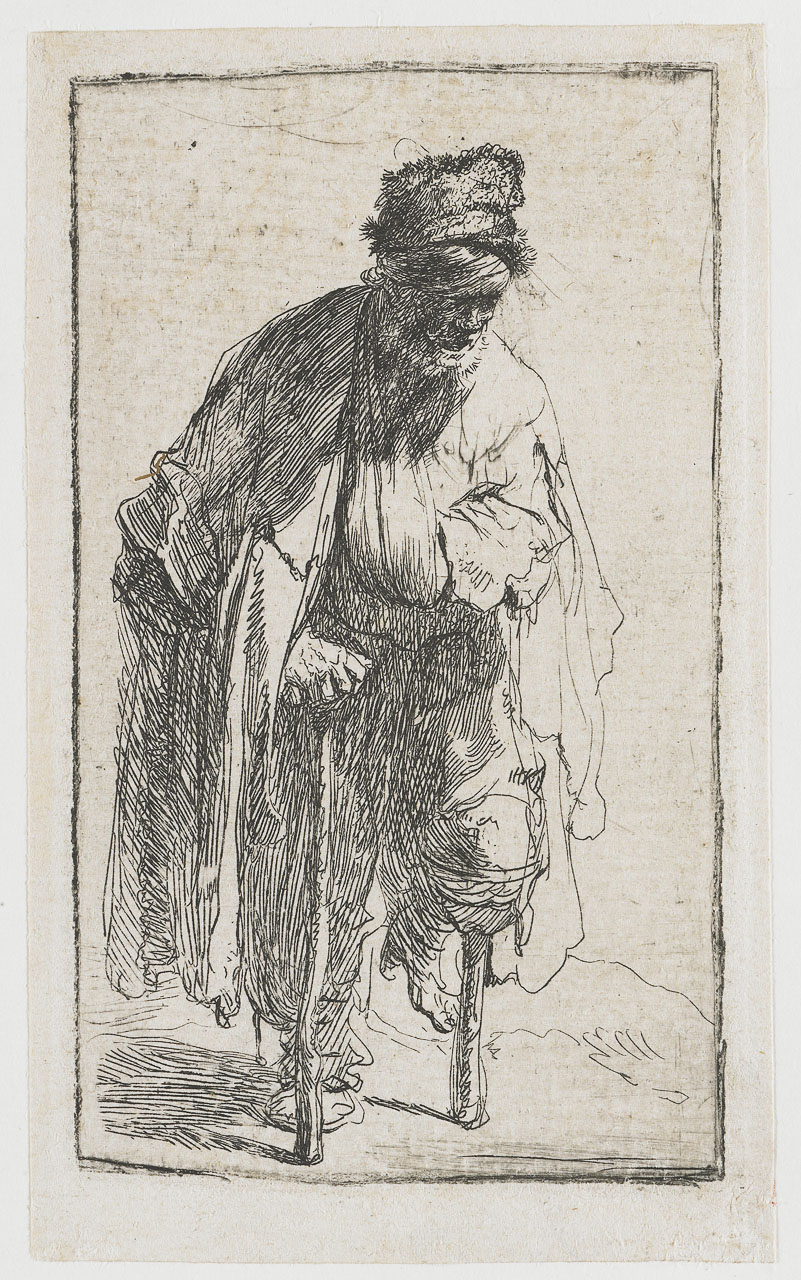
Beggar with a wooden leg, known as “Capteyn Eenbeen” (ca. 1630, Rijksmuseum Amsterdam).

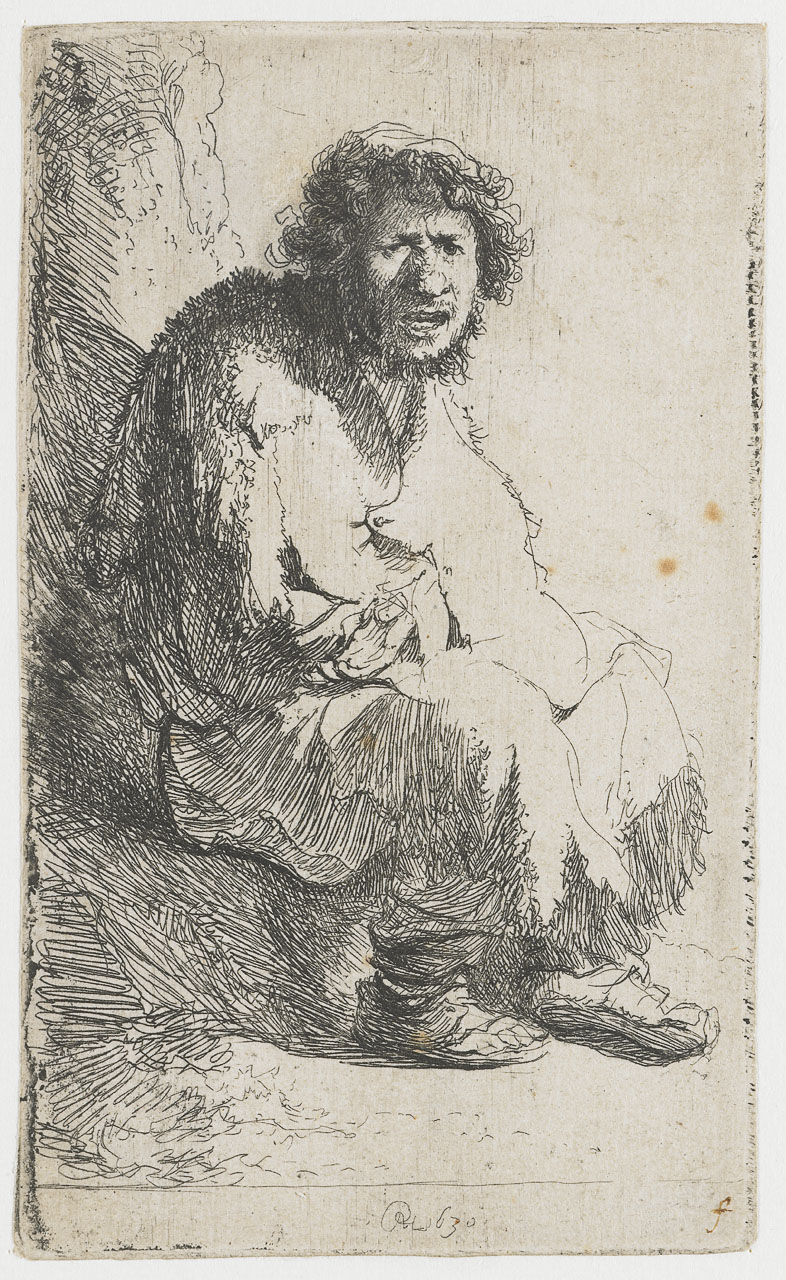
Beggar sitting on a clod of earth (1630, Rijksmuseum Amsterdam).

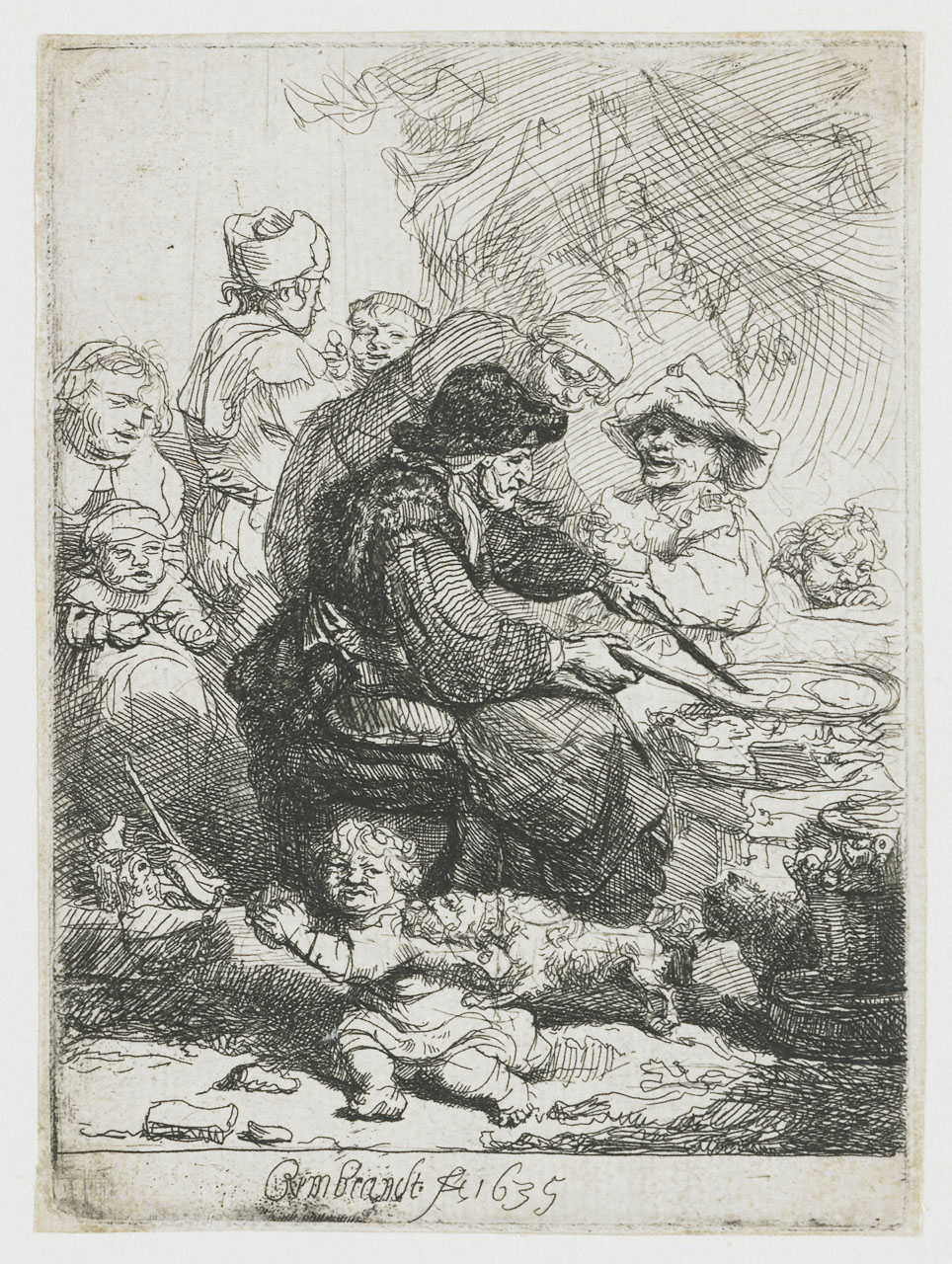
La Faiseuse de Koucks. (1635, Rijksmuseum Amsterdam).

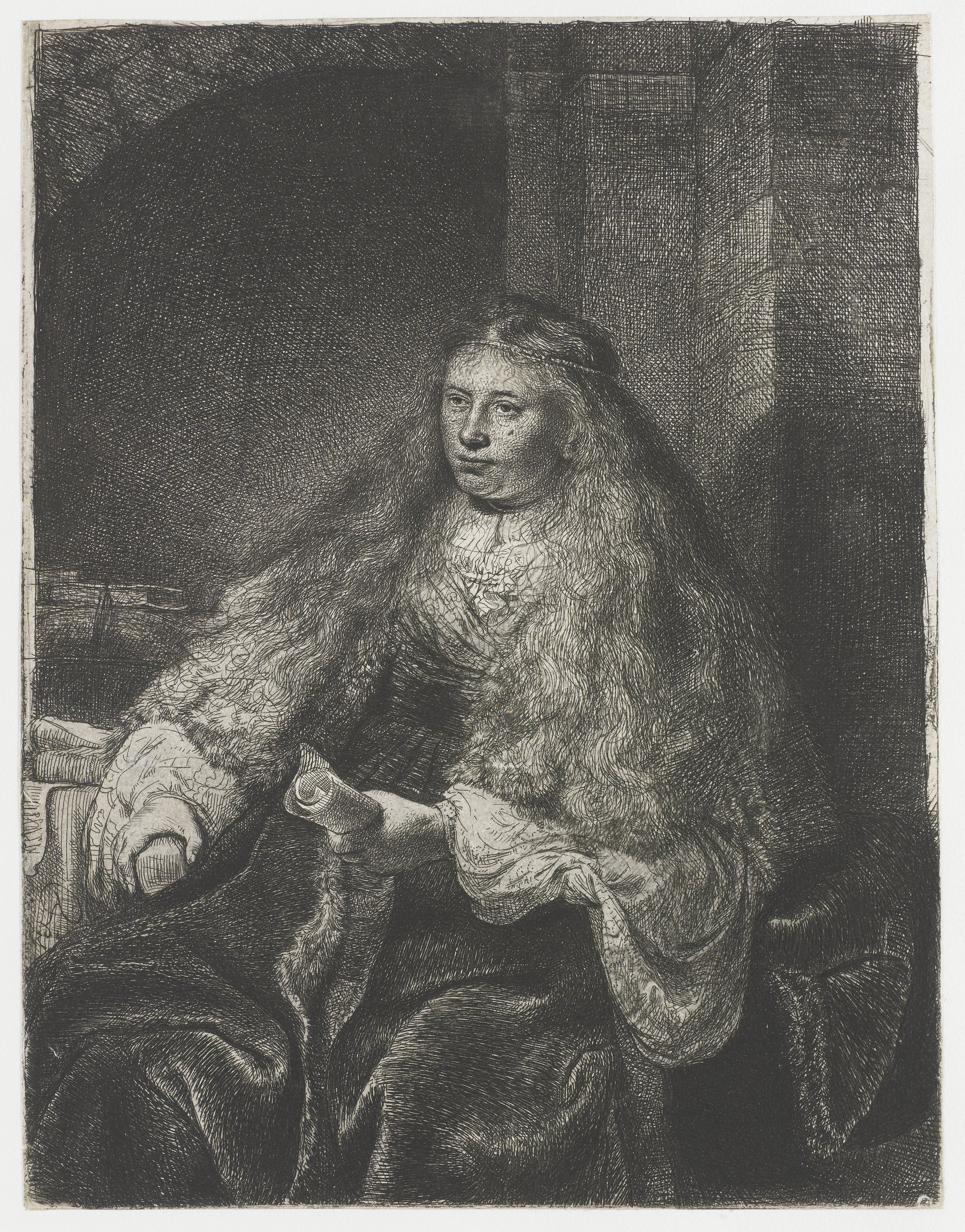
La Grande mariée juive (1635, Rijksmuseum Amsterdam).

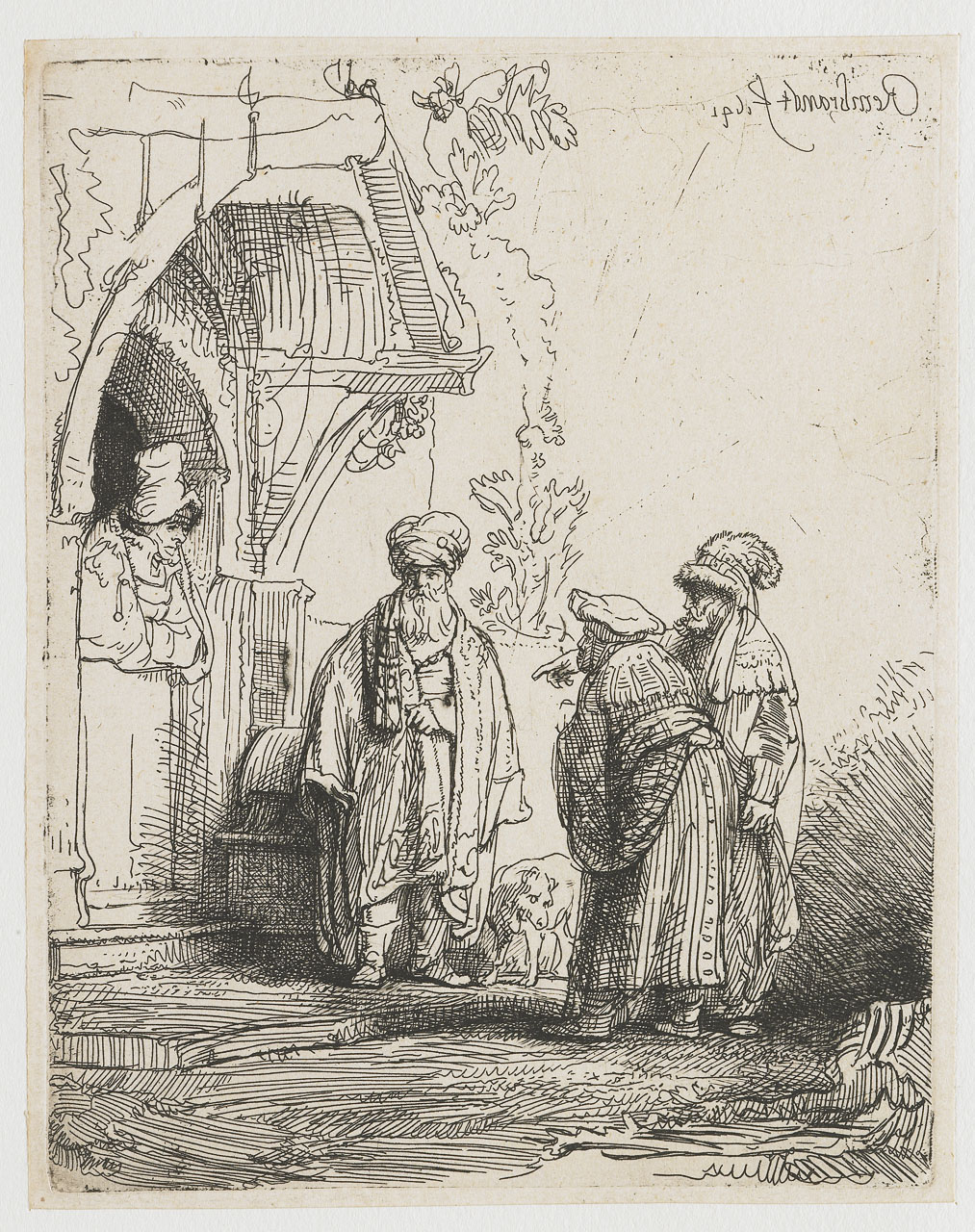
Trois figures orientales (1641, Rijksmuseum Amsterdam)

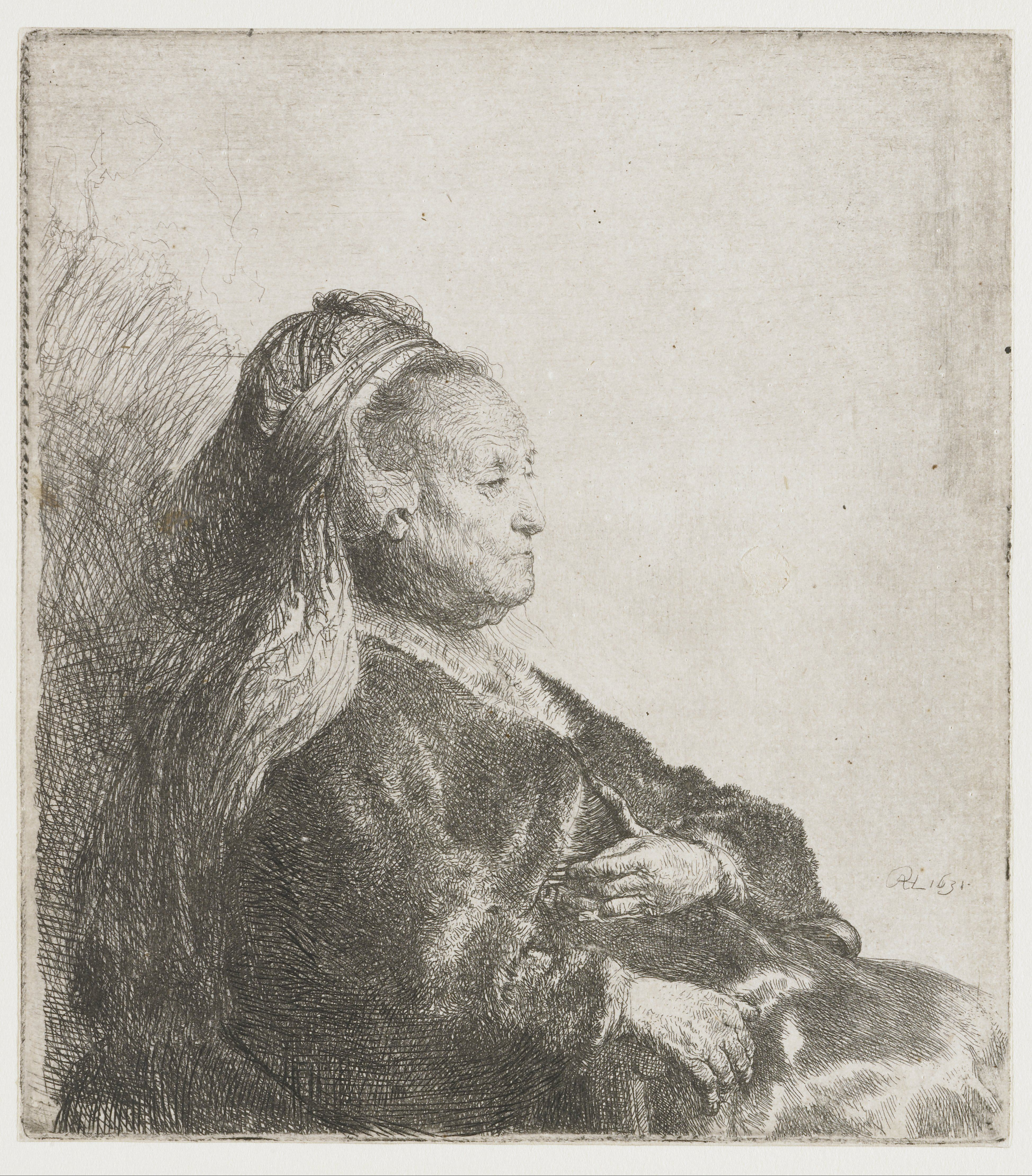
Old Woman with Oriental Hairdress (Rembrandt's mother?) (1631, Rijksmuseum Amsterdam)

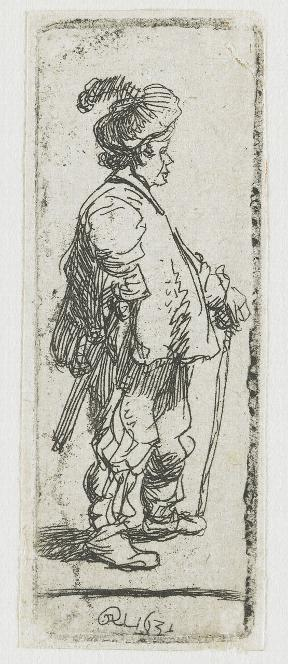
Figure polonaise (1631, Rijksmuseum Amsterdam)

=== Landscapes ===
- The Mill (1641, etching)
- The Three Trees (1643, etching and drypoint)
- “La Campagne du peseur d'or” (1651, etching and drypoint)

Still lifes, other subjects and nudes

- The Seashell (1650, etching, drypoint and burin on paper), Rembrandt's only still life.
- The Draftsman and his Model (unfinished, ca. 1639, etching, drypoint, and burin)
- The French Bed (1646, etching, drypoint, and burin)
Landscapes, dead nature and other subjects

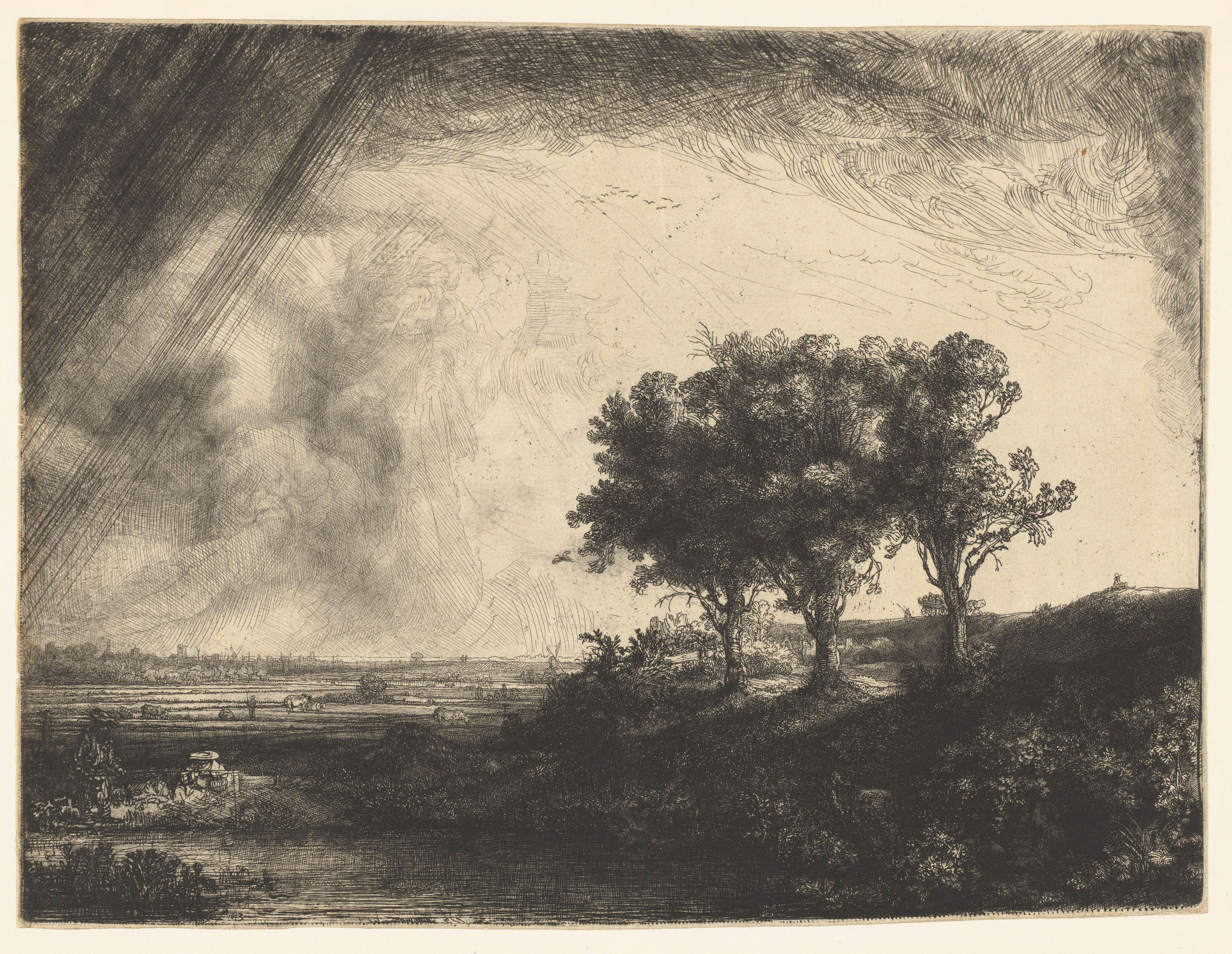
Les Trois Arbres (1643, Rijksmuseum Amsterdam).

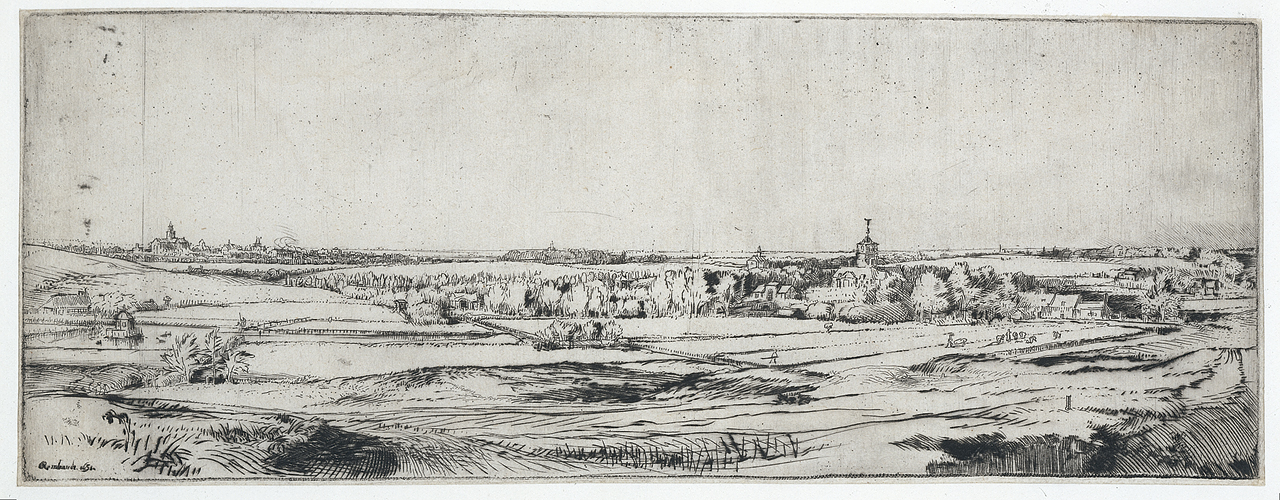
“The Campaign of the Gold Weigher” (1651, Rijksmuseum Amsterdam).

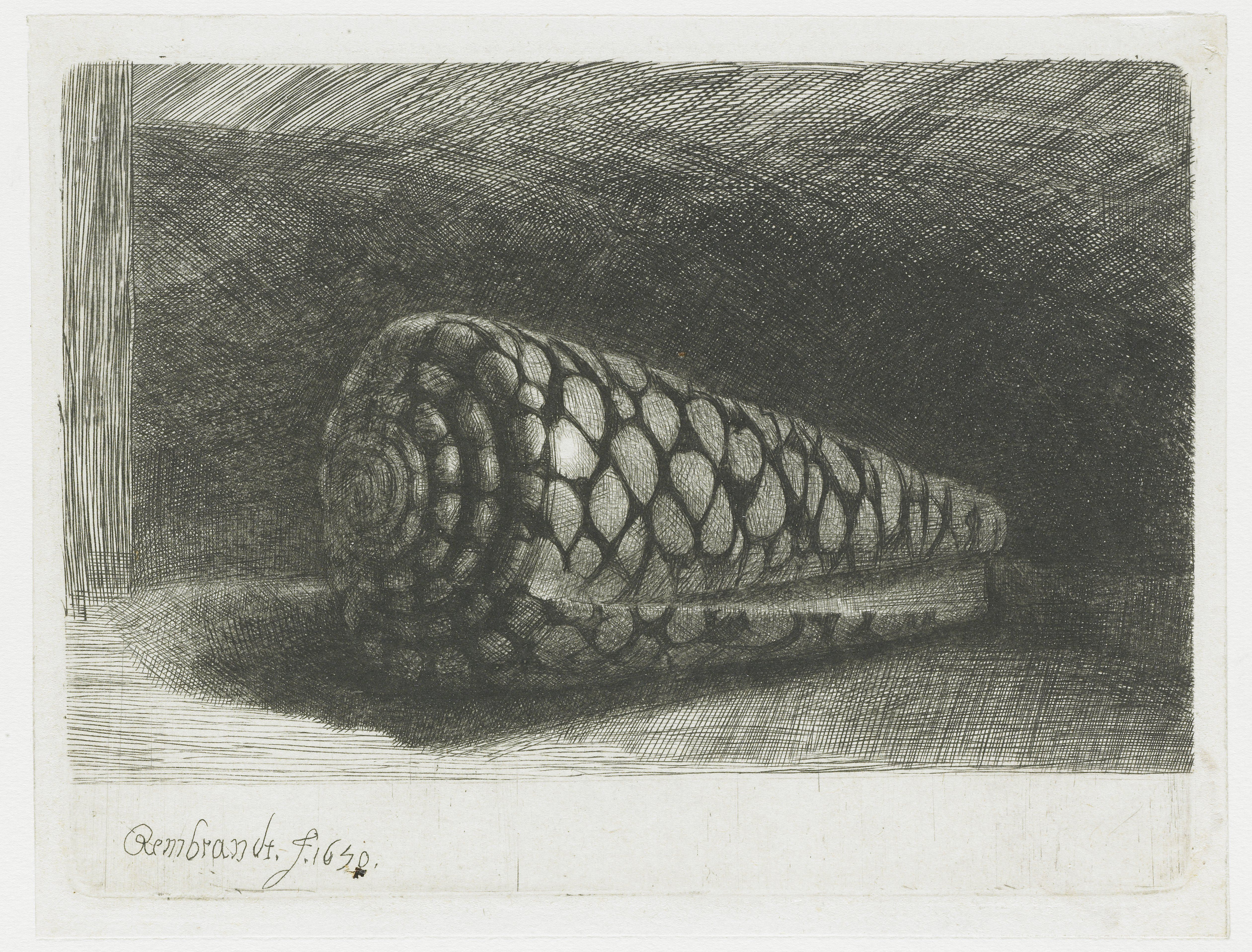
Le Coquillage (1650, Rijksmuseum Amsterdam).

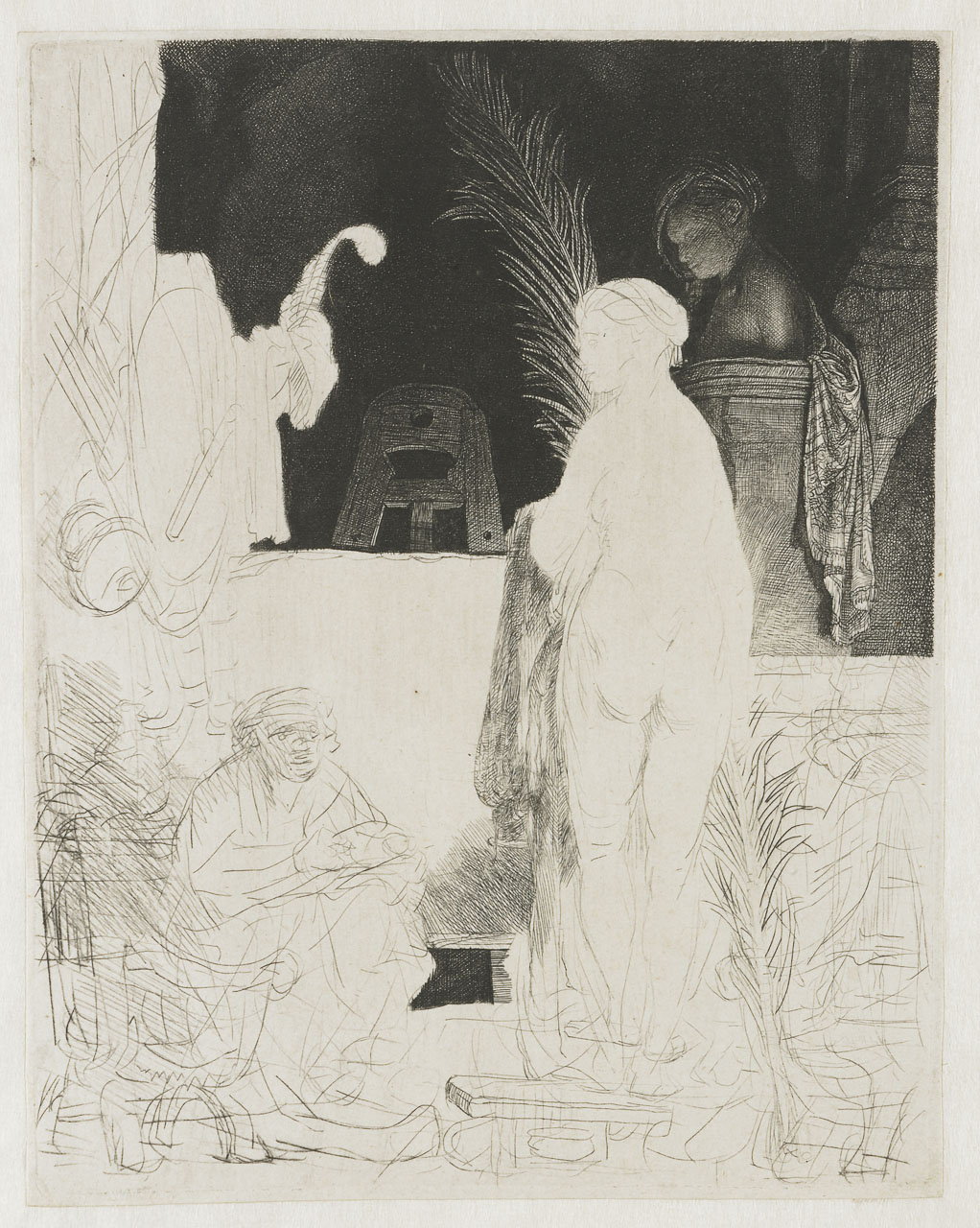
The Draughtsman and his Model (ca. 1639, Rijksmuseum Amsterdam).

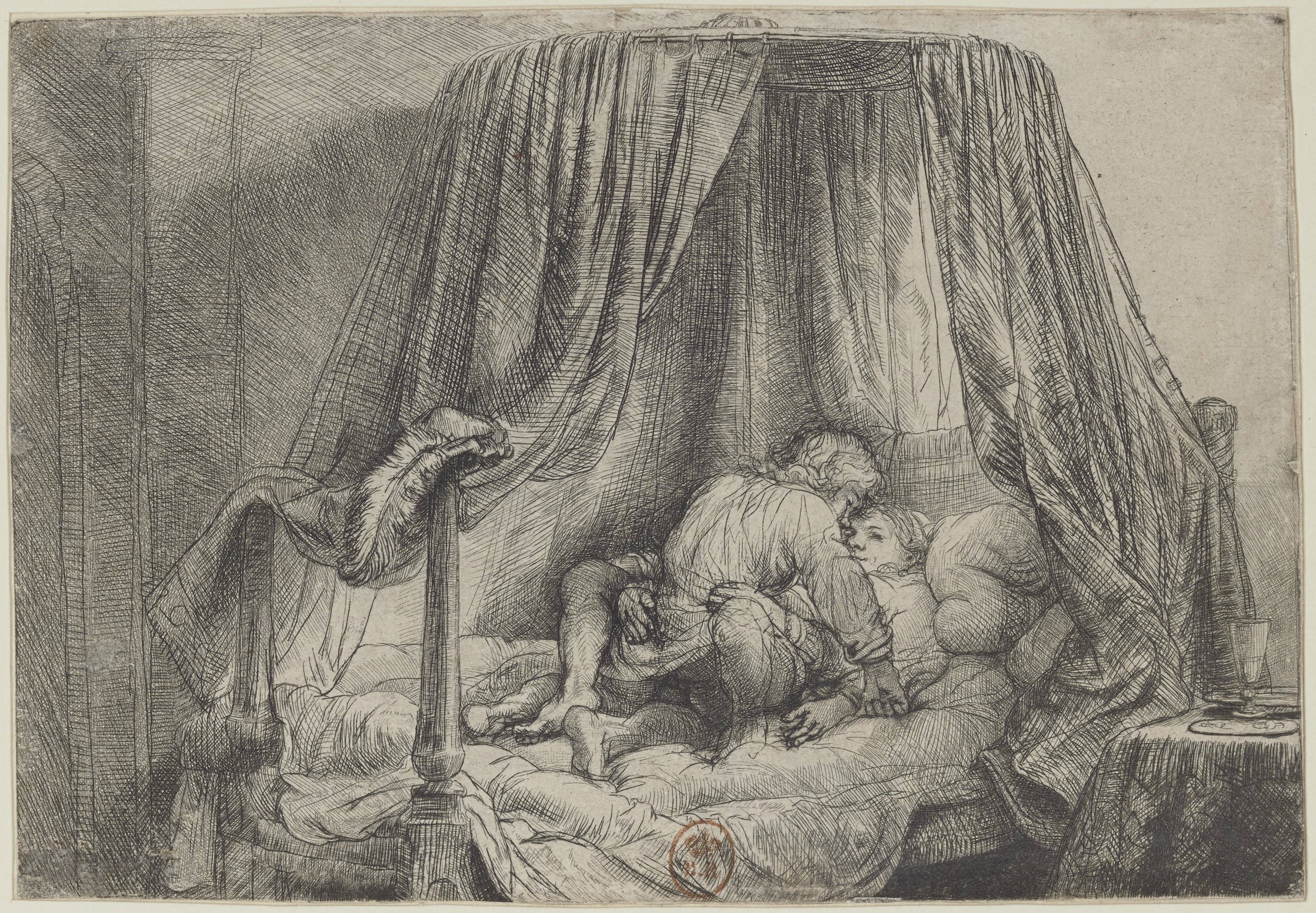
Le Lit à la française (1646, Bibliothèque nationale de France).

== Copper plates ==
=== Existing plates ===
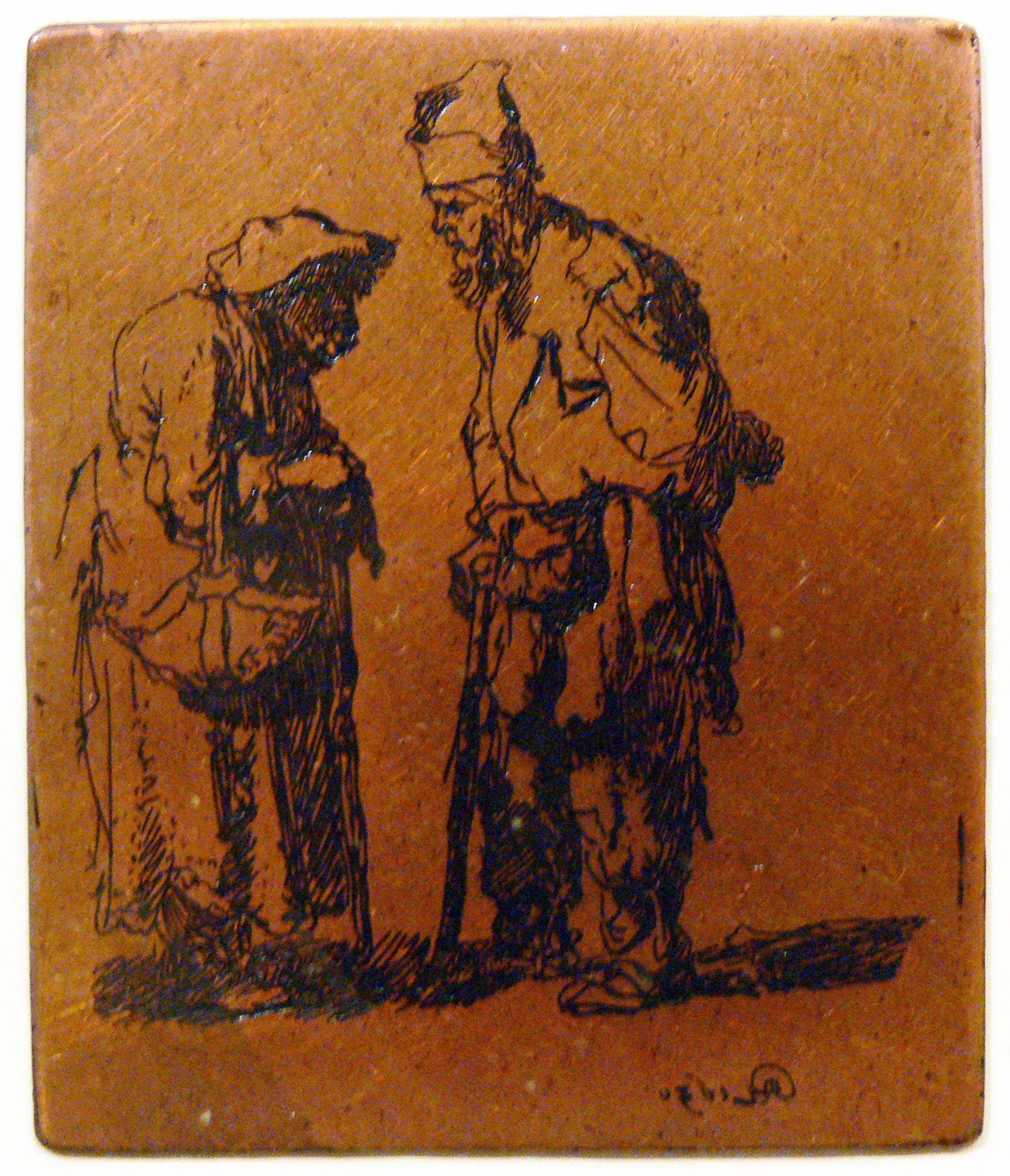
Copper plate for Gueux et gueuse (B. 164, Canadian private collection on deposit at the Rembrandthuis, Amsterdam).

According to the Musée du Petit Palais in 1986, seventy-nine original Rembrandt copperplates are known to exist. In Erik Hinterding's The History of Rembrandt's copperplates (1995), the author surveys the existing plates, lists and describes them all (except Jan Uytenbogaert (B. 281) and Première tête orientale (B. 286), to which he did not have access), and sets out to make an exhaustive list of all the owners of these plates throughout history.

Jan Six, a Dutch art collector, was given one of Rembrandt's most beautiful engravings, Portrait de Jan Six (B. 285), which is also, according to the Musée du Petit Palais, the most beautiful plate. In 2013, Claude-Jean Darmon described the print as “a masterpiece, without exaggeration, [which counts] among the etchings that reach the highest degree of completion”, adding that “never before has an etcher produced such deep black stamps as those of Jan Six”. It is part of the Six (Note: View works that have been in the Six collection on Wikimedia Commons.) collection, famous in its day for its paintings, engravings, and drawings.

The first known inventory is that made from the collection of Clement De Jonghe in 1679 (two years after his death); de Hoop Scheffer and Boon and Hinterding agree on the authenticity and authorship of all the plates identified in this inventory, with very slight modifications. However, some of the notes lack the precision required to identify the plates. Thanks to Hinterding's table, it is possible to trace the complete provenance of each plate and thus note that, after the sale of the De Jonghe collection, the De Haan sale in 1767 is the most important, where Pierre Fouquet bought many plates that then passed to Watelet, while all the others were scattered between numerous owners or disappeared.

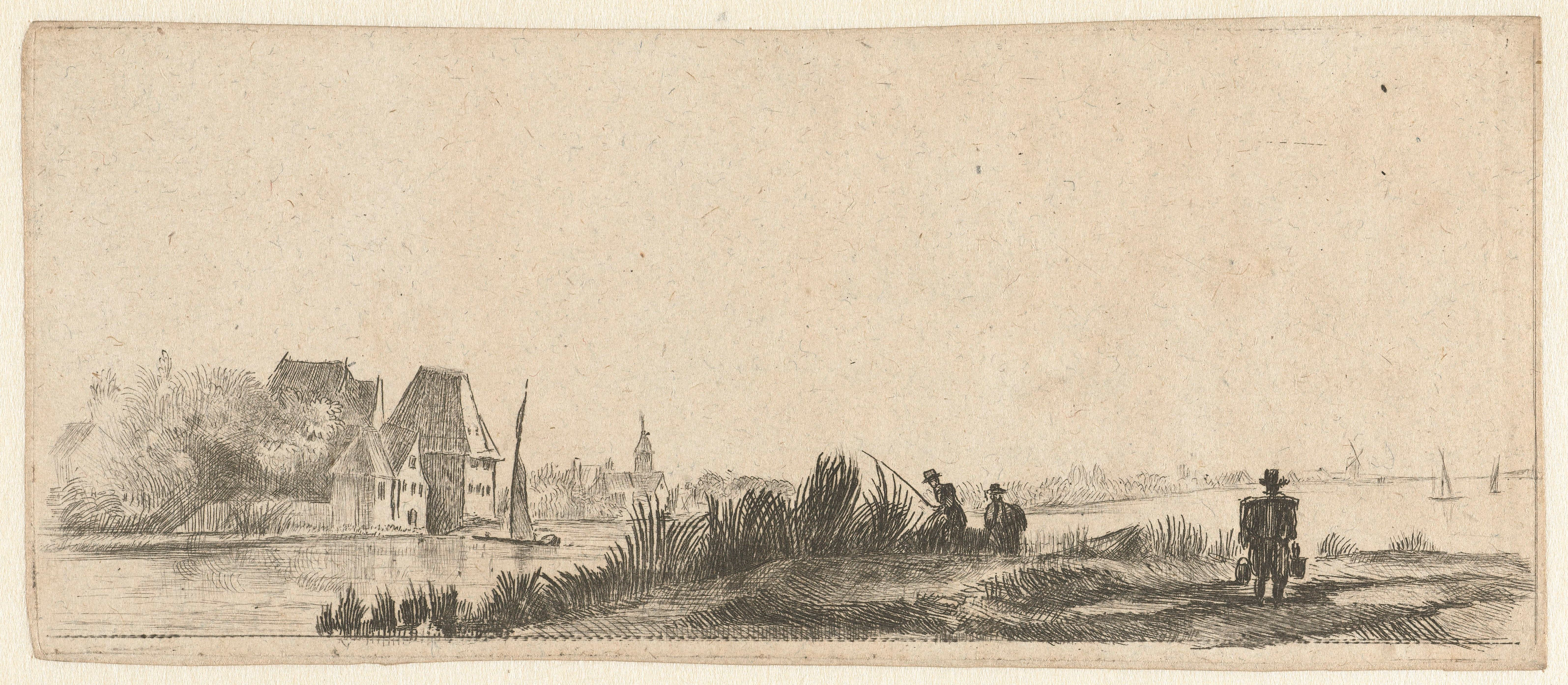
Landscape with two fishermen, by Claude-Henri Watelet (n. d.), based on an undated original by Rembrandt, not referenced by Bartsch, but by Woldemar von Seidlitz as “S. 384” and now in the British Museum.

In 1767, Claude-Henri Watelet acquired eighty-one original copper plates, and as an etcher himself, he reworked some of them (B. 69, B. 119, B. 273, B. 349) or reproduced them in aquatint (B. 19, B. 43, B. 62, B. 67, B. 68, B. 80, B. 86, B. 128, B. 268, B. 70). At the auction of the Watelet collection in 1786, Pierre-François Basan bought all the plates in his possession (the exact number is uncertain, but Hinterding calculates as many as eighty-three) and immediately published Recueil de quatre-vingt-cinq estampes originales... par Rembrandt, a work that would be published for over a century. Henry-Louis Basan, the former's son, published a list of the plates in his possession in 1803, numbering eighty-four, five of which are no longer accepted as being by Rembrandt. André-Charles Coppier strongly criticized the actions of Watelet and Basan, as well as Baillie (see below) and Norblin de La Gourdaine, who had all “ransacked” the original copperplates in their possession to make their states - thus excluding all etchings from these plates, and the states of those posthumously drawn from his studies.

While these various inventories are studied with great attention by specialists, the fate of Rembrandt's plates is subsequently very clear, as the following owners acquire the plate collections en bloc: Auguste Jean (circa 1810); Veuve Jean (1820); Auguste Bernard (1846); Michel Bernard (circa 1875). In 1906, the publisher Alvin-Beaumont bought the original plates and made prints from them, which he published in Les cuivres originaux de Rembrandt; his friend Robert Lee Humber acquired them and deposited them in the North Carolina Museum of Art in Raleigh. In 1956, on the occasion of the 350th anniversary of Rembrandt's birth, the museum organized an exhibition showing these plates along with etchings on loan from the National Gallery of Art in Washington and prints by Alvin-Beaumont. Only two have since been lost: La Mort de la Vierge (B. 99) and Le Christ se disputant avec les docteurs: petite plaque (B. 66).

Seventy-seven plates have survived and are preserved by the family of Robert Lee Humber, to which must be added three more, Jan Uytenbogaert (B. 281, Rosenwald Collection, Philadelphia), Jan Six (B. 285) and Première tête orientale (B. 286, Göttingen University Library) to make up the corpus of plates known to Hinterding in 1995 (seventy-nine plates known to the Musée du Petit Palais in 1986).

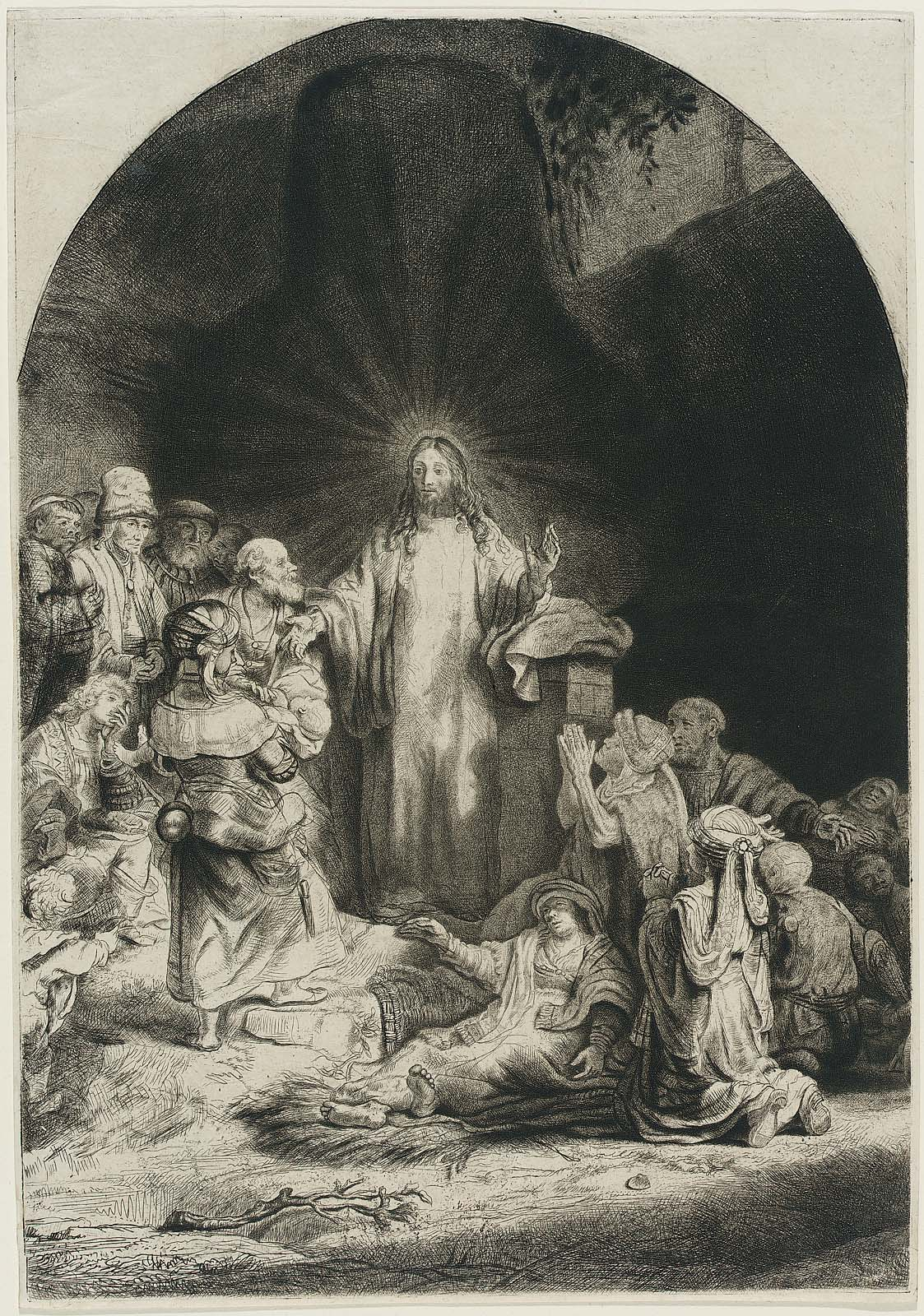
One of the four parts of La Pièce aux cent florins reworked by William Baillie. Museum of Fine Arts, Boston.

The Hundred Guilder Print by William Baillie

In 1775, Captain William Baillie, a British Army officer and Irish printer, bought the original plate of La Pièce aux cent florins, already quite worn from successive printings, from the American painter and engraver John Greenwood, and printed around a hundred proofs, which he largely reworked directly on the original copper plate. Eventually, he cut the plate into four pieces to make separate proofs, which he later reworked individually; in particular, he added the frame of an arch to the fragment containing Christ.

This initiative was highly controversial at the time, considered unworthy by some and welcome by others, as the plate was in poor condition. These final proofs were published by John Boydell.

The four original pieces reworked by Baillie (Note: Please note: these are the parts of the original proof cut according to Baillie's cuts. These will be reworked by Baillie, so they will be significantly different. To see the four pieces reworked by Baillie, view the image in very low resolution on the bnf.fr website.):

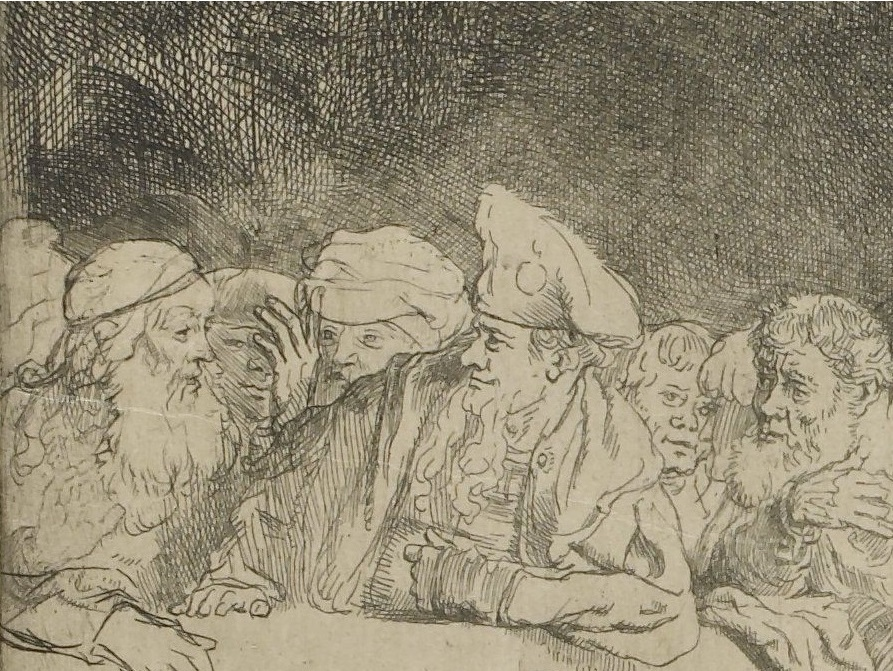
Part of the crowd of Pharisees

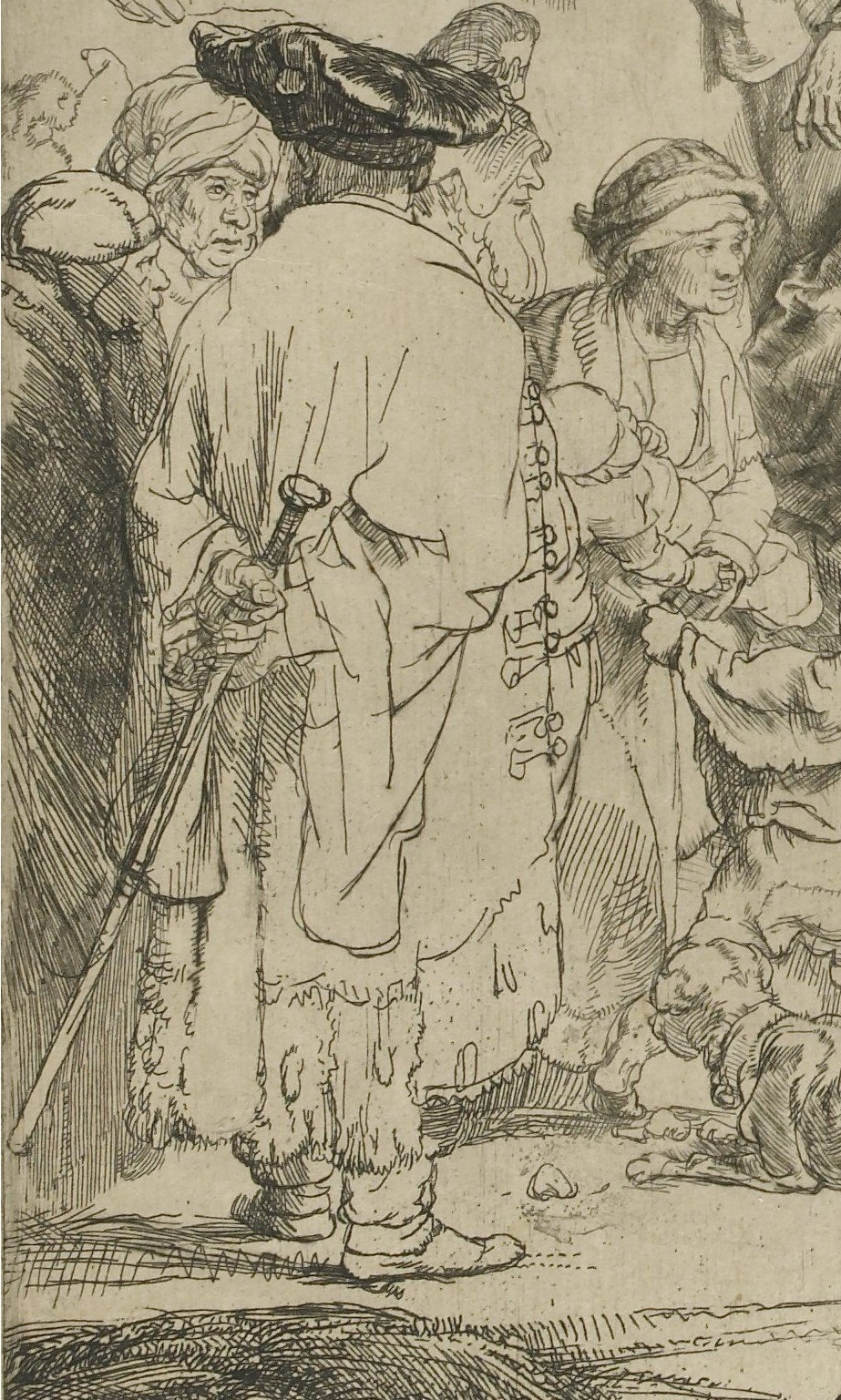
Anonymous figure from behind

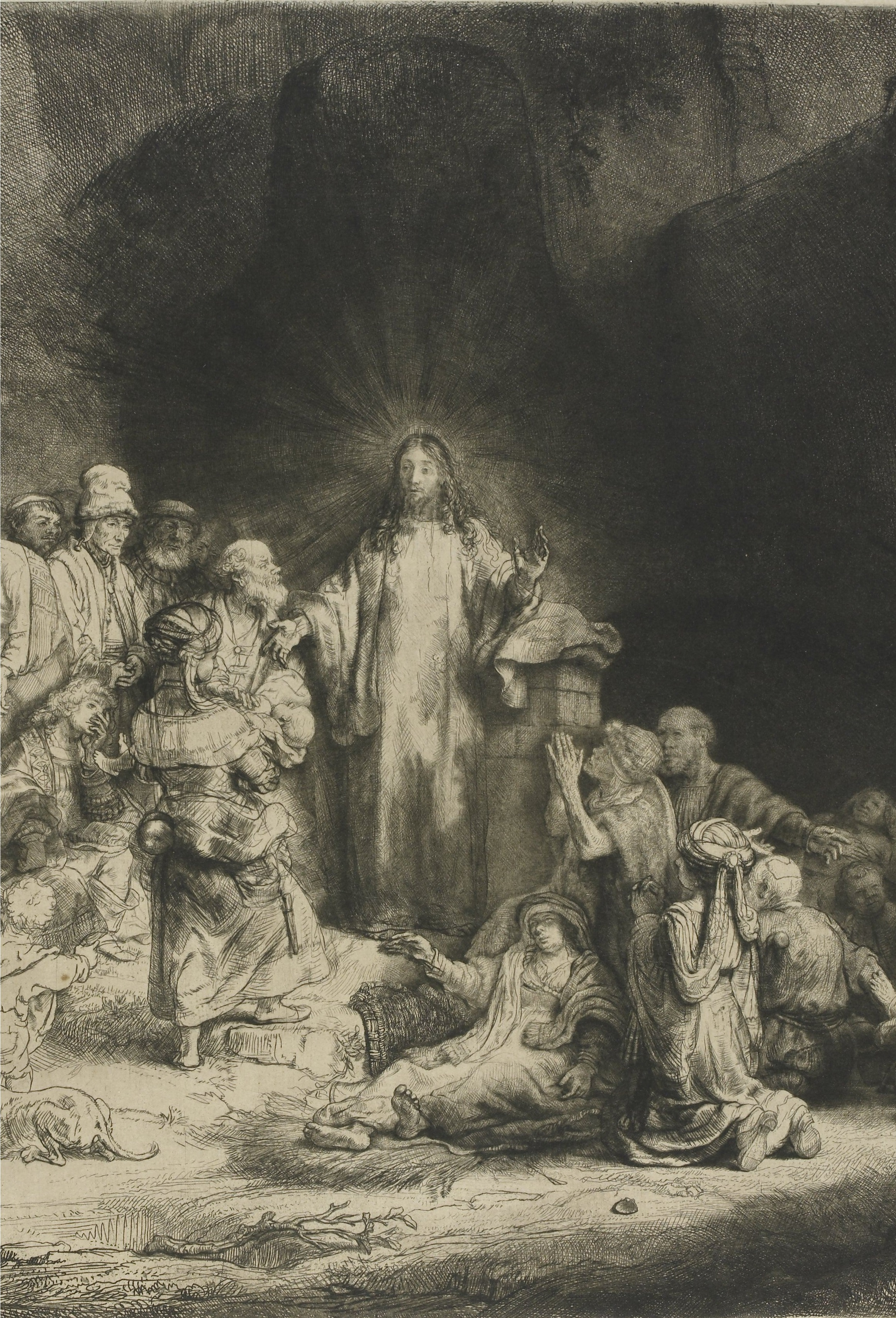
Whole Christ in the center

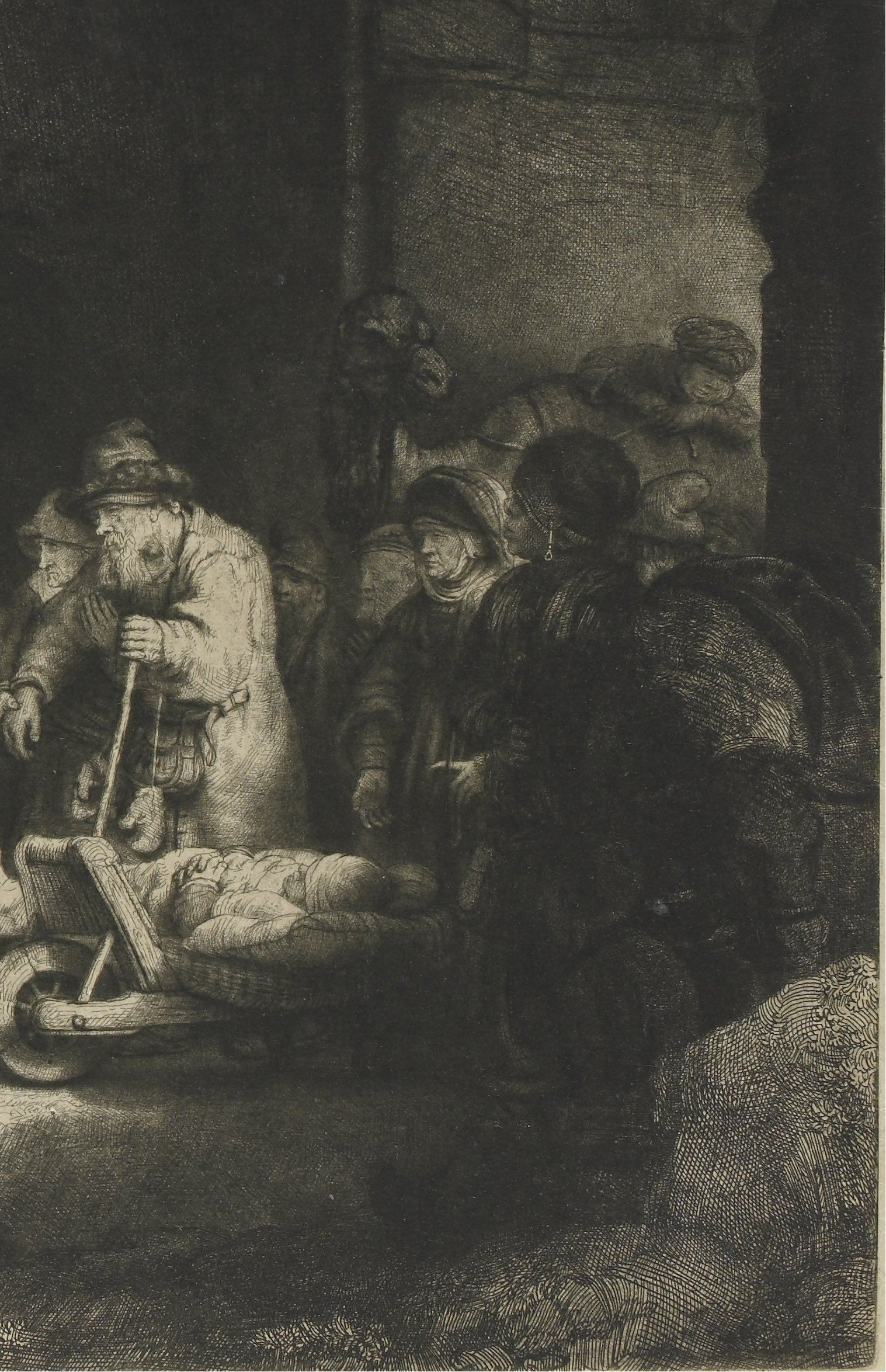
Entering the room of the poor and the camel

== Museum collections ==
Apart from a few very rare prints, mostly less important early studies, or "the informal printed scribbles from the artist's early years", most of his prints are not very rare by museum standards, and major print rooms have good collections. Both the Rijksmuseum and the British Museum, who claim to have the best collections, have over 1,000 impressions of the 300-odd prints; most of these can be viewed in great detail online. The degree to which these collections are displayed to the public or can easily be viewed by them in the print room, varies greatly. The Morgan Library & Museum in New York claims to have the best collection in America, with "impressions of most of the three hundred or so known etchings by Rembrandt, as well as multiple, often exceedingly rare impressions of various states"; it has "almost 500" images online.

== On the art market ==
In the early 20th century, Lucien Monod reported on the market value of Rembrandt's prints. He defined them as “first class”, with estimates ranging from 18 to 100,000 francs (La Pièce aux cent florins, sold in New York in 1922 to Harlowe et Cie).

A drypoint engraving by Rembrandt, Christ Presented to the People, sold on July 5, 2018 at Christie's for the exceptional printmaking price of 2.9 million euros, purchased, it seems, by New York financier and collector Leon Black. Ger Luijten, former curator of prints at the Rijksmuseum Amsterdam and director of the Fondation Custodia in Paris, explains: “When Rembrandt went bankrupt, and after his death, copper plates were sold and reused to make prints much later.

The drawing loses its finesse with the use of the printing plate, and as Paris expert Hélène Bonafous-Murat explains: “Rembrandt's plates were used for reprints until 1900.

They are often subsequently resold by unscrupulous people as genuine works by Rembrandt. At the December 19, 2018 sale at the Hôtel Drouot in Paris, a collection of eighty-five original prints by Rembrandt (1606-1669) and thirty-five others after the artist, produced in the Jean family's printing workshop on rue Saint-Jean de Beauvais between 1820 and 1846, was auctioned off for €88,200.

The major sale of early engravings at Christie's, New York, on January 29, 2019, features 21 sheets that fetched from $6,000 for a somewhat pale 1637 biblical scene of Abraham, to $468,000 for a Saint Jerome reading in an Italian landscape (B. 104). A small Self-portrait at the Window (B. 22) from 1648 sold for $35,000, and a chiaroscuro landscape of three trees in a clearing for $324,500.

In a New York sale by Christie's on January 24, 2023, 23 engravings by Rembrandt sold for between $5,670 and $730,800 for the fourth state of the Three Crosses, a subject highly prized by major collectors and museums.

== Main copyists and "interpreters" of Rembrandt's prints ==
Rembrandt's prints were copied extensively by artists, and some art historians have even compiled a list of engravings after Rembrandt. His paintings were also made into prints in the days before photographic reproductions.

In the 17th century, the main interpreters of Rembrandt's prints were:

- Willem Drost
- Jan Lievens
- Salomon Koninck
- Johannes Lutma
- Pieter Lastman
- Roelandt Savery
- Jonas Suyderhoef
- Jan van Vliet

In the 18th century:

- William Baillie
- Pierre-François Basan
- John Boydell
- Anne Claude de Caylus
- Charles Corbutt
- Dominique Vivant Denon
- John Dixon
- Robert Dunkarton
- Richard Earlom
- Étienne Fessard
- Jacob Gole
- Valentine Green
- John Greenwood
- Johann Jacobé
- Jean-Jacques Lagrenée
- Jacques-Philippe Le Bas
- James MacArdell
- Jean-Michel Moreau
- Jean-Pierre Norblin de La Gourdaine
- William Pether
- Bernard Picart
- Cornelis Ploos van Amstel
- Simon François Ravenet
- John Spilsbury
- Jan Stolker
- Robert Strange
- Louis Surugue
- James Ward
- Franz Wrenk

In the 19th and 20th centuries:

- Petrus Johannes Arendzen
- Charles Baude
- Firmin Bouisset
- Jan Claessens
- Charles Courtry
- Jean-Baptiste Danguin
- Alexander Deuchar
- Léopold Flameng
- Claude-Ferdinand Gaillard
- Karl Köpping
- Charles Paul Landon
- Hermann Struck
- Charles Turner
- Wilhelm Unger
- Charles Albert Waltner
- Anders Zorn

And several other anonymous ones.

== In popular culture ==
In April 2019, the organizers of the Dutch soccer championship announced that to mark Rembrandt Year (2019 being the 350th anniversary of the artist's birth), a special ball would be used for the 2019-2020 season: the "Rembrandtbal" displays prints by the artist, including landscapes and self-portraits. The balloon was presented at the Rijksmuseum Amsterdam.

== Prints cited according to Bartsch or Seidlitz numbering ==
- B. 7, Self-portrait in a soft hat and embroidered cloak, 1631 (see artwork).
- B. 19, Self-portrait with Saskia, 1636 (see artwork).
- B. 21, Self-Portrait Leaning on a Stone Sill, 1639 (see artwork).
- B. 22, Rembrandt Drawing at a Window, 1648 (see artwork).
- B. 23, Self-portrait (?) with Plumed Cap and Lowered Sabre, 1634 (see artwork).
- B. 28, Adam and Eve, 1638 (see artwork).
- B. 34, Abraham and Isaac, 1645 (see artwork).
- B. 39, Joseph and Putiphar's wife, 1634 (see artwork).
- B. 43, The Angel Departing from the Family of Tobias, 1641 (see artwork).
- B. 44, The Angel Appearing to the Shepherds, 1634 (see artwork).
- B. 48, The Circumcision of Christ, c. 1630 (see artwork).
- B. 51, The Presentation in the Temple with the Angel, 1630 (see artwork).
- B. 57, The Rest on the Flight: a Night Piece, c. 1644 (see artwork).
- B. 59, The Rest on The Flight into Egypt, c. 1626 (see artwork).
- B. 62, The Holy Family, c. 1632 (see artwork).
- B. 65, Christ Disputing with the Doctors: a Sketch, 1652 (see artwork).
- B. 66, Christ Disputing with the Doctors: Small Plate, 1630 (see artwork).
- B. 67, Christ Preaching (La Petite Tombe), c. 1652 (see artwork).
- B. 68, The Tribute Money, c. 1635 (see artwork).
- B. 69, Christ driving the money-changers from the Temple, 1635 (see artwork).
- B. 70, Christ and the Woman of Samaria, 1658 (see artwork).
- B. 71, Christ and the Woman of Samaria: among Ruins, 1634 (see artwork).
- B. 72, The Raising of Lazarus, 1642 (see artwork).
- B. 73, The Raising of Lazarus: the Larger Plate, c. 1632 (see artwork).
- B. 74, Christ Preaching (The Hundred Guilder Print), c. 1649 (see artwork).
- B. 76, Christ Presented to the People: the Oblong Plate, 1655 (see artwork).
- B. 77, Christ before Pilate, 1636 (see artwork).
- B. 78, The Three Crosses, 1653 (see artwork).
- B. 80, The Crucifixion: Small Plate, c. 1635 (see artwork).
- B. 81, The Descent from the Cross: the Second Plate, 1633 (see artwork).
- B. 86, The Entombment, c. 1652-1656 (see artwork).
- B. 88, Christ at Emmaus: the Smaller Plate, 1634 (see artwork).
- B. 90, The Good Samaritan, 1633 (see artwork).
- B. 91, The Return of the Prodigal Son, 1636 (see artwork).
- B. 99, The Death of the Virgin, 1639 (see artwork).
- B. 103, St. Jerome beside the pollard willow, 1648 (see artwork).
- B. 104, Saint Jerome Reading in an Italian Landscape, c. 1653 (see artwork).
- B. 105, St. Jerome in a Dark Chamber, 1642 (see artwork).
- B. 109, Death Appearing to a Wedded Couple from an Open Grave, 1639 (see artwork).
- B. 116, The Small Lion Hunt (with one lion), c. 1629 (see artwork).
- B. 119, The Strolling Musicians, c. 1635 (see artwork).
- B. 124, The Pancake Woman, 1635 (see artwork).
- B. 128, Woman at a Door-Hatch Talking to a Man and Children, 1641 (see artwork).
- B. 152, The Persian, 1632 (see artwork).
- B. 164, Beggar Man and Beggar Woman Conversing, 1630 (see artwork).
- B. 173, Beggar Seated Warming his Hands at a Chafing Dish, c. 1630 (see artwork).
- B. 176, A Blind Hurdy-gury Player and Family Receiving Alms, 1648 (see artwork).
- B. 186, Le lit à la française, 1646 (see artwork).
- B. 187, The Monk in the Cornfield, c. 1646 (see artwork).
- B. 201, Diana at the Bath, c. 1631 (see artwork).
- B. 202, The Woman with the Arrow, 1661 (see artwork).
- B. 208, 'Six’s bridge’, 1645 (see artwork).
- B. 218, Landscape with a Square Tower, 1650 (see artwork).
- B. 221, Landscape with a Road beside a Canal, c. 1652 (see artwork).
- B. 222, Clump of Trees with a Vista, 1652 (see artwork).
- B. 228, Cottages beside a Canal, c. 1645 (see artwork).
- B. 264, Jan Antonides van der Linden, 1665 (see artwork).
- B. 266, Jan Cornelis Sylvius, Preacher, 1633 (see artwork).
- B. 268, Young Man in a Velvet Cap, 1637 (see artwork).
- B. 271, Portrait of Cornelis Claesz. Anslo, 1641 (see artwork).
- B. 272, Clement de Jonghe, Printseller, 1651 (see artwork).
- B. 273, Abraham Francen, apothecary, c. 1657 (see artwork).
- B. 278, Portrait of Dr. Ephraïm Bueno (1599-1665), 1647 (see artwork).
- B. 280, Jan Cornelis Sylvius, preacher, 1646 (see artwork).
- B. 281, Jan Wtenbogaert, 1639 (see artwork).
- B. 285, Portrait of Jan Six (1618-1700), 1647 (see artwork).
- B. 286, The First Oriental Head, 1635 (see artwork).
- B. 318, Philosopher with hourglass, n. d. (see artwork).
- B. 320, Self-portrait in a cap, with eyes wide open, 1630 (see artwork).
- B. 340, The Great Jewish Bride, 1635 (see artwork).
- B. 342, The Little Jewish Bride (Saskia in Sainte Catherine), 1638 (see artwork).
- B. 345, A Woman, Reading, 1634 (see artwork).
- B. 349, The Artist’s Mother with Her Hand on Her Chest: Small Bust, 1631 (see artwork).
- B. 365, Studies of the Head of Saskia and Others, 1636 (see artwork).
- B. 366, Sheet of studies of men’s heads, c. 1630-1631 (see artwork).
- B. 367,Three Heads of Women, One Lightly Etched (Saskia), c. 1635-1639 (see artwork).
- B. 374, Three Studies of Old Men’s Heads, c. 1630 (see artwork).
- B. 398, The Circumcision of Christ, c. 1626 (see artwork).

== Bibliography ==
- Wilson, Thomas (1836). A Descriptive Catalogue of the Prints of Rembrandt. J. F. Setchel.
- Holm, Bevers; Schatborn, Peter; Welzel, Barbara (1991). Rembrandt: the Master and his Workshop: Drawings and Etchings. New Haven, Londres: Yale University Press, National Gallery Publications. ISBN 0-300-05151-4.
- Biörklund, George (1968). Rembrandt's etchings: true and false. Stockholm: Esselte Aktiebolag.
- Blanc, Charles (1859). L'œuvre complet de Rembrandt: catalogue raisonné de toutes les eaux-fortes du maître et de ses peintures... orné de bois gravés et de quarante eaux-fortes tirées à part et rapportées dans le texte. Paris: Gide.
- Blanc, Charles (1861). L'œuvre complet de Rembrandt: catalogue raisonné de toutes les eaux-fortes du maître et de ses peintures... orné de bois gravés et de quarante eaux-fortes tirées à part et rapportées dans le texte. Paris: Gide.
- Boon, Karel G. (1963). Rembrandt : Gravure: œuvre complet. Paris: Arts et métiers graphiques.
- Boon, Karel G. (1989). Rembrandt: L'Œuvre gravé. Paris: Arts et métiers graphiques - Flammarion. ISBN 2-08-012952-X.
- Coppier, André-Charles (1929). Les eaux-fortes authentiques de Rembrandt. Firmin-Didot.
- Heer, Ed de (1999). «Technique of Etching», dans Nel Segno di Rembrandt, Venise, Giuseppe Bergamini and Bert W. Meijer.
- Hind, Arthur Mayger (1900). A Catalogue of Rembrandt's Etchings: chronologically arranged and completely illustrated. Londres: Methuen and co.
- Hinterding, Erik (1995). The history of Rembrandt's copperplates: with a catalog of those that survive. Zwolle. ISBN 90-400-9744-5.
- Hinterding, Erik (2008). Rembrandt etchings: from the Frits Lungt Collection. Paris: Thoth Publishers Bussum. ISBN 978-90-6868-417-9.
- Hinterding, Eric, Luijten, Ger, Royalton-Kisch, Martin, Rembrandt the Printmaker, 2000, British Museum Press/Rijksmuseum, Amsterdam, ISBN 071412625X
- Middleton, Charles Henry (1878). A Descriptive catalogue of the etched work of Rembrandt van Rhyn. Albemarle Street.
- Monod, Lucien (1931). Aide-mémoire de l'amateur et du professionnel: le prix des estampes, anciennes et modernes, prix atteints dans les ventes - suites et états, biographies et bibliographies. A. Morancé.
- Prigot, Aude (2018). La réception de Rembrandt à travers les estampes en France au XVIIIe siècle. Rennes: Presses universitaires de Rennes. ISBN 978-2-7535-7552-3.
- Renouard de Bussierre, Sophie (1986). Petit Palais, Rembrandt: Eaux-fortes. Paris Musées. ISBN 2-905028-10-6.
- White, Christopher; Buvelot, Quentin (1999). Ernst van de Wetering, Volker Manuth, Marieke de Winkel, Edwin Buijsen, Peter Schatbron, Ben Broos et Ariane van Suchtelen (trad. Jean Raoul Mengarduque), Rembrandt par lui-même. Paris: Flammarion. ISBN 978-90-400-9330-2.
