= B103 =

B103 may refer to:

- B103 (New York City bus), bus route in the New York City borough of Brooklyn
- Bacillus virus B103, a genus of the virus species Picovirinae
- St. Jerome beside a pollard willow, etching B103 on the list of etchings by Rembrandt
- B103, a locomotive in the British CIE 101 Class

== Radio stations ==
- KBWS-FM (102.9 FM, "Superstar Country B103"), in the Sisseton, South Dakota, area
- WZKR (103.3 FM, formerly broadcast a country format as B103), in the Meridian, Mississippi, area
- WGFB (103.1 FM, "The New B103 - Today's Lite Rock"), in the Rockton, Illinois, area
- WWOF (103.1 FM, formerly WAIB, "New Country B103"), in the Tallahassee, Florida, area
- KBIU (103.3 FM, formerly "B103 The B"), in the Lake Charles, Louisiana, area
- WFXD (103.3 FM, formerly "B103" under its country format), in the Marquette, Michigan, area
- CKQQ-FM, (103.1 FM, "B-103"), in the Kelowna, British Columbia, area
- WBDX (103.1 FM, "The New B103, The Outrageous FM!"), in the Trenton, Georgia, area
