= Christ Presented to the People =

Etching by Rembrandt

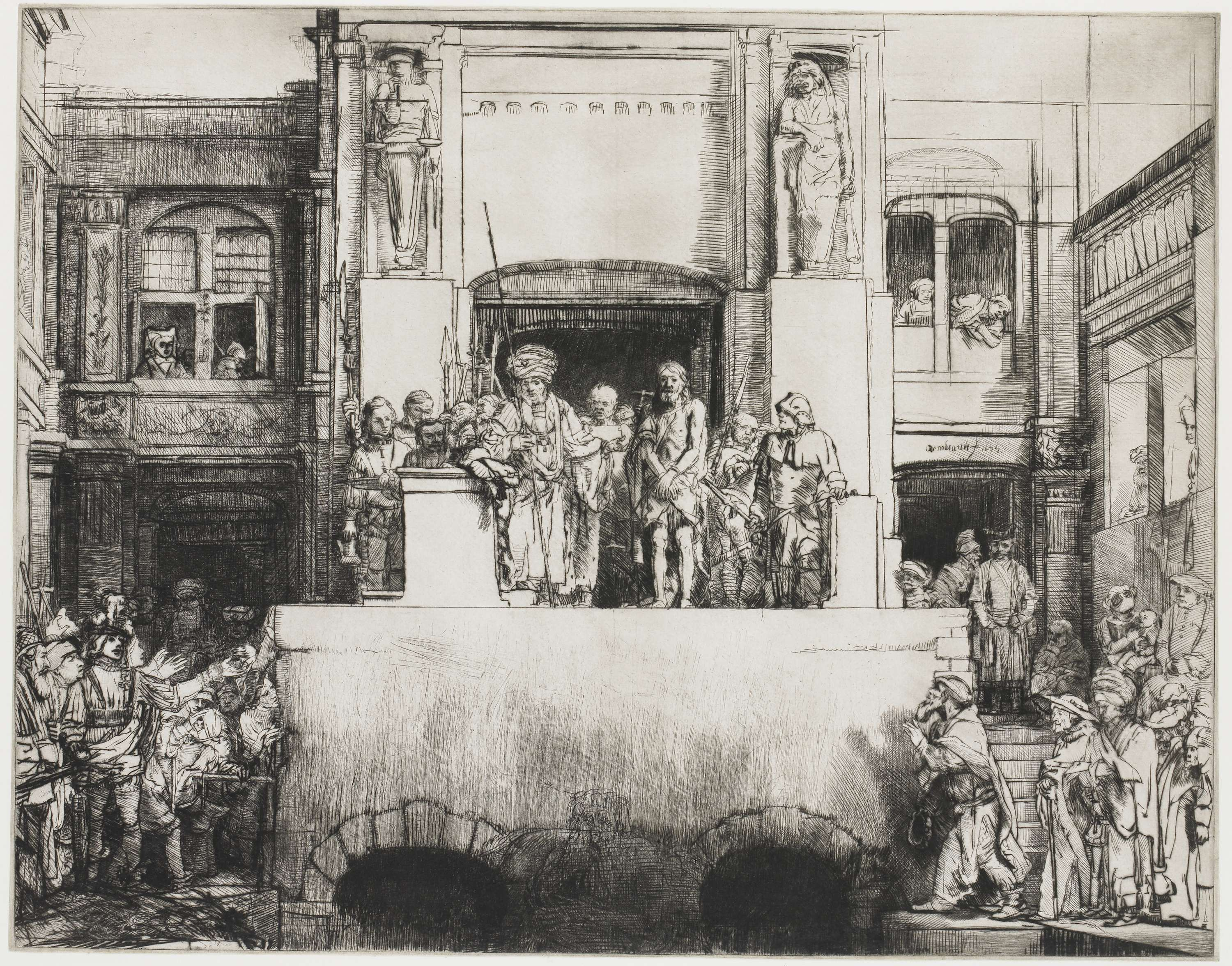
Rembrandt van Rijn, Ecce Homo, state viii, c. 1665, Rijksmuseum

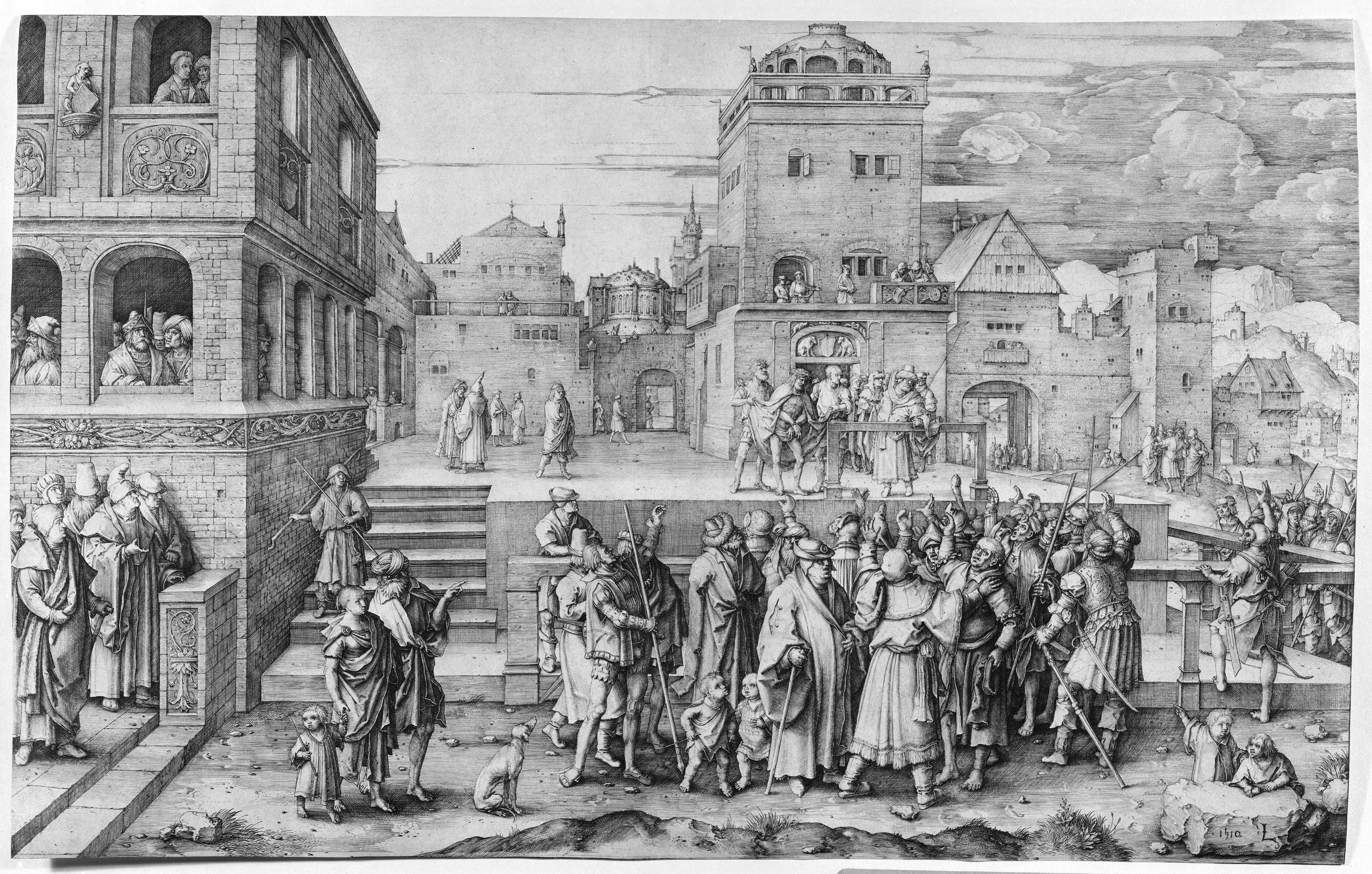
Lucas van Leyden, Ecce Homo, 1510, Metropolitan Museum of Art

Christ Presented to the People, also known as Ostentatio Christi or Ecce Homo, is a drypoint print by Rembrandt van Rijn which exists in eight states, all c. 1655. It is one of the two largest prints made by Rembrandt, about 15 by 18 inches (38 cm × 46 cm), similar to his 1653 engraving of The Three Crosses. It has been described by Christie's as "at the summit of the western printmaking tradition".

== Description ==
The print depicts an episode from the Passion of Jesus in which Pontius Pilate presents Jesus to the people, saying "ecce homo" ("behold the man"), offering to free either Jesus or the notorious criminal Barabbas, and asks the crowd to choose between them. The scene echoes contemporary judicial practice in the Netherlands, in which magistrates bearing a staff of office would present a condemned criminal to the public from a raised balcony or platform. The building in the background resembles the new Town Hall in Amsterdam by Jacob van Campen, completed in 1655 and now the Royal Palace of Amsterdam.

The main figures are on a platform above the crowd, in front of a dark archway. Accompanied by armed guards, Pilate stands with a long staff, wearing an oriental turban and long gown, gesturing to the two prisoners who stand bound to the right. To the left is a scribe and youth with an ewer of water, ready for Pilate to wash his hands. Niches in the building behind them have allegorical sculptures of Justice and Fortitude. The building continues with windows and balconies on either side above arched doorways, one window perhaps occupied by Pilate's wife. Rembrandt has included a motley collection of characters in the crowd, with some Jewish elders observing to the right.

Rembrandt was inspired by Lucas van Leyden's 1510 etching of the same scene, of which he owned a copy. Rembrandt continued producing prints until the 1660s, but this was the last depicting the Passion.

== States ==
Rembrandt's prints were made from a drypoint engraving on copper plate, and eight states are known. The first version, state i, measures 383 by 455 millimetres (15.1 in × 17.9 in), and the final version, state viii, is slightly shorter, measuring 358 by 455 centimetres (141 in × 179 in).

Save for the architecture to the top right, the first state was nearly complete. Only eight versions of the first state are known, printed on expensively imported yellowish Japanese paper. Seven are in public collections, at Kupferstichkabinett Berlin of the Staatliche Museen zu Berlin, the British Museum in London, the Morgan Library and Museum in New York, the Ashmolean Museum in Oxford, two in Paris at the Dutuit collection at the Musée du Petit Palais and the collection of Edmond de Rothschild at the Musée du Louvre, and at the Graphische Sammlung Albertina in Vienna. The last remaining impression of the first state in private hands was sold at Christie's in July 2018 from the collection of the late Samuel Josefowitz for £2.2 million, setting a record for an Old Master print. No impressions of the second to fourth states are held privately.

Only minor changes were made in the next two states. The second state adds cross-hatched shading to the doorway to the left, and the third state adds similar shading to the right leg of the gesturing man on the left of the platform. The missing architecture to the top right is completed in the fourth state, with a balustrade added above the windows; at the same time, an inch (25 mm) was removed from the top of the print in this state, eliminating the architrave above the central building, allowing Rembrandt to print the whole composition on just a single sheet of paper: the first three impressions needed a thin strip of paper to be added along the top.

By the fifth state, several dozen impressions have been made and the soft copper plate was showing signs of wear, and some shading is added to the windows to the right. The wear was countered in the sixth state by significant reworking in some areas, including removing the crowd of figures in front of the central platform: only two impressions are known of this version. By the seventh state, two arches have been added to the front wall of the platform. Rembrandt signed and dated the seventh version, and then added more changes to the eighth and last version.

It is unclear why Rembrandt decided to print intermediate versions of the print, and indeed why they were printed on expensive imported paper. Usual practice was to take impression at each stage while the engraving developed on cheap paper which could be discarded, and then make several impressions of the completed version for sale. Only the last two states are signed and dated above the archway to the right of the central platform ("Rembrandt f. 1655"), suggesting he may have regarded the others as only intermediate stages or artist's proofs. However, Rembrandt may have been motivated by a commercial desire to sell rare limited editions to collectors. Arnold Houbraken noted in 1718 that Rembrandt would make small changes so he could sell prints as new designs.

== Gallery ==
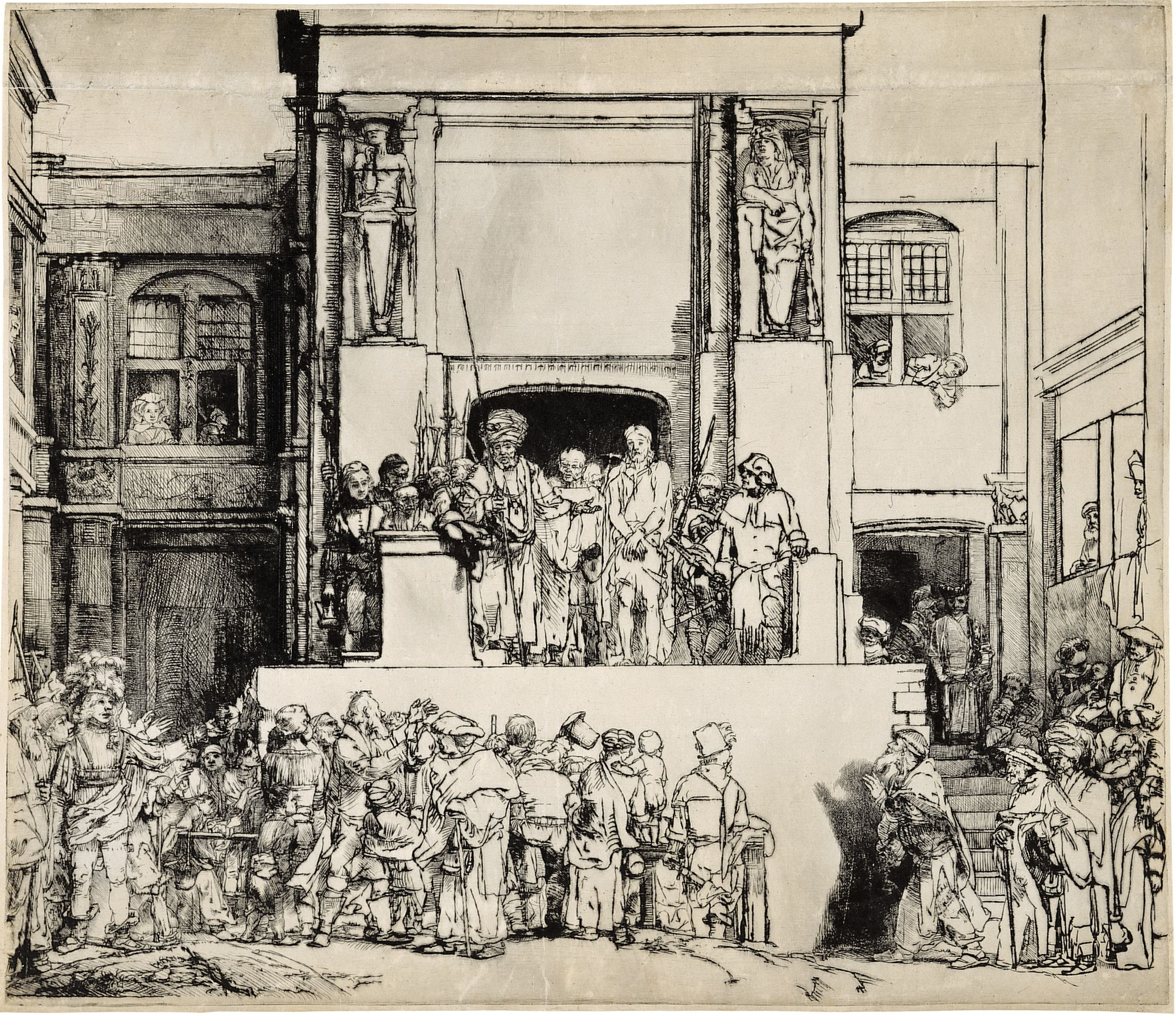
Version at the Saint Louis Art Museum (state ii)

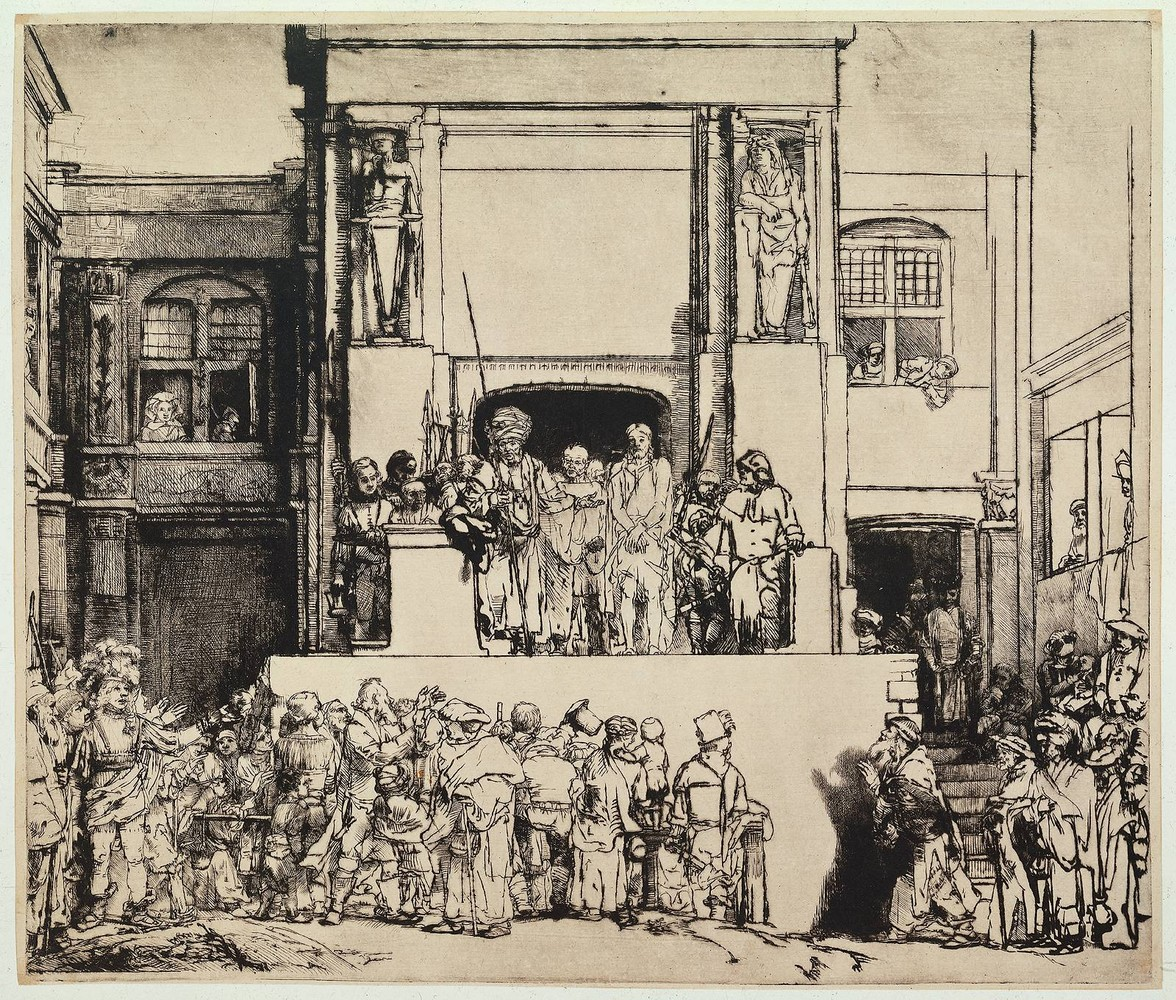
Version at the Rijksmuseum, Amsterdam (inv. RP-P-1975-1) (state iii)

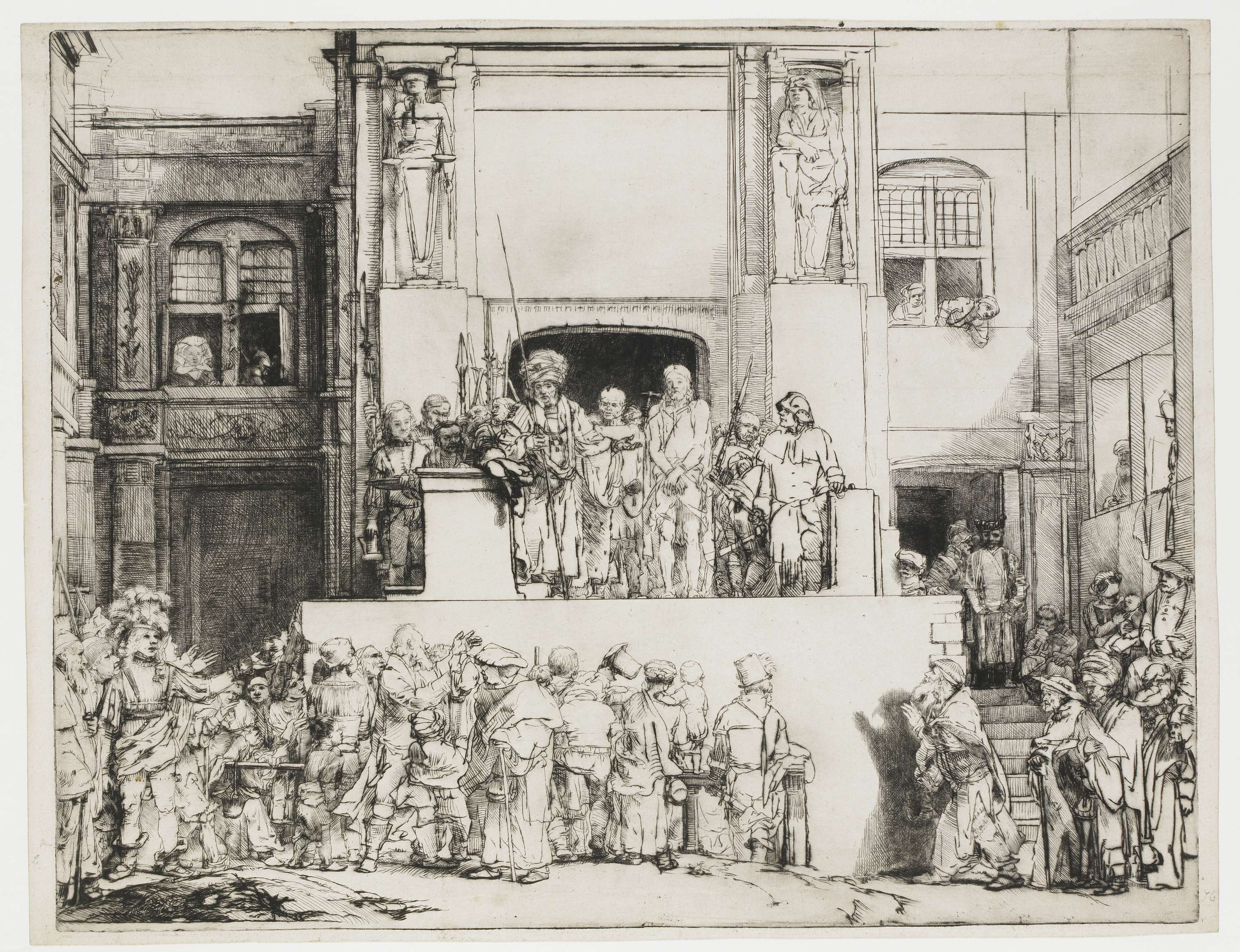
Version at the Rijksmuseum, Amsterdam (state v)

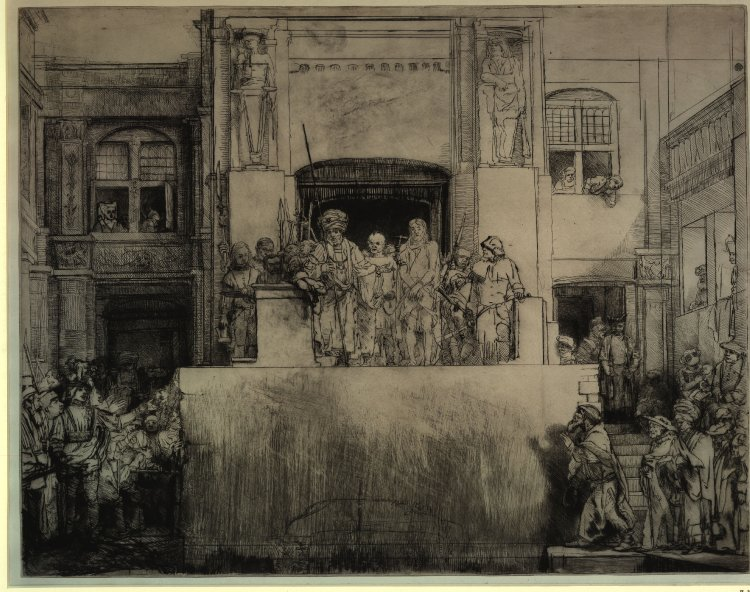
Version at the British Museum, London (state vi)

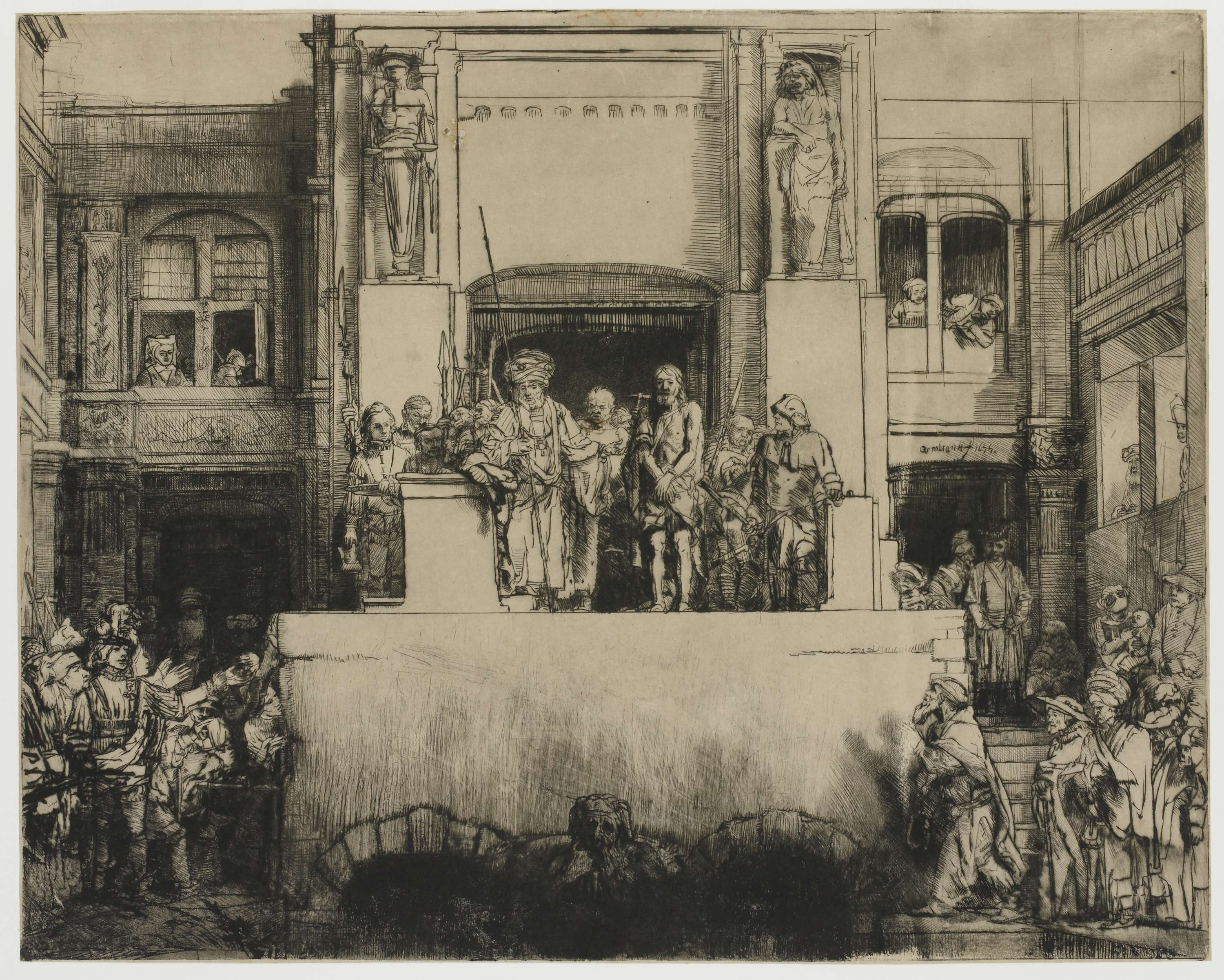
Version at the Rijksmuseum, Amsterdam (inv RP-P-1962-121) (state vii)

== See also ==
- List of drawings by Rembrandt
- List of etchings by Rembrandt
