= The Three Trees =

Print by Rembrandt

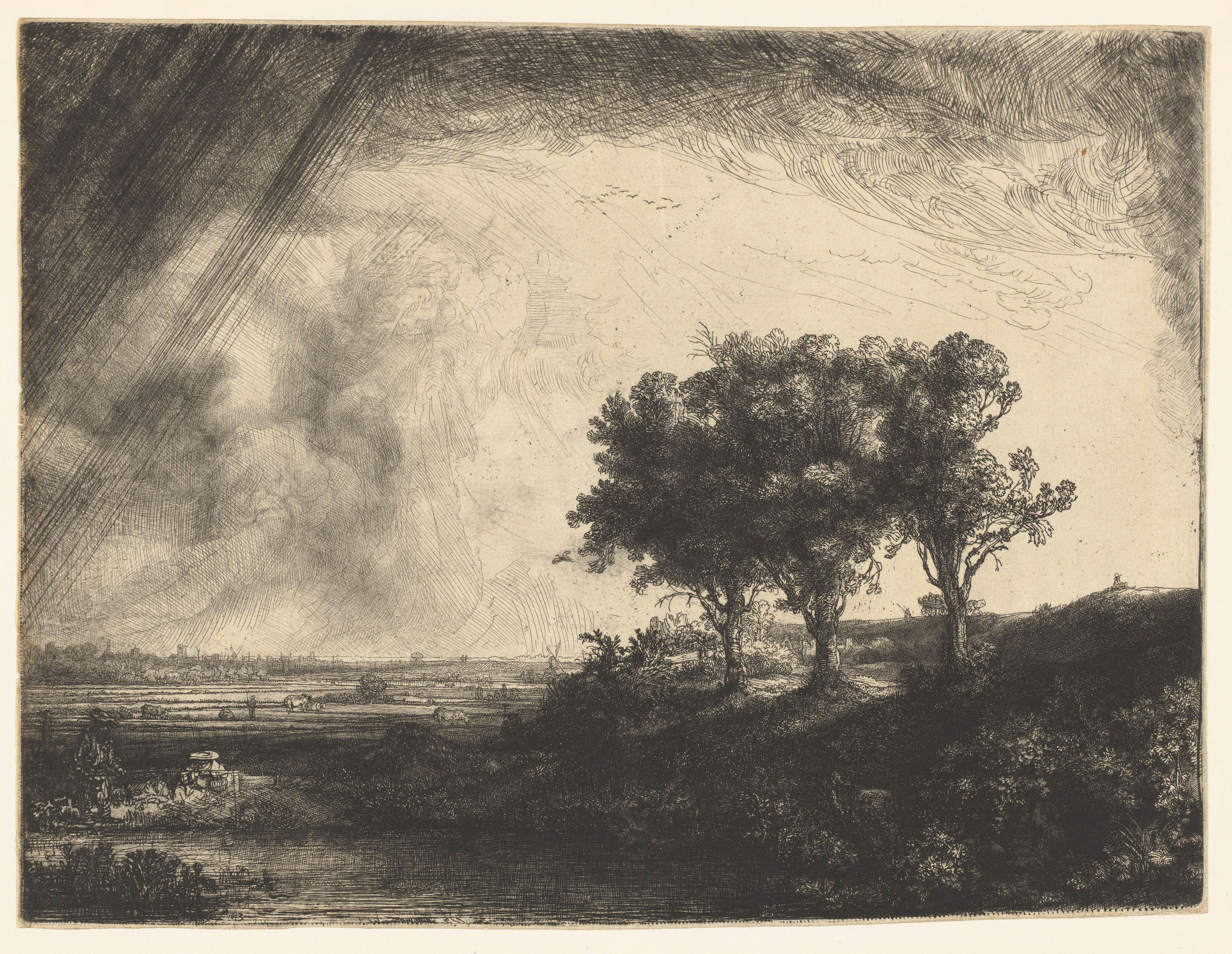
Artist / Rembrandt van Rijn; Title / The Three Trees; Date / 1643; Medium / etching print and drypoint print on paper (state i/i); Dimensions / height: 21.3 cm (8.3 in); width: 27.9 cm (10.9 in); Collection / Rijksmuseum

The Three Trees is a 1643 print in etching and drypoint by Rembrandt. The work is known for its dramatic contrasts of storm and sunlight as well as technical experimentation and composition. Scholars note that this is Rembrandt's most famous and largest landscape print. It was assigned the number B.212 by Adam von Bartsch and impressions of the work are in the Rijksmuseum, the National Gallery of Canada and the Bibliothèque nationale de France.

== Description ==
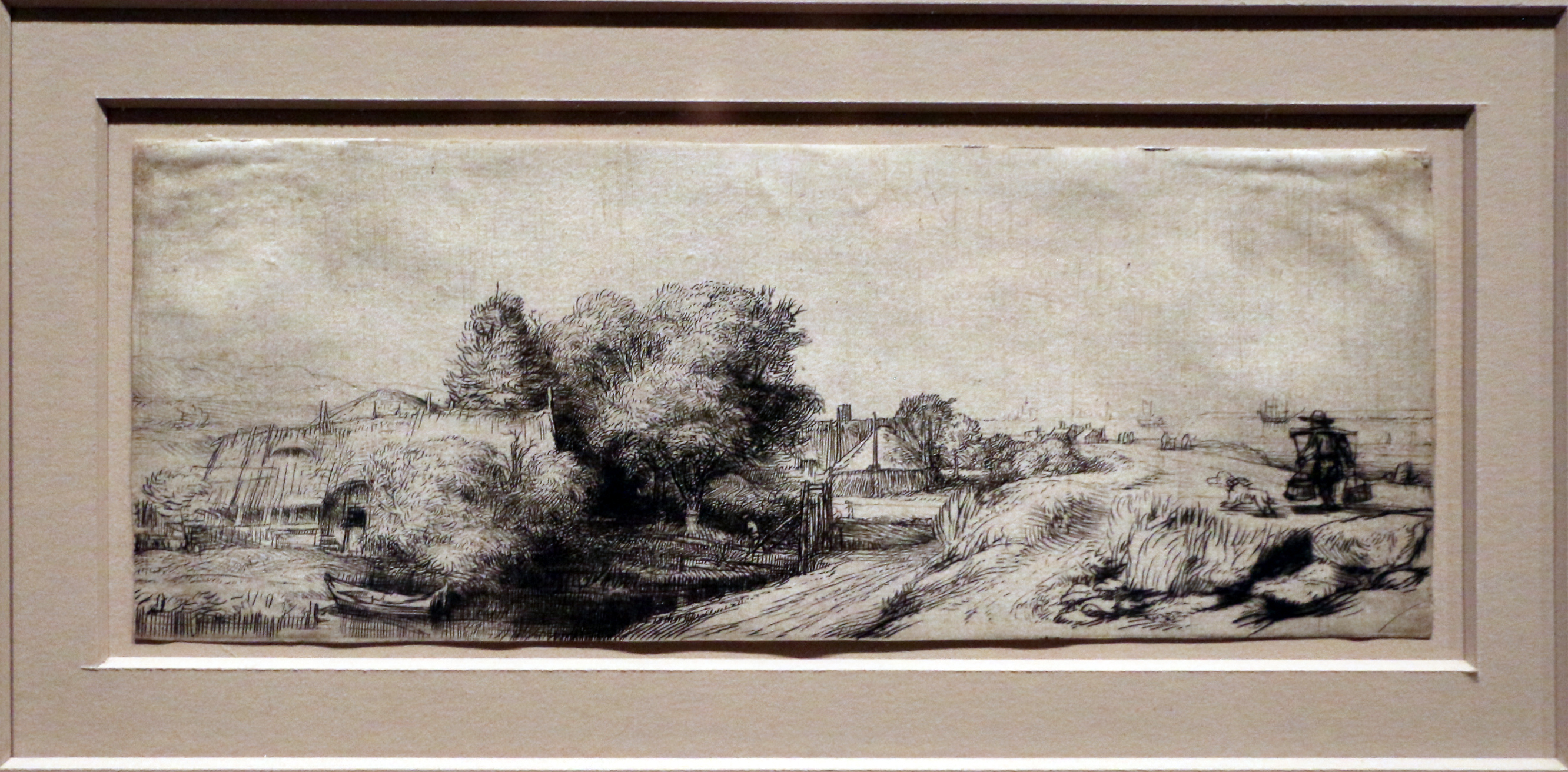
Rembrandt landscape representing Diemerdijk

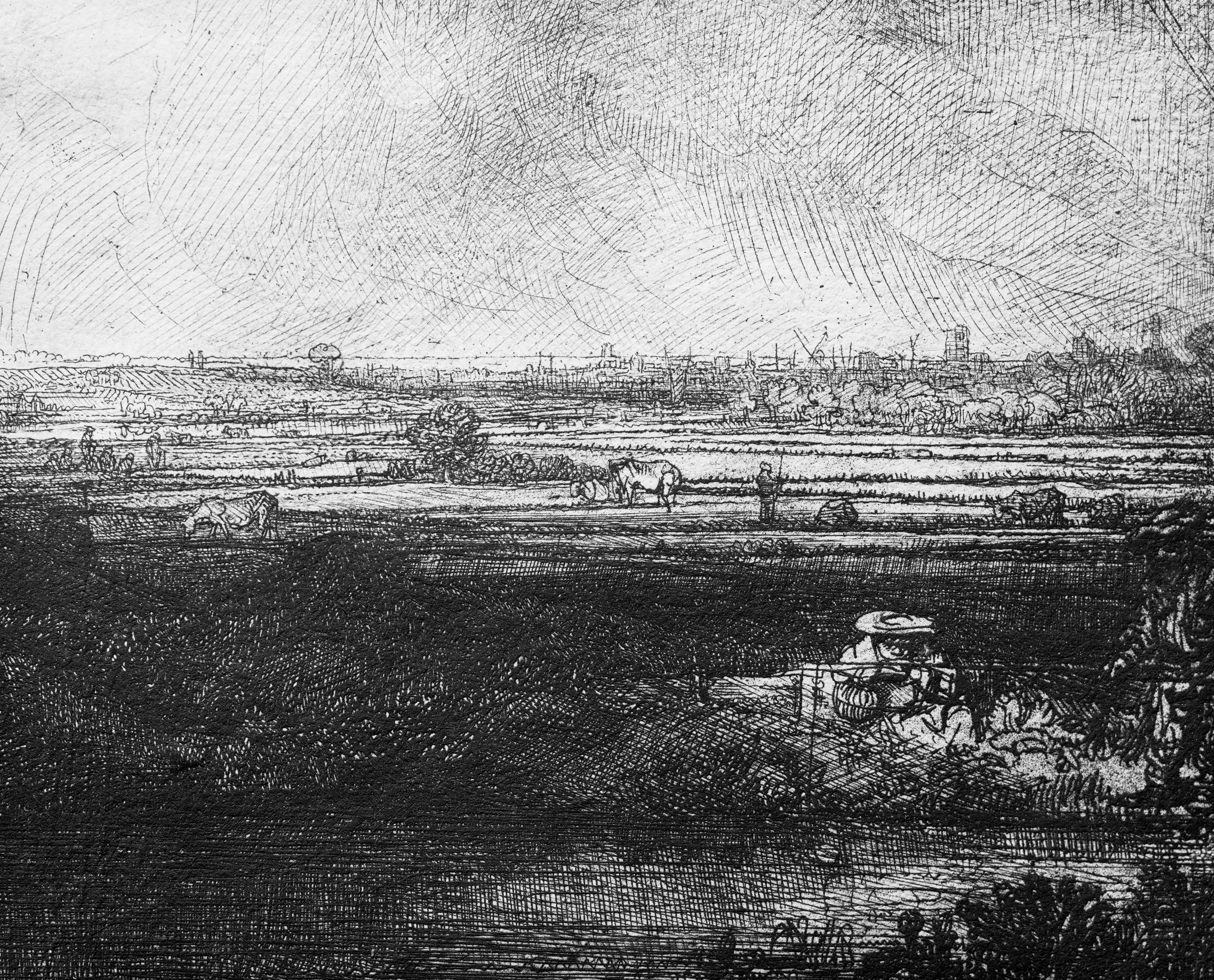
Detail of the bottom left corner of the etching showing the small figures and natural detail throughout the land of the etching

The print illustrates a dramatic landscape dominated by three trees set against a wide stretch of sky. There is a stark contrast between the darkened foreground and the brightly lit background, creating a prominent atmospheric effect. The scene appears naturalistic; however, scholars note that the print is not a precise topographical view but rather a freely composed landscape inspired by the countryside of Amsterdam. Scholars have been unable to identify recognizable details from the actual topography of Amsterdam, although efforts have been made to relate the picture to views of the city from the nearby areas of Diemerdijk and Haarlemmerdijk.

There is a wide range of human and natural detail throughout the print. Small figures, including peasants, a fisherman, and a pair of lovers, are integrated throughout the foliage and landscape in the bottom third of the etching. Scholars say these elements contribute to a pastoral tone that introduces subtle narrative and symbolic layers into the print.

== Composition and technique ==
Rembrandt's use of etching and drypoint in The Three Trees demonstrates technical experimentation throughout its making. Christopher White has noted that Rembrandt was "carried away by the temptation to bite" throughout the etching in the depiction of the dark shadows, the formless bank, as well as the fisherman's contour becoming less precise. The upper left corner includes areas of dense parallel hatching, which contrast with the open areas of the sky, allowing for a dramatic interaction between light and shadows.

The dense parallel hatching has led to scholarly debates over whether the marks represent rain or rays of sunlight, demonstrating the ambiguity of the weather conditions within the print. The presence of a storm would raise the question of why the farmers and herdsmen do not react. Christopher White has observed that it is one of the only Rembrandt landscape etchings from the period that includes a "positive rendering of the sky," meaning the sky is not simply blank space. Compared to Rembrandt's other etchings, some scholars argue there is a higher viewpoint creating a broader scene, while others say that the viewpoint is at eye level.

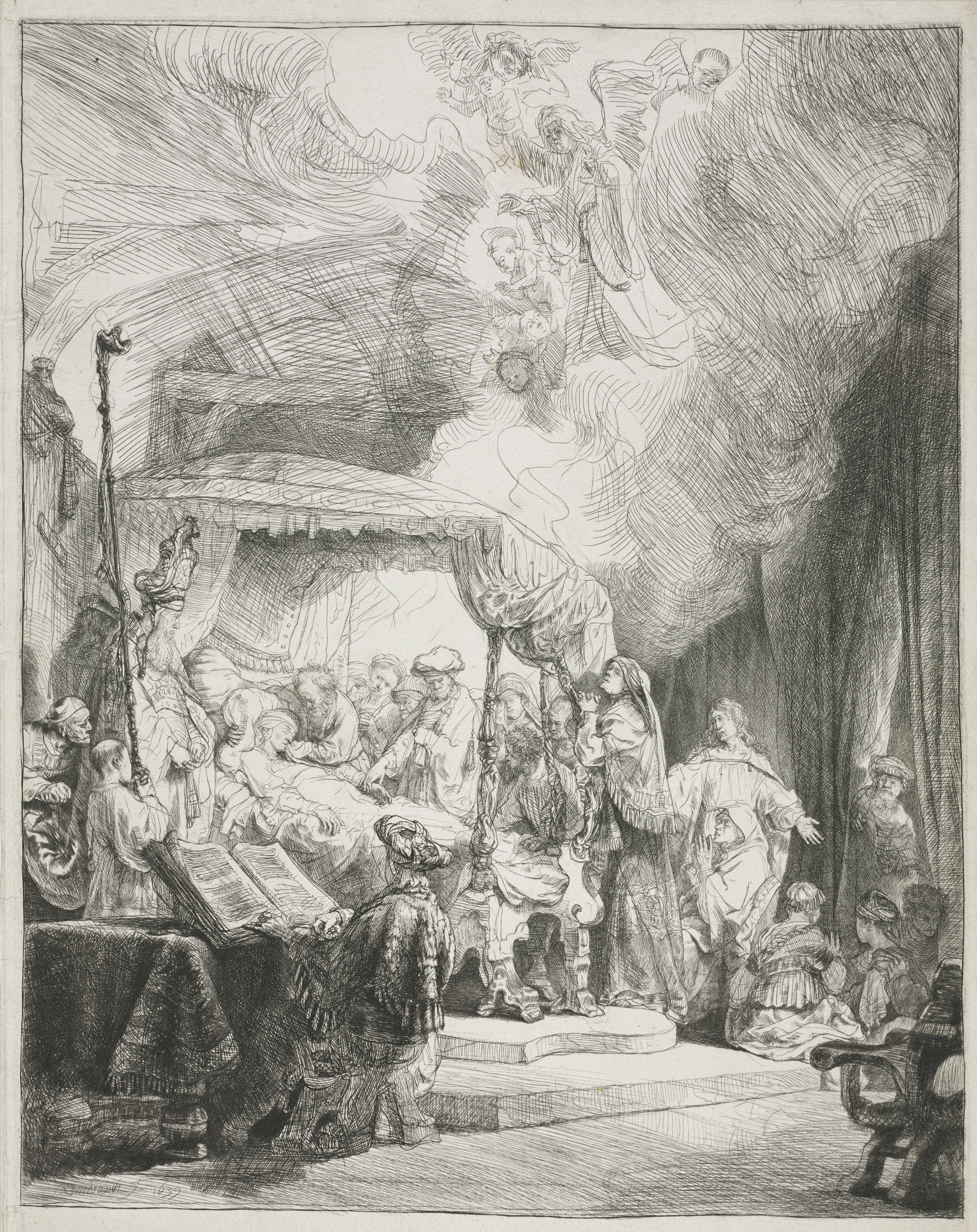
Rembrandt, Death of the Virgin, 1639

Marks in the cloudy portion of the sky indicate that Rembrandt may have previously etched elements of another scene on the same plate. He evidently polished out the scene from the plate after rejecting the idea, but left traces of it in the sky. Holm Bevers has identified the traces of an angelic aureola, turned sideways, behind the clouds, observing that they resemble the forms found in Rembrandt's 1639 etching Death of the Virgin.

== Interpretation and themes ==
Some scholars have detected erotic or romantic themes in the work. David R. Smith argues Rembrandt's etching mixes Dutch realism with pastoral romance to create a "metaphysical" dialectic between everyday life and poetic love. The inclusion of figures such as laborers and lovers creates this thematic contrast of reality and poetic ideals. The pair of lovers seen in the lower right is thought to be intensifying the pastoral and poetic characteristics of the scene.

Scholars have also searched for symbolic meaning in the natural elements of the landscape, such as the contrast between open and stormy skies, and the prominence of the three trees. Susan Kuretsky suggests that the trees allude to the Holy Trinity or three crosses, since in seventeenth-century Holland these "veiled meanings were... expected." Kuretsky further argues that the scene explores the relation between divine creation and human intervention. Elements within the etching, such as cultivated land and dikes, are able to coexist with more natural features, demonstrating how the Dutch atmosphere is shaped through both nature and human activity.

== Historical influence ==
The Three Trees reflect Dutch naturalism as well as European artistic traditions. Scholars have identified parallels with Claude Lorraine's idealized "heroic" landscapes, which have similar atmospheric effects. Marian Bisanz-Prakken questions whether Rembrandt's work was meant to stand in contrast to Lorraine's southern, idealized landscapes.

Scholars have also explored connections to literary pieces, including a parallel to the poetry of John Donne, specifically in its blending of physical reality and abstract themes, and in its exploration of love's place in the world.

== See also ==
- List of drawings by Rembrandt
- List of etchings by Rembrandt
