= ERV-Fc =

ERV-Fc was an endogenous retrovirus (ERV), or a genus or family of them, related to the modern murine leukemia virus. It was active and infectious among many species of mammals in several orders, jumping species more than 20 times between about 33 million and about 15 million years ago, in the Oligocene and early Miocene, in all large areas of the world except for Australia and Antarctica. After about 15 million years ago, it became extinct as an active infectious virus, perhaps due to its hosts developing inherited resistance to it, but inactive damaged copies and partial copies and fragments of its DNA survive as inclusions in the hereditary nuclear DNA of many species of mammals, some in different orders, including humans and other great apes. That has let interspecies jump routes of the spreading virus be tracked, and timed by the molecular clock in their extant descendants, but with gaps where trails were lost by passing through infected animals who left no extant descendants or by loss of the integrated sequence in some lineages.
