= The Three Crosses =

1653 etching and drypoint by Rembrandt

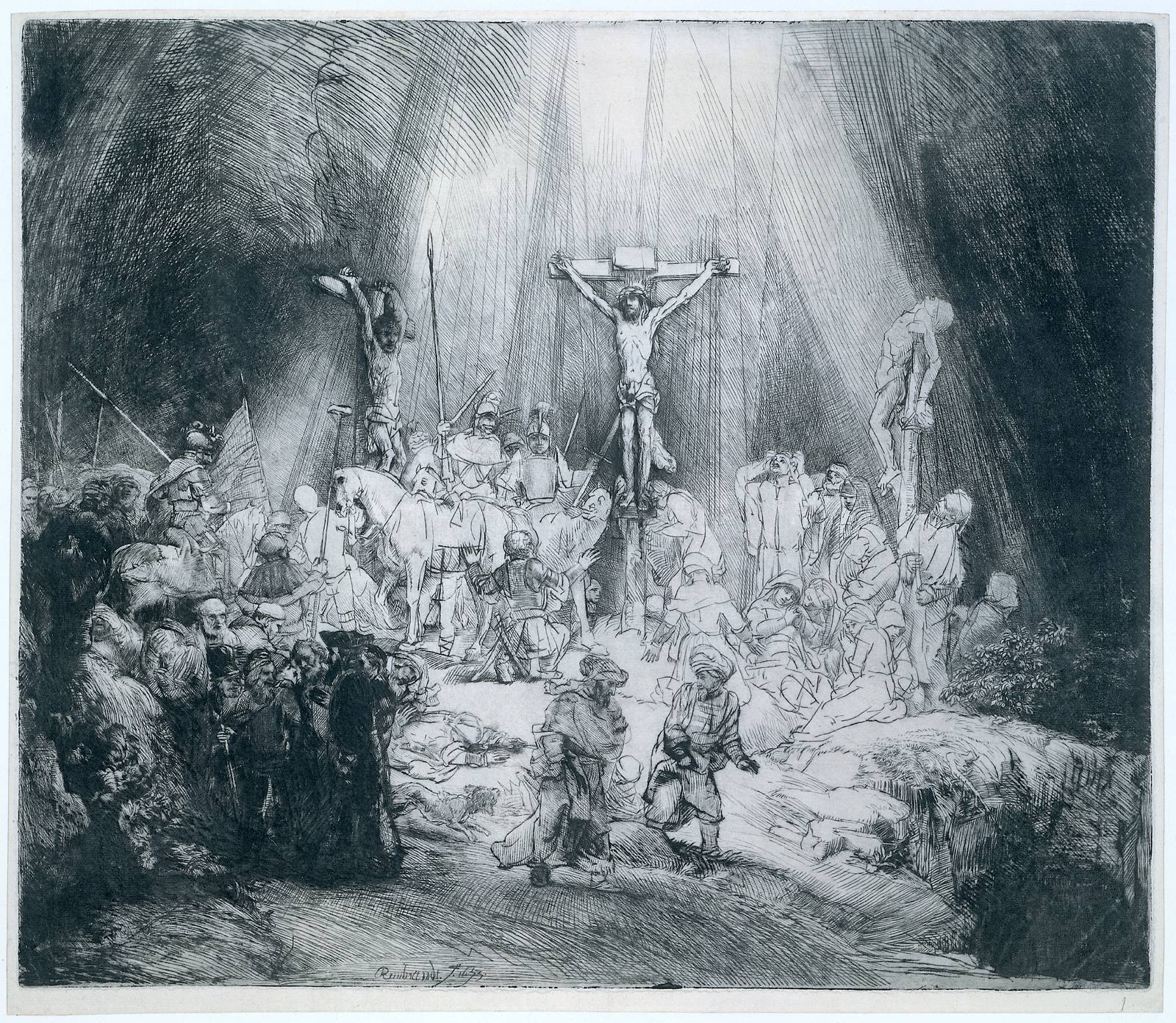
- Drypoint by Rembrandt, 1653
- Artist: Rembrandt van Rijn
- Year: 1653
- Medium: Etching and drypoint
- Dimensions: 394 mm × 456 mm (15.5 in × 18.0 in)
- Location: Museum of Fine Arts; Boston

The Three Crosses is a 1653 print in etching and drypoint by the Dutch artist Rembrandt van Rijn, which depicts the crucifixion of Jesus Christ. Most of his prints are mainly in etching and this one is a drypoint with burin adjustments from the third state onwards. It is considered "one of the most dynamic prints ever made".

The subject is Jesus Christ on the cross, flanked by the two thieves who were crucified with him, and the Virgin Mary, mother of Jesus, weeping and supported by the Evangelist. Roman soldiers on horseback, along with grieving citizens, surround the crosses. A beam of light, representing God's light from heaven, pierces the darkened sky to envelop the crucified figure of Christ.

The print is noted for its especially intricate iconography, and may represent the exact moment of Christ's death. According to Paul Crenshaw of the Kemper Art Museum, Rembrandt was inspired by the text from Matthew 27:46-54 when Christ cried out, "My God, my God, why hast Thou forsaken Me?" Rembrandt drew heavily on biblical sources in his work, as well as being influenced by other Baroque contemporaries. This is one of over 300 Bible-inspired works Rembrandt created.

The Three Crosses does not allow for dramatic contrasts of light and shade, known as chiaroscuro. Rembrandt produced the work in four stages, increasing the effects of the light and shade contrasts at each stage. Etching and drypoint are labor-intensive processes and one of the early forms of printmaking.

Rembrandt chose these media primarily because he often suffered financial hardship. He sold many of his etchings in order to be able to afford to print The Three Crosses. Rembrandt made around sixty impressions from the plate in its first three stages, the darkest shadows on the piece being done in dry point, and Christ and the lighter figures being etched. The nature of the media meant it was possible for Rembrandt to make continuous alterations (which he did over a ten-year period), adding further etching and dry point, changing the composition of the picture and making the final image darker and more chaotic.

In the last stage, the Virgin Mary becomes an almost disembodied head surrounded by darkness. The figures originally encircling her have been removed, as have been some of the soldiers on horseback. A man in a large hat (also on horseback) has been added and is believed to be a figure from Rembrandt's The Conspiracy of Claudius Civilis. The most dramatic alteration is to the "heavenly light" which has become considerably darkened, especially to the right of the picture. Rembrandt may have intended the contrast between the heavenly light and darkness surrounding it to distinguish the 'good' thief from the 'bad' thief.

Each progressive change in the work increases the focal importance of the Christ figure. In its fourth and fifth state, Rembrandt inked the plates in a different number of ways and with different qualities of ink. One of the prints in the fourth stage is located at the Kemper Art Museum.

== See also ==
- List of drawings by Rembrandt
- List of etchings by Rembrandt
