= Descent from the Cross by Torchlight =

Print by Rembrandt

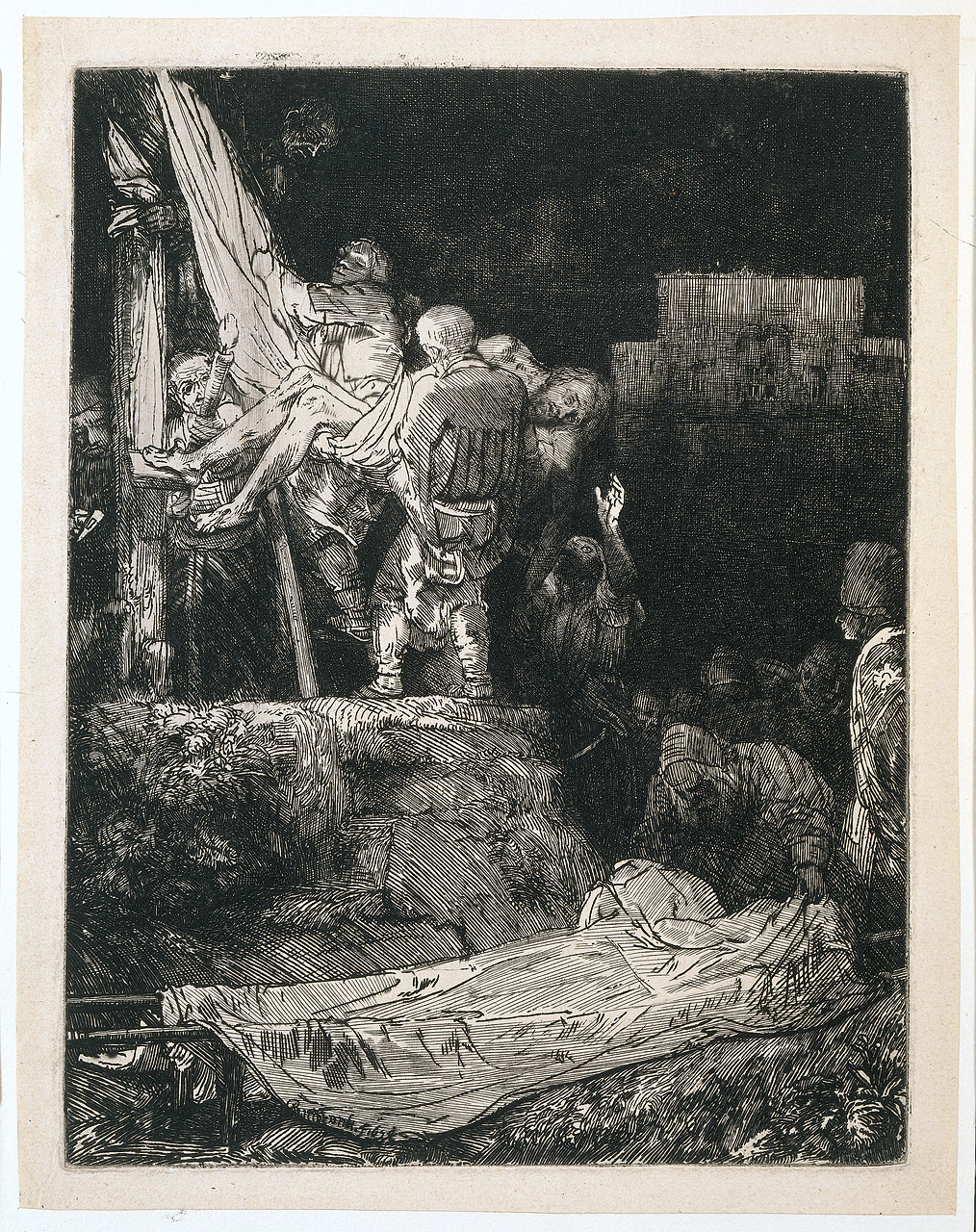
Descent from the Cross by Torchlight

Descent from the Cross by Torchlight is a print by Rembrandt in etching and drypoint, produced in 1652. Only one state of the work is known, with copies in major collections including the Rijksmuseum, British Museum, and Rembranthuis. It is signed and dated at the bottom right. It was assigned the number B. 83 by Adam von Bartsch. Some late impressions of the work are on Japanese paper, which Rembrandt used more and more from 1650 onwards. The depiction of the shadows on the plate was modified after the artist's death.

== See also ==
- List of drawings by Rembrandt
- List of etchings by Rembrandt
