= The State Bed =

Print by Rembrandt

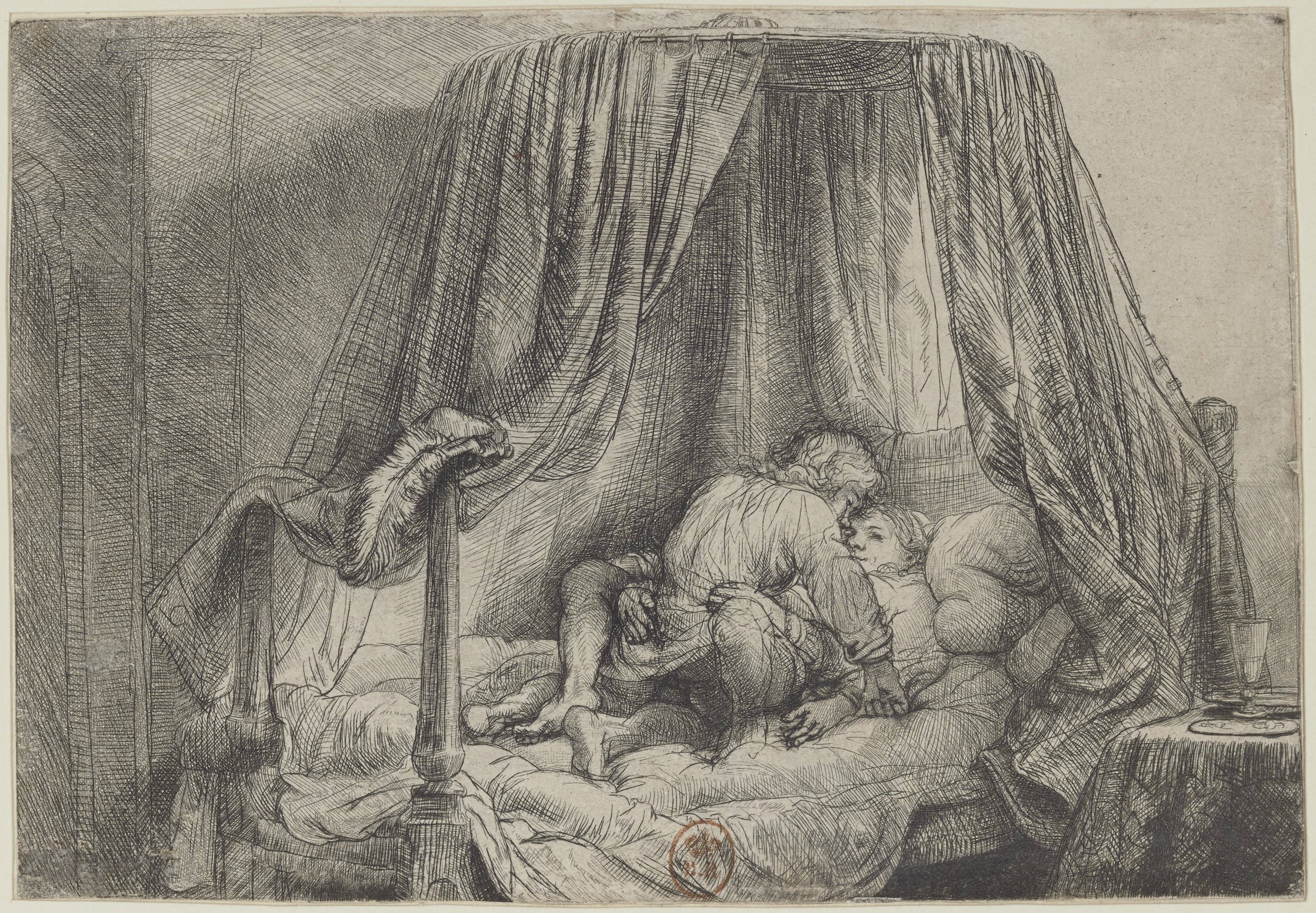

The State Bed (Dutch - Het Ledikant) is a 1646 print by Rembrandt in etching and drypoint. It is also known as Le Lit à la française (The French-style Bed), a title first given to it in Edme-François Gersaint's 1751 Catalogue raisonné de toutes les pièces qui forment l’œuvre de Rembrandt.

It shows a modern couple passionately making love in a four-poster bed, rather than disguising the work with a mythological title. This probably shocked the artist's contemporaries, since he cut his signature from off the printing plate, making impressions from it even rarer than usual. Impressions are held in the Rijksmuseum, the British Museum, the Morgan Library & Museum, and the Bibliothèque nationale de France.

== See also ==
- List of drawings by Rembrandt
- List of etchings by Rembrandt

== Sources ==
- The French bed, Rembrandt van Rijn, 1646
