= AKV =

AKV may refer to:

- Akulivik Airport (IATA abbreviation "AKV")
- AKV (virus), a murine leukemia virus
- A US Navy hull classification symbol: Aircraft transport ship (AKV)
