= The Death of the Virgin (Rembrandt) =

Drawing by Rembrandt

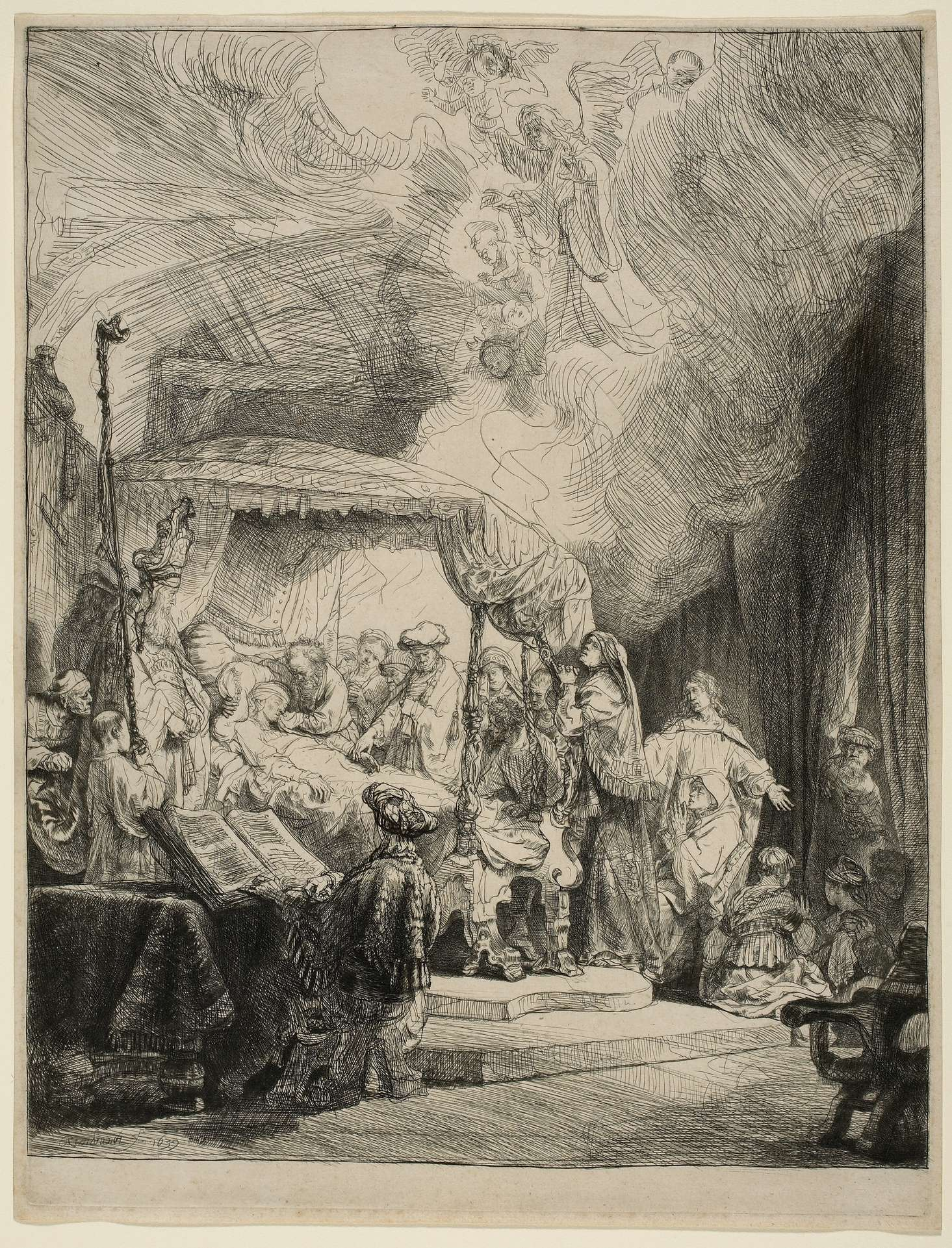

The Death of the Virgin is a 1639 print in etching and drypoint by Rembrandt, showing the death of the Virgin Mary from The Golden Legend.

== See also ==
- List of drawings by Rembrandt
- List of etchings by Rembrandt
