= Picovirinae =

Virus classification
- (unranked): Virus
- Realm: Duplodnaviria
- Kingdom: Heunggongvirae
- Phylum: Uroviricota
- Class: Caudoviricetes
- Order: Caudovirales (abolished 2021)
- Family: Salasmaviridae
- Subfamily: Picovirinae

Synonyms
- Nanovirinae

Subfamily of viruses

Picovirinae is a subfamily of viruses in the order Caudovirales, in the family Salasmaviridae. Bacteria serve as natural hosts. There are two genera and seven species in this subfamily.

== Taxonomy ==
The following genera and species are recognized:

- Beecentumtrevirus
  - Bacillus phage Nf
  - Bacillus virus B103
  - Bacillus virus Goe1
- Salasvirus
  - Bacillus virus Goe6
  - Bacillus virus Gxv1
  - Bacillus virus phi29
  - Bacillus virus PZA

== Structure ==
Viruses in Picovirinae are non-enveloped, with icosahedral or prolate heads of about 50–55 nm in diameter, and short tails. Genomes are linear, double stranded DNA, and are relatively small (between 16–20 kbp)-hence the term pico-virinae. Picoviruses package linear, monomeric genomes with a terminal protein covalently attached to each end.

== Life cycle ==
Viral replication is cytoplasmic. Entry into the host cell is achieved by adsorption into the host cell. Replication follows the DNA strand displacement model. DNA-templated transcription is the method of transcription. Bacteria serve as the natural host. Transmission routes are passive diffusion.
