= Abelson murine leukemia virus =

Virus classification
- (unranked): Virus
- Realm: Riboviria
- Kingdom: Pararnavirae
- Phylum: Artverviricota
- Class: Revtraviricetes
- Order: Ortervirales
- Family: Retroviridae
- Genus: Gammaretrovirus
- Species: Murine leukemia virus
- Virus: Abelson murine leukemia virus

Retrovirus

The Abelson murine leukemia virus (Ab-MLV or A-MuLV) is a retrovirus (Class VI) used to induce malignant transformation of murine lymphoid cells. As a retrovirus, it has a single-stranded, positive sense RNA genome which replicates via a DNA intermediate mediated by a reverse transcriptase. The Abelson murine leukemia virus is named for the American pediatrician Herbert T. Abelson, who together with Louise S Rabstein, first described and isolated it.

A-MuLV causes a rapidly progressive lymphosarcoma known as Abelson disease in mice, which is a type of leukemia that does not involve the thymus. However, this is only possible when the host cell is co-infected with a helper virus which provides functions it needs to be able to replicate which it does not code for in its own genome such as a reverse transcriptase and some major structural proteins. As such, A-MuLV can be described as a dependovirus. A highly efficient helper virus commonly used when growing A-MuLV in vitro is Moloney murine leukemia virus (M-MuLV). It causes leukemia directly by interfering with the normal growth and differentiation processes of lymphocytes. It can infect B-cells which was shown by the fact that some tumor cells can be seen to have immunoglobulins (Ig) on their surface although most tumor cells do not have characteristic receptors on their surface indicating that they are undifferentiated cells. In vitro studies have shown that lymphocyte infection produces tumor cell populations comprising three types of cells: stable productive cells, non-productive cells and cells which produced defective virus particles which are not infective.
