= Gammaretrovirus core encapsidation signal =

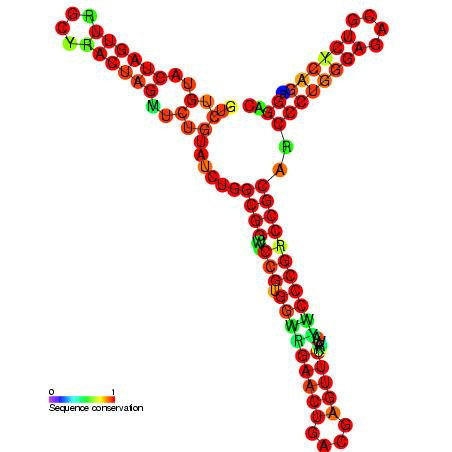
- Predicted secondary structure and sequence conservation of Gammaretro_CES

Identifiers
- Symbol: Gammaretro_CES
- Rfam: RF00374

Other data
- RNA type: Cis-reg
- Domain(s): Eukaryota; Viruses
- SO: SO:0000233
- PDB structures: PDBe

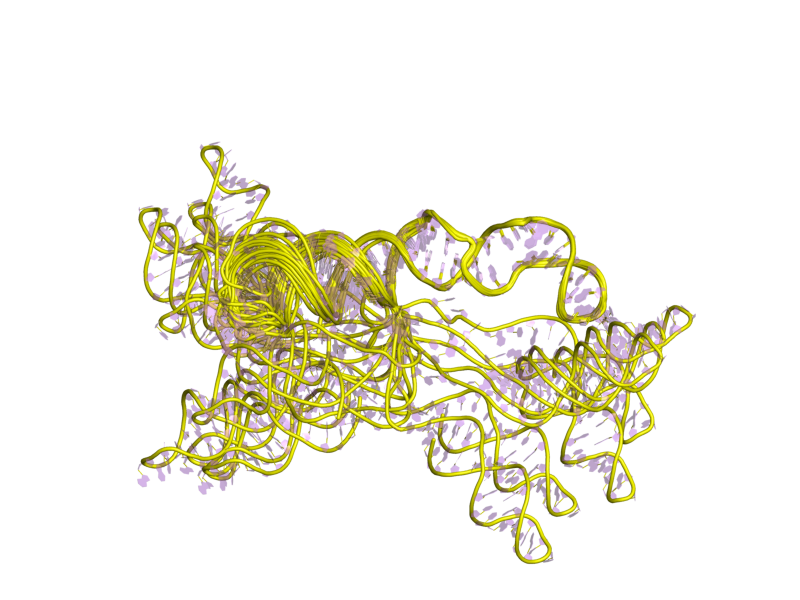
A 3D representation of a Gammaretrovirus core encapsidation signal. This is a view of the NMR structure for the 101-nucleotide core encapsidation signal of the Moloney murine leukemia virus.

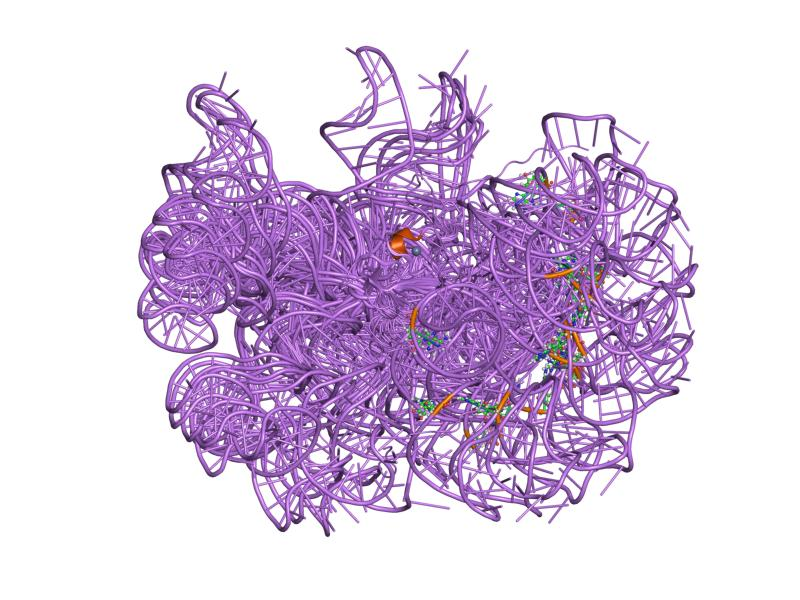
A 3D representation of a Gammaretrovirus. This structure shows the packaging of the dimeric genome of Moloney murine leukaemia virus, of which the encapsidation signal forms a part.

The Gammaretrovirus core encapsidation signal is an RNA element known to be essential for stable dimerisation and efficient genome packaging during virus assembly. Dimerisation of the viral RNA genomes is proposed to act as an RNA conformational switch which exposes conserved UCUG elements and enables efficient genome encapsidation. The structure of this element is composed of three stem-loops. Two of the stem-loops called SL-C and SL-D form a single co-axial extended helix.

== See also ==
- Bacteriophage pRNA
