= The Mill (Rembrandt print) =

1641 print by Rembrandt

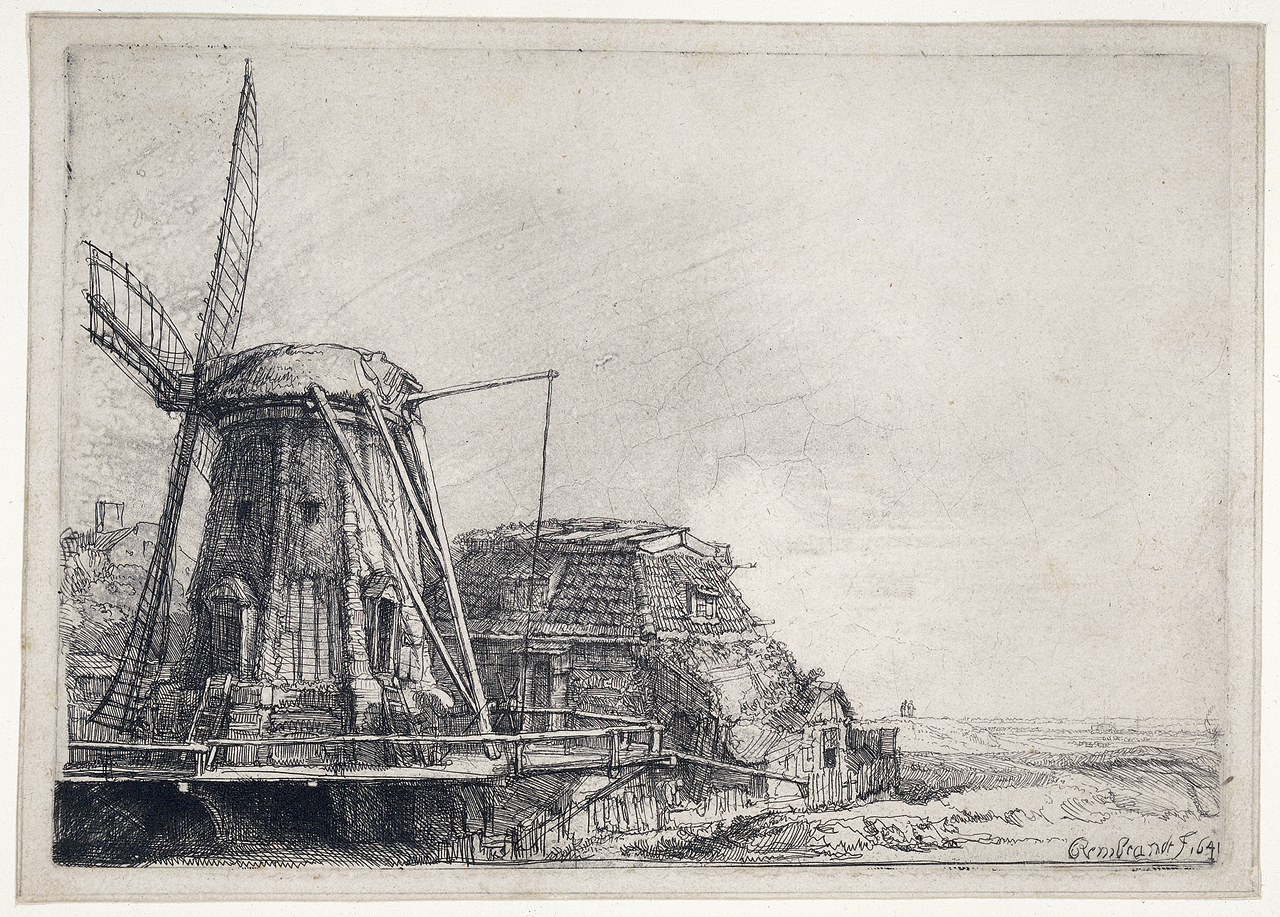

The Mill is a 1641 print by Rembrandt, only known in a single state. Copies of it are in the Rijksmuseum, the Metropolitan Museum of Art, and most large print rooms.

== See also ==
- List of drawings by Rembrandt
- List of etchings by Rembrandt
