= The Artist and his Model =

Print by Rembrandt

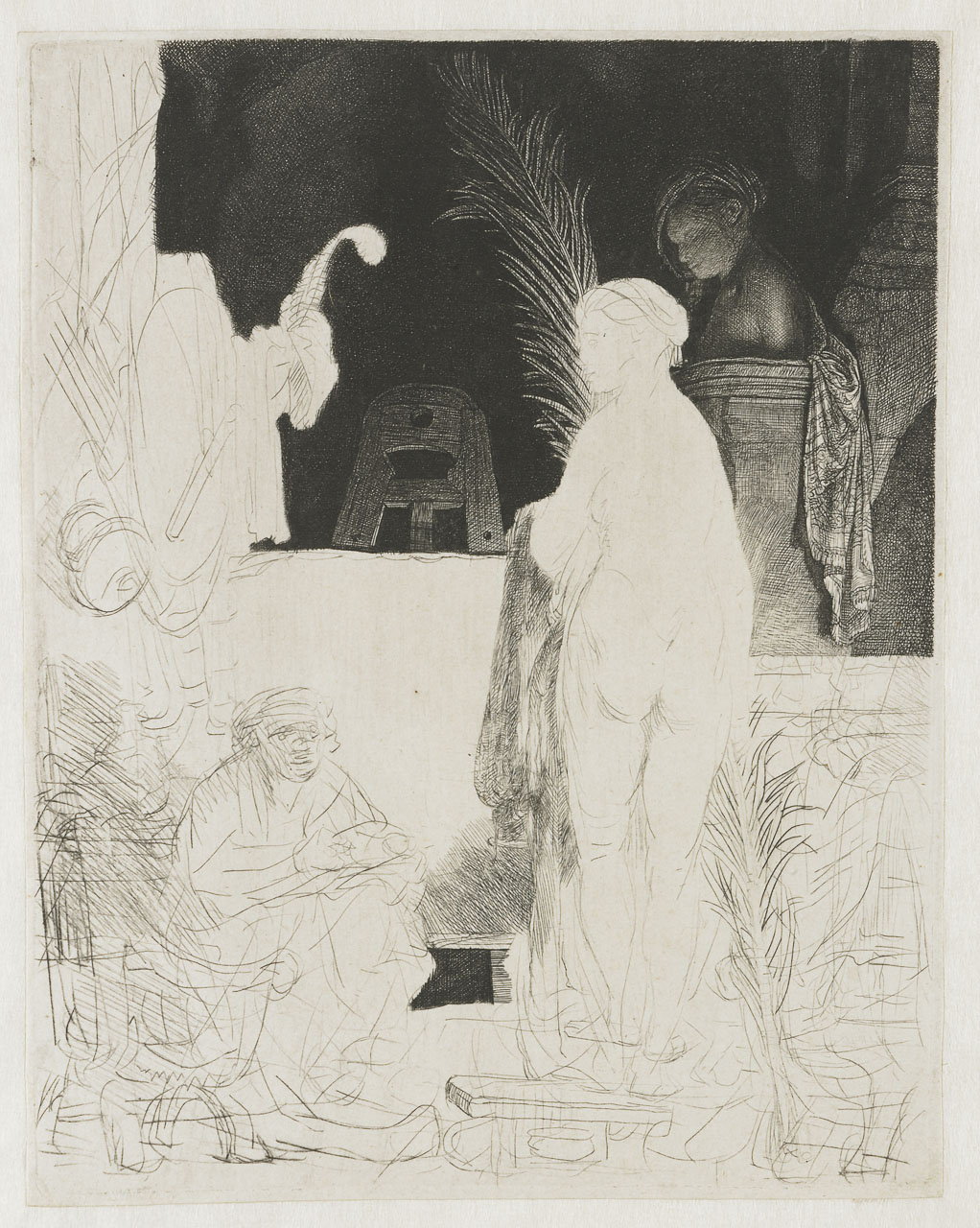

The Artist and his Model is a print by Rembrandt, known in two states, both incomplete. Copies of the work are in the British Museum, the Rijksmuseum, the Mikkel Museum, the Saint Louis Art Museum and many other collections. It was numbered B. 1921 by .

The first state was engraved around 1639—the composition has some similarities to a 1615 drawing by Pieter Feddes van Harlingen. Rembrandt began with the dark surfaces in the background and only sketched in the model. The second state was printed in 1640, with the arms and other details shown in more detail. Some argue that he abandoned the work, though Emmens instead argues that he produced it as a teaching aid for his students to show different stages in etching and engraving. The last impressions were made in 1652.

In the 19th century it was linked to the myth of Pygmalion, despite showing a man drawing not sculpting.

== See also ==
- List of drawings by Rembrandt
- List of etchings by Rembrandt
