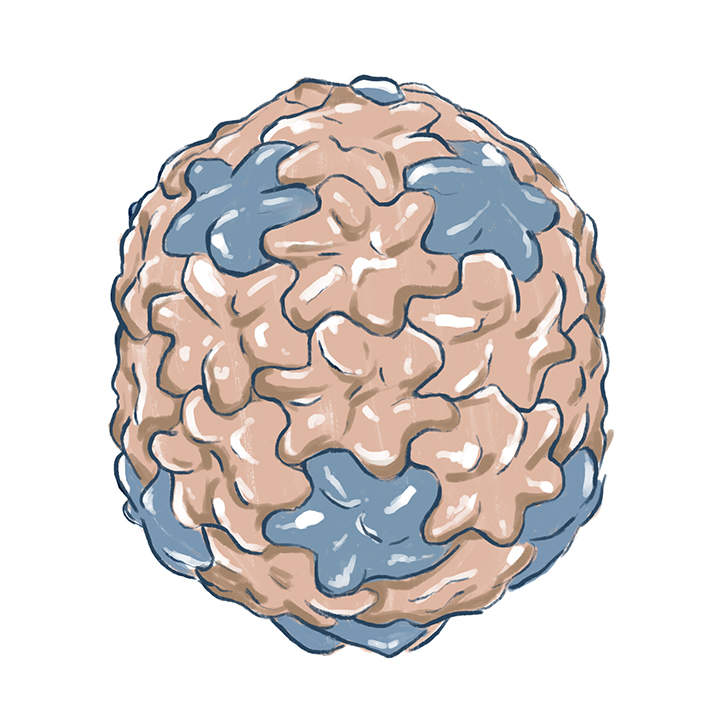
- An illustration of φ29's head based on electron microscopy data EMDB-2162

Virus classification
- (unranked): Virus
- Realm: Duplodnaviria
- Kingdom: Heunggongvirae
- Phylum: Uroviricota
- Class: Caudoviricetes
- Order: Caudovirales (abolished 2021)
- Family: Salasmaviridae
- Genus: Salasvirus
- Species: Bacillus virus φ29

= Bacillus virus phi29 =

Bacillus virus φ29

Species of virus

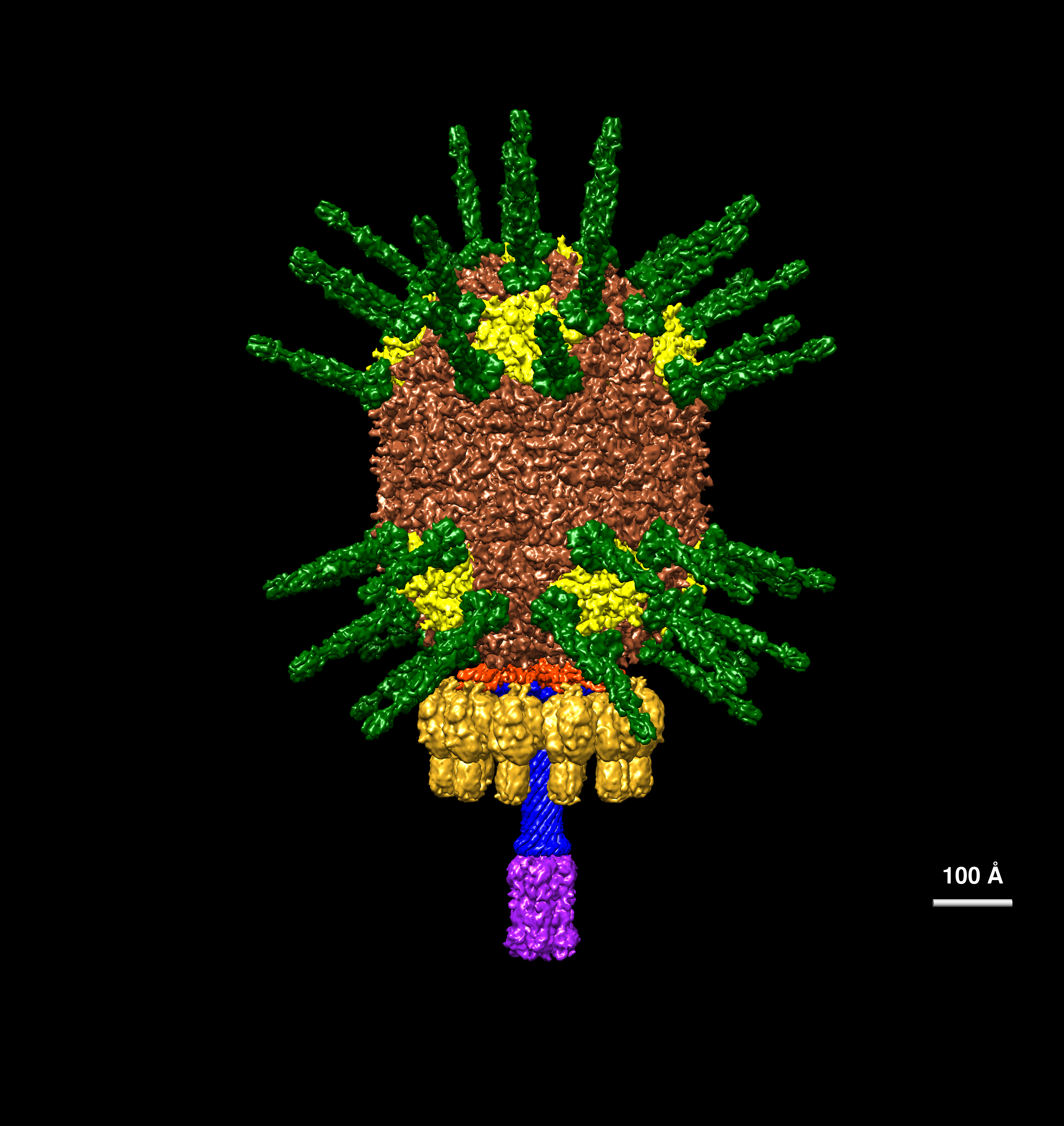
Bacteriophage φ29 structural model at atomic resolution

Bacillus virus φ29 (bacteriophage φ29) is a double-stranded DNA (dsDNA) bacteriophage with a prolate icosahedral head and a short tail that belongs to the genus Salasvirus, order Caudovirales, and family Salasmaviridae. They are in the same order as phages PZA, φ15, BS32, B103, M2Y (M2), Nf, and GA-1. First discovered in 1965, the φ29 phage is the smallest Bacillus phage isolated to date and is among the smallest known dsDNA phages.

φ29 has a unique DNA packaging motor structure that employs prohead packaging RNA (pRNA) to guide the translocation of the phage genome during replication. This novel structure system has inspired ongoing research in nanotechnology, drug delivery, and therapeutics.

In nature, the φ29 phage infects Bacillus subtilis, a species of gram-positive, endospore-forming bacteria that is found in soil, as well as the gastrointestinal tracts of various marine and terrestrial organisms, including human beings.

== History ==
In 1965, American microbiologist Dr. Bernard Reilly discovered the φ29 phage in Dr. John Spizizen's lab at the University of Minnesota. Due to its small size and complex morphology, it has become an ideal model for the study of many processes in molecular biology, such as morphogenesis, viral DNA packaging, viral replication, and transcription.

== Structure ==
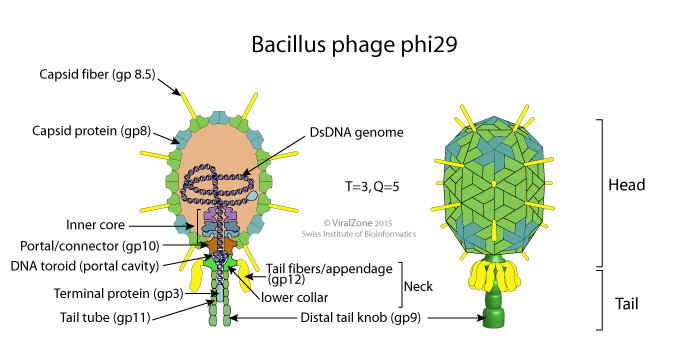
Schematic drawing of a φ29 phage virion (cross section and side view).

The structure of φ29 is composed of seven main proteins: the terminal protein (p3), the head or capsid protein (p8), the head or capsid fiber protein (p8.5), the distal tail knob (p9), the portal or connector protein (p10), the tail tube or lower collar proteins (p11), and the tail fibers or appendage proteins (p12*).

The main difference between φ29's structure and that of other phages is its use of pRNA in its DNA packaging motor.

=== DNA packaging motor ===
The φ29 DNA packaging motor packages the phage genome into the procapsid during viral replication. The φ29 packaging motor is structurally composed of the procapsid and the connector proteins, which interact with the pRNA, the packaging enzyme (gp16), and the packaging substrate (genomic DNA-gp3). Because the process of genome packaging is energy-intensive, it must be facilitated by an ATP-powered motor that converts chemical energy to mechanical energy through ATP hydrolysis. The φ29 packaging motor is able to generate approximately 57 piconewtons (pN) of force, making it one of the most powerful biomotors studied to date.

=== pRNA ===
The φ29 pRNA is a highly versatile molecule that can polymerize into dimers, trimers, tetramers, pentamers, and hexamers. Early studies such as Anderson (1990) and Trottier (1998) hypothesized that pRNA formed intermolecular hexamers, but these studies had a solely genetic basis rather than a microscopy based approach. In the year 2000, a study by Simpson et al. employed cryo-electron microscopy to determine that, in vivo, only a pentamer or smaller polymer could spatially fit in the virus. Ultimately, single isomorphous replacement with anomalous scattering (SIRAS) crystallography was used to determine that the in vivo structure is a tetramer ring. This discovery aligned with what was known about the structural geometry and necessary flexibility of the packaging motor's three-way junction. When pRNA is in this tetramer ring form, it works as a part of the DNA packaging motor to transport DNA molecules to their destination location within the prohead capsule. Specifically, the functional domains of pRNA bind to the gp16 packaging enzyme and the structural connector molecule to aid in the translocation of DNA through the prohead channel. After DNA packaging is complete, the pRNA dissociates and is degraded.

== Genome and replication ==
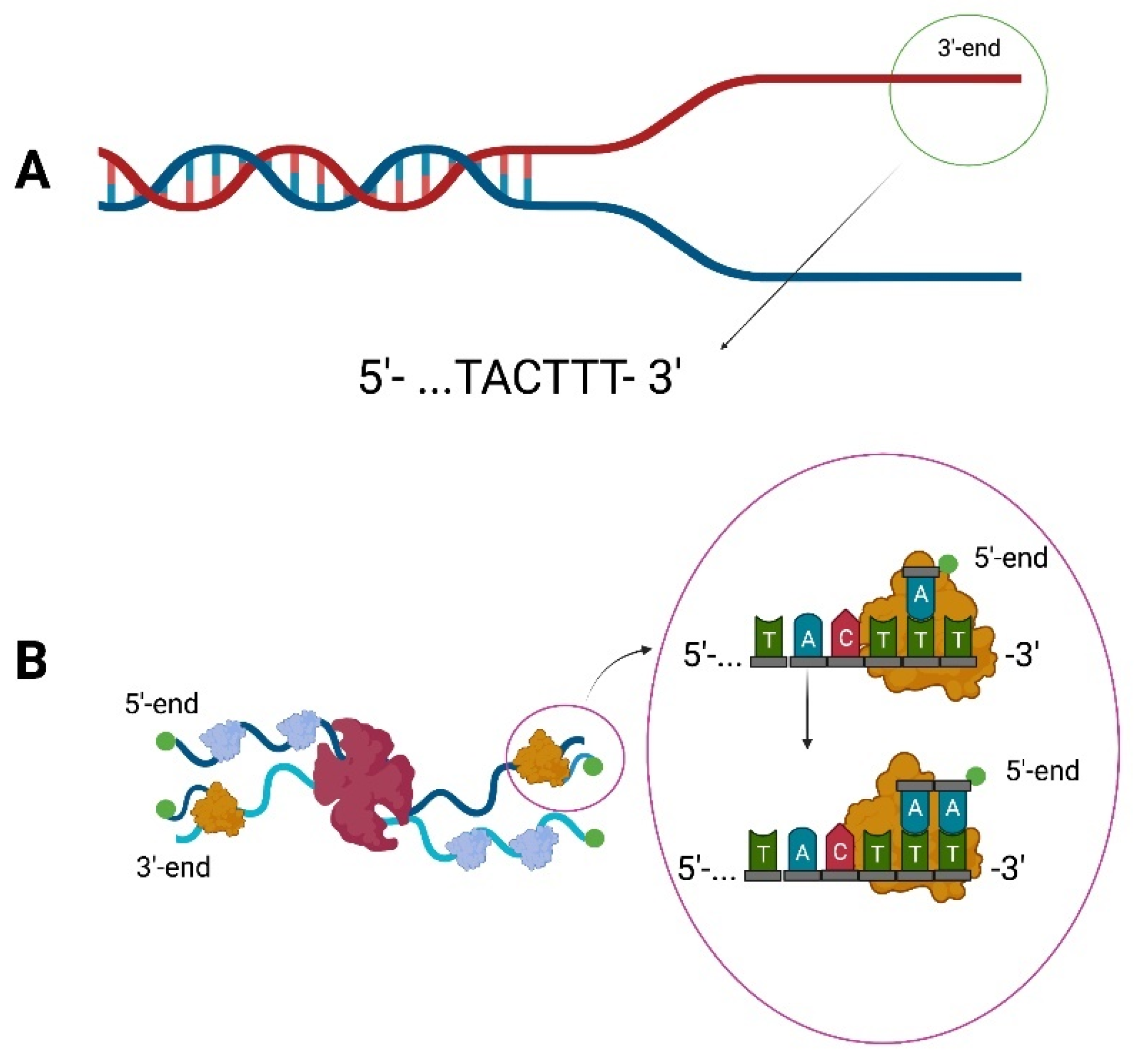
The replication mechanism of bacteriophage φ29

The φ29 phage has a linear dsDNA genome consisting of 19,285 bases. Both 5’ ends of the genome are capped with a covalently bonded terminal protein (p3) that complexes with DNA polymerase during replication.

φ29 is one of many phages with a DNA polymerase that has a different structure and function compared to standard DNA polymerases in other organisms. φ29 forms a replication complex involving the p3 terminal protein, the dAMP nucleotide, and its own DNA polymerase to synthesize DNA in a 5’ to 3’ direction. This replication process also employs a sliding-back mechanism towards the 3’ end of the genome that uses a repeating TTT motif to move the replication complex backward without altering the template sequence. This allows the initiation of DNA replication to be more accurate by having the polymerase complex check a specific sequence before beginning the elongation process.

== Applications ==
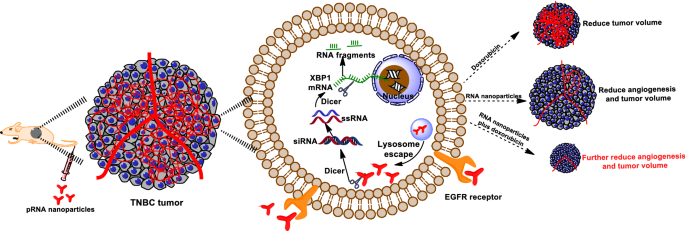
Targeting of TNBC molecules by bacteriophage φ29 pRNA

=== Nanoparticle assembly ===
Versatility in RNA structure and function provides the ability to assemble nanoparticles for nanomedicinal therapeutics. The pRNA in bacteriophage φ29 can use its three-way junction in order to self-assemble into nanoparticles.

One major challenge of using pRNA-derived nanoparticles is large-scale production, as most industries are currently unequipped to handle industrial pRNA synthesis. This is primarily because RNA nanotechnology is still an emerging field that lacks industrial application and manufacturing optimization of small RNAs.

=== Drug delivery ===
φ29’s DNA packaging system, using pRNA, incorporates a motor for the delivery of therapeutic molecules like ribozymes and aptamers. The small size of pRNA-derived nanoparticles also helps to deliver drugs in tight spaces like blood vessels.

The main difficulty in using aptamer-based drug delivery is sourcing unique aptamers and other multimers for specific treatments for diseases that potentially degrade therapeutic multimers and nanoparticles in vivo. Nanoparticles need to be stabilized as delivery mechanisms in order to adapt to microenvironments that may result in loss of therapeutic cargo.

=== Triple-negative breast cancer treatment ===
Triple-negative breast cancer (TNBC) is an aggressive form of breast cancer that accounts for ten to fifteen percent of all breast cancer cases. Chemotherapy is the only viable current treatment for TNBC because the loss of target receptors inherent to the disease causes cancer cells to resist therapeutic pharmaceuticals.

The three-way junction in the φ29 DNA packaging motor can help sensitize TNBC cells to chemotherapy using a siRNA drug delivery mechanism to inhibit TNBC growth and volume. This treatment can also be combined with anti-cancer drugs like Doxorubicin to enhance therapeutic effects.

== See also ==
- Bacteriophage
- Bacteriophage pRNA
- φ29 DNA polymerase
