= Doctor Fautrieus =

1652 etching by Rembrandt

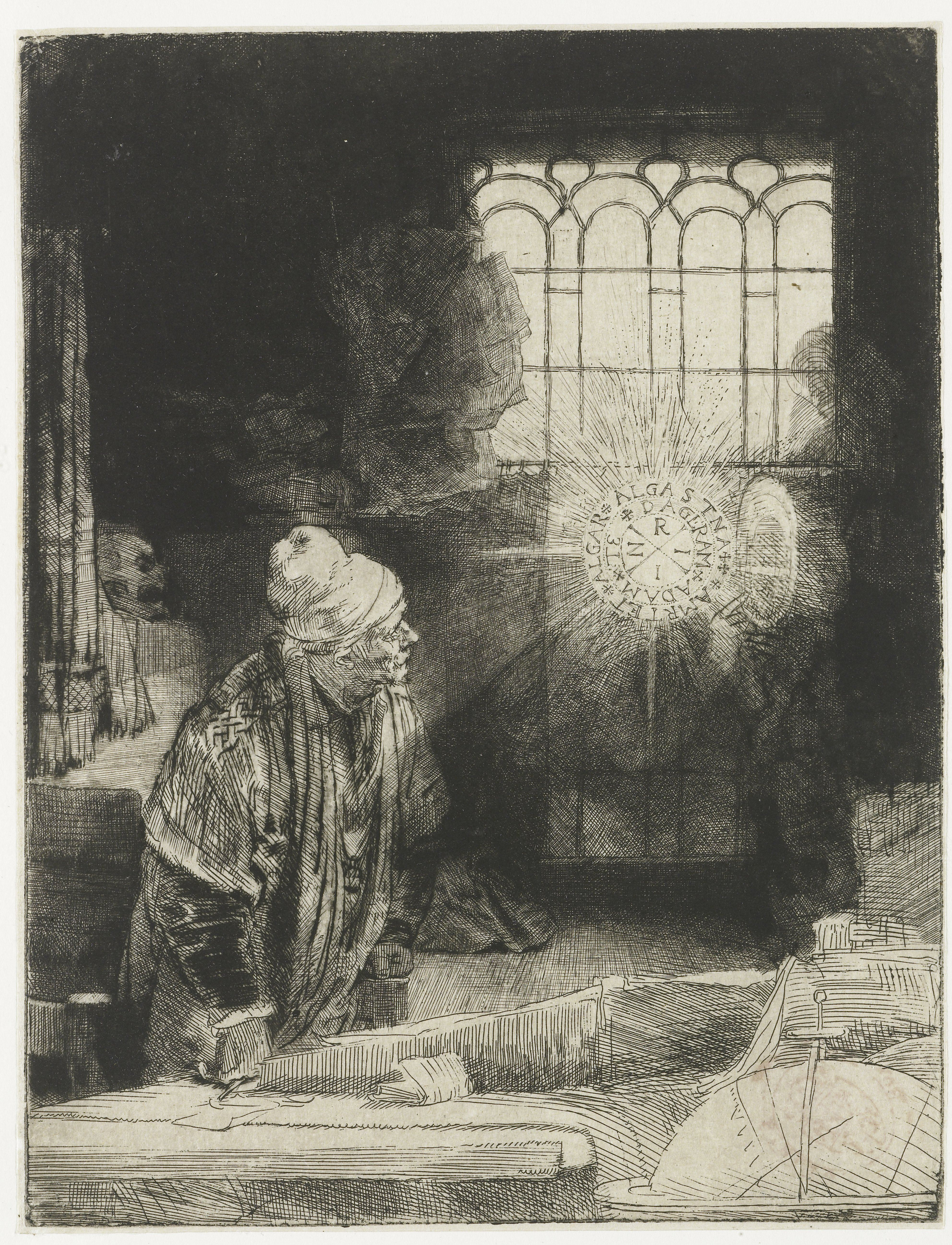

Doctor Fautrieus or The Alchemist at Home in his Study is a 1652 etching by Rembrandt, produced in four states and known as B. 2701. The prime state is in the Rijksmuseum in Amsterdam.

It is also known as Doctor Fautreius, the Dutch philosopher, the title under which it appeared in Charles Blanc's catalogue. Goethe used a reproduction of it in the 1790 edition of his Faust, meaning it has long been mistakenly known as Faust or Doctor Faust.

This etching inspired Victor Hugo for his 1831 novel The Hunchback of Notre-Dame, in which it is cited to describe Claude Frollo's workshop in chapter IV of the seventh book, entitled Ἀνάγκη.

== See also ==
- List of drawings by Rembrandt
- List of etchings by Rembrandt
