= Murine leukemia virus =

Virus classification
- (unranked): Virus
- Realm: Riboviria
- Kingdom: Pararnavirae
- Phylum: Artverviricota
- Class: Revtraviricetes
- Order: Ortervirales
- Family: Retroviridae
- Genus: Gammaretrovirus
- Species: Gammaretrovirus murleu

Species of virus

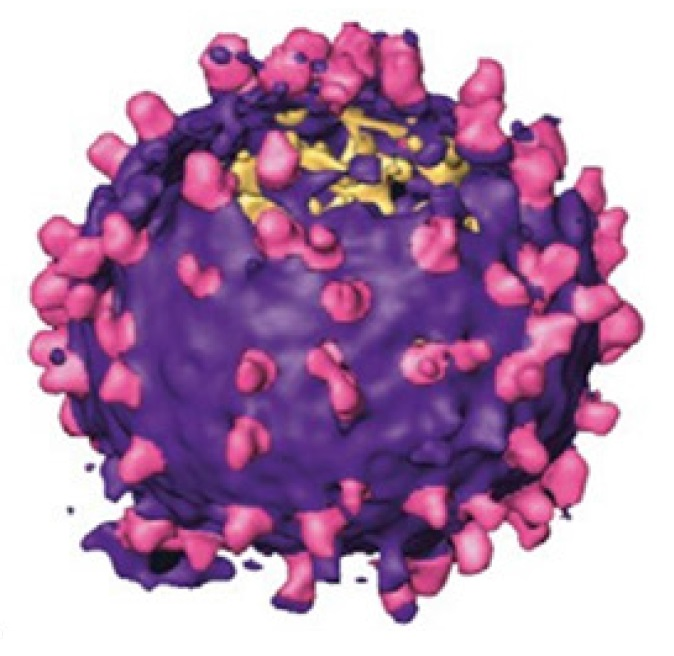

The murine leukemia viruses (MLVs or MuLVs) are retroviruses named for their ability to cause cancer in murine (mouse) hosts. Some MLVs may infect other vertebrates. MLVs include both exogenous and endogenous viruses. Replicating MLVs have a positive sense, single-stranded RNA (ssRNA) genome that replicates through a DNA intermediate via the process of reverse transcription.

== Classification ==
The murine leukemia viruses are group/type VI retroviruses belonging to the gammaretroviral genus of the Retroviridae family. The viral particles of replicating MLVs have C-type morphology as determined by electron microscopy.

The MLVs include both exogenous and endogenous viruses. Exogenous forms are transmitted as new infections from one host to another. The Moloney, Rauscher, Abelson and Friend MLVs, named for their discoverers, are used in cancer research.

Endogenous MLVs are integrated into the host's germ line and are passed from one generation to the next. Stoye and Coffin have classified them into four categories by host specificity, determined by the genomic sequence of their envelope region. The ecotropic MLVs (from Gr.eco, "Home") are capable of infecting mouse cells in culture. Non-ecotropic MLVs may be xenotropic (from xenos, "foreign", infecting non-mouse species), polytropic or modified polytropic (infecting a range of hosts including mice). Among the latter MLVs are amphotropic viruses (Gr. amphos, "both") that can infect both mouse cells and cells of other animal species. These terms and descriptions for the MLV biologic classification were initially introduced by Levy. Different strains of mice may have different numbers of endogenous retroviruses, and new viruses may arise as the result of recombination of endogenous sequences.

== Virion structure ==
As Type C retroviruses, replicating murine leukemia viruses produce a virion containing a spherical nucleocapsid (the viral genome in complex with viral proteins) surrounded by a lipid bilayer derived from the host cell membrane. The lipid bilayer contains integrated host and viral proteins studded with carbohydrate molecules. The viral particle is approximately 90 nanometres (nm) in diameter. The viral glycoproteins are expressed on the membrane as trimer of a precursor Env, which is cleaved into SU and TM by host furin or furin-like proprotein convertases. This cleavage is essential for the Env incorporation into virus particles.

== Genome ==
The genomes of exogenous and endogenous murine leukemia viruses have been fully sequenced. The viral genome is a single stranded, positive-sense RNA highly folded, molecule of around 8000 nucleotides. From 5' to 3' (typically displayed as "left" to "right"), the genome contains gag, pol, and env regions, coding for structural proteins, enzymes including the RNA-dependent DNA polymerase (reverse transcriptase), and coat proteins, respectively. In addition to these three polyproteins: Gag, Pol and Env, common to all retroviruses, MLV also produces the p50/p60 proteins issued from an alternative splicing of its genomic RNA.

The genome includes a conserved RNA structural element called a core encapsidation signal that directs packaging of RNA into the virion; the tertiary structure of this element has been solved using nuclear magnetic resonance spectroscopy.

== Replication cycle ==
Infection begins when the surface glycoprotein (SU) on the outer part of the mature, infectious virion binds to a receptor on the surface of the new host cell. For ecotropic murine leukemia viruses, this receptor is SLC7A1. As a result of attachment, changes occur in Env. These changes lead to the release of the surface glycoprotein (SU) and the conformational rearrangement of the transmembrane protein (TM). As a result, the fusion of the viral membrane and the plasma membrane occurs. Fusion of the membranes leads to the deposition of the virion content in the cytoplasm of the cell. After entering the cytoplasm, viral RNA is copied into a single dsDNA molecule by reverse transcriptase.

Gamma retroviruses can only infect proliferating cells, but recent research shows that MLV might be an exception. In mitotic cells, the viral accessory protein, p12, binds to a chromatin binding sequence allowing the pre-integration complex to "hitchhike" into the nucleus by tethering to mitotic chromosomes. Once in the nucleus, the integrase (IN) protein catalyzes its insertion into the host cell's DNA. The viral DNA integrated into the host genome is called "provirus". It is copied and translated by normal host-cell machinery to continue the viral life cycle. The encoded proteins are trafficked to the plasma membrane, where they assemble into progeny virus particles. Immature particles are released from the cell with the help of cellular "ESCRT" machinery and then they undergo maturation as the viral protease cleaves the polyproteins. The particle cannot start a new infection until maturation occurs.

== Viral evolution ==
As with other retroviruses, the MLVs replicate their genomes with relatively low fidelity. Thus, divergent viral sequences may be found in a single host organism. MLV reverse transcriptases are thought to have a slightly higher fidelity than the HIV-1 RT.

== Research ==
The Friend virus (FV) is a strain of murine leukemia virus. The Friend virus has been used for both immunotherapy and vaccines. Experiments have shown that it is possible to protect against Friend virus infection with several types of vaccines, including attenuated viruses, viral proteins, peptides, and recombinant vaccinia vectors expressing the Friend virus gene. In a study of vaccinated mice, it was possible to identify the immunological epitopes required for protection against the virus, thus determining the types of immunological responses necessary or required for protection against it. The research discovered protective epitopes that were localized to F-MuLV gag and env proteins. This was achieved using recombinant vaccinia viruses expressing the gag and env genes of FV.

== Application ==
- Gene therapy: MLV-derived particles can deliver therapeutic genes to target cells.
- Cancer studies: MLVs are used to study cancer development.
- As a model retrovirus in viral clearance studies
- Reverse transcriptase from MMLV is used in biotechnology
