= List of etchings by Rembrandt =

The following is a list of etchings by the Dutch painter and etcher Rembrandt, with the catalogue numbers of Adam Bartsch. Each change or addition to the plate that can be seen in a print is referred to as a 'state' of the print.

Image	Bartsch	States	Title	Year
	B059	1	The rest on the flight into Egypt	About 1626
	S398	2	The circumcision	About 1626
	B054	6	The flight into Egypt: a sketch	About 1627
	B352	2	The artist's mother: head only, full face	1628
	B354	2	The artist's mother: head and bust, three-quarters right	1628
	B004	1	Self-portrait with a broad nose	About 1628
	B005	3	Self portrait leaning forward: bust	About 1628
	B009	1	Self portrait, leaning forward, listening	About 1628
	B027	1	Self portrait bareheaded, with high curly hair: head and bust	About 1628
	B183	1	Beggar man and woman	About 1628
	B184	1	A stout man in a large cloak	About 1628
	B338	1	Self portrait bare-headed: bust, roughly etched	1629
	S376	1	A beggar in a tall hat and long cloak, with a cottage and two figures in the background	About 1629 or earlier
	B012	1	Self portrait in a fur cap, in an oval border	About 1629
	B095	1	Peter and John at the gate of the Temple: roughly etched	About 1629
	B106	1	St. Jerome kneeling: a large plate	About 1629
	B115	1	The small lion hunt: with two lions	About 1629
	B116	1	The small lion hunt: with one lion	About 1629
	B149	1	St. Paul in meditation	About 1629
	B153	5	The blindness of Tobit: a sketch	About 1629
	B162	1	Beggar in a high cap, standing and leaning on a stick	About 1629
	B166	5	Beggar with a crippled hand leaning on a stick	About 1629
	B182	1	Two studies of beggars	About 1629
	S399	1	Old man with snub nose	About 1629
	B327	3	Head of a man in a fur cap, crying out	About 1629-30
	B168	2	Old beggar woman with a gourd	About 1630
	B175	2	Seated beggar and his dog	1631
	B010	3	Self portrait, frowning: bust	1630
	B013	3	Self portrait open-mouthed, as if shouting: bust	1630
	B024	4	Self portrait in a fur cap: bust	1630
	B051	2	Simeon's hymn of praise [The presentation in the Temple with the angel: the small plate]	1630
	B066	3	Christ disputing with the doctors: small plate	1630
	B164	1	Beggar man and beggar woman conversing	1630
	B174	1	Beggar seated on a bank	1630
	B292	3	Bald-headed man in right profile [The artist's father?]	1630
	B294	1	Bald-headed man in right profile: small plate [The artist's father?]	1630
	B304	5	Man wearing a close cap: bust [The artist's father?]	1630
	B309	1	Old man with a flowing beard	1630
	B316	6	Self portrait in a cap, laughing	1630
	B320	1	Self portrait in a cap, with eyes wide open	1630
	B321	2	Bust of a man wearing a high cap, three-quarters right [The artist's father?]	1630
	B325	1	Bust of an old man with a flowing beard, the head bowed forward, the left shoulder unshaded	1630
	B001	2	Self portrait with curly hair and white collar	About 1630
	B048	1	The circumcision: small plate	About 1630
	B151	3	Man in a coat and fur cap leaning against a bank	About 1630
	B160	1	Old man in a long cloak sitting in an armchair	About 1630
	B163	1	Beggar leaning on a stick, facing left	About 1630
	B165	9	Beggar man and woman behind a bank	About 1630
	B172	6	Ragged peasant with his hands behind him, holding a stick	About 1630
	B173	2	Beggar seated warming his hands at a chafing dish	About 1630
	B179	2	Beggar with a wooden leg	About 1630
	B314	2	Bearded old man with a high forehead	About 1630
	B357	2	The white negress	About 1630
	B374	1	Three studies of old men's heads	About 1630
	B015	5	Self portrait in a cloak with a falling collar: bust	1630-1631
	B366	1	Sheet of studies of men's heads	About 1630-31
	B007	11	Self portrait in a soft hat and embroidered cloak	1631
	B016	1	Self portrait in a heavy fur cap: bust	1631
	B134	3	Old woman seated in a cottage with a string of onions on the wall	1631
	B135	5	Peasant with his hands behind his back	1631
	B138	3	The blind fiddler	1631
	B142	1	A polander standing with his stick: right profile	1631
	B150	4	Beggar with his left hand extended	1631
	B171	7	The leper [“Lazarus clep”]	1631
	B190	1	A man making water	1631
	B191	1	A woman making water	1631
	B260	3	Bust of an old bearded man, looking down, three-quarters right	1631
	B263	4	Bearded man, in a furred oriental cap and robe [The artist's father?]	1631
	B315	2	Old man with a flowing beard: bust	1631
	B348	3	The artist's mother seated, in an oriental headdress: half-length	1631
	B349	2	The artist's mother with her hand on her chest: small bust	1631
	B355	7	Bust of an old woman in a furred cloak and heavy headdress	1631
	B008	6	Self portrait with long bushy hair: head only	About 1631
	B140	1	The barrel-organ player [Polander standing with arms folded]	About 1631
	B154	2	Two beggars tramping towards the right	About 1631
	B198	2	Naked woman seated on a mound	About 1631
	B201	1	Diana at the bath	About 1631
	B204	2	Jupiter and Antiope: the smaller plate	About 1631
	B291	1	Bust of an old man with flowing beard and white sleeve	About 1631
	B302	5	Head of a man in a high cap	About 1631
	B312	2	Bust of an old man with a fur cap and flowing beard, nearly full face, eyes direct	About 1631
	B319	6	Self portrait with cap pulled forward	About 1631
	B343	3	The artist's mother seated at a table, looking right: three-quarter length	About 1631
	B101	3	St. Jerome praying: arched print	1632
	B121	3	The rat-poison peddler [The rat catcher]	1632
	B152	1	The Persian	1632
	B073	10	The raising of Lazarus: the larger plate	About 1632
	B062	1	The holy family	About 1632
	B117	2	A cavalry fight	About 1632
	B139	1	Turbaned soldier on horseback	About 1632
	B141	6	Polander leaning on a stick	About 1632
	B262	3	Old man with beard, fur cap and velvet cloak	About 1632
	B363	2	Sheet of studies: head of the artist, a beggar couple, heads of an old man and woman, etc.	About 1632
	B017	2	Self portrait in a cap and scarf with the face dark: bust	1633
	B052	2	The flight into Egypt: the small plate	1633
	B081	5	The descent from the cross: the second plate	1633
	B090	4	The good Samaritan	1633
	B111	2	The ship of fortune	1633
	B266	2	Jan Cornelis Sylvius, preacher [1564-1638]	1633
	B351	2	The artist's mother in a cloth headdress, looking down: head only	1633
	B038	2	Joseph's coat brought to Jacob	About 1633
	B018	2	Self portrait with raised sabre	1634
	B023	3	Self portrait [?] with plumed cap and lowered sabre	1634
	B039	2	Joseph and Potiphar's Wife	1634
	B044	3	The angel appearing to the shepherds	1634
	B071	2	Christ and the woman of Samaria: among ruins	1634
	B088	1	Christ at Emmaus: the smaller plate	1634
	B100	1	St. Jerome reading	1634
	B177	1	A peasant calling out ‘Tis vinnich kout’	1634
	B178	1	A peasant replying ‘Dats niet’	1634
	B345	3	Woman reading	1634
	B347	1	Saskia with pearls in her hair	1634
	B002	1	Self portrait wearing a soft cap: full face, head only	About 1634
	B144	1	Two tramps, a man and a woman	About 1634
	B069	2	Christ driving the moneychangers from the Temple	1635
	B097	2	The stoning of St.Stephen	1635
	B102	1	St. Jerome kneeling in prayer, looking down	1635
	B124	3	The pancake woman	1635
	B129	1	The quacksalver	1635
	B279	6	Jan Uytenbogaert, preacher of the Remonstrants [1557-1644]	1635
	B286	2	The first oriental head	1635
	B287	1	The second oriental head	About 1635
	B288	1	The third oriental head	1635
	B289	1	The fourth oriental head	About 1635
	B340	5	The great Jewish bride	1635
	B068	2	The tribute money	About 1635
	B080	1	The crucifixion: small plate	About 1635
	B119	2	The strolling musicians	About 1635
	B290	1	Old bearded man in a high fur cap, with eyes closed	About 1635
	B306	1	Bald old man with a short beard, in right profile	About 1635
	B019	3	Self portrait with Saskia	1636
	B077	5	Christ before Pilate: larger plate	1636
	B091	1	The return of the prodigal son	1636
	B269	3	Samuel Menasseh ben Israel [1604-57]	1636
	B365	1	Studies of the head of Saskia and others	1636
	B350	1	Old woman sleeping	About 1633-39
	B030	1	Abraham casting out Hagar and Ishmael	1637
	B268	2	Young man in a velvet cap [Petrus Sylvius, preacher?; 1610-53]	1637
	B313	1	Bearded man in a velvet cap with a jewel clasp	1637
	B368	1	Three heads of women, one asleep	1637
	B033	2	Abraham caressing Isaac	About 1637
	B367	3	Three heads of women, one lightly etched	About 1637
	B020	1	Self portrait in a velvet cap with plume	1638
	B028	2	Adam and Eva	1638
	B037	3	Joseph telling his dreams	1638
	B311	1	Man in a broad-brimmed hat	1638
	B342	1	The little Jewish bride [Saskia as St. Catherine]	1638
	B021	2	Self portrait leaning on a stone sill	1639
	B099	3	The Death of the Virgin	1639
	B109	1	Death appearing to a wedded couple from an open grave	1639
	B133	1	A peasant in a high cap, standing leaning on a stick	1639
	B281	2	Jan Uytenbogaert, [1606-84; ‘The goldweigher’]	1639
	B049	3	Simeon's hymn of praise [The presentation in the Temple: oblong print]	About 1639
	B156	1	The skater	About 1639
	B192	2	The artist drawing from the model	About 1639
	B259	1	Old man shading his eyes with his hand	About 1639
	B092	2	The beheading of John the Baptist	1640
	B265	2	Old man with a divided fur cap	1640
	B158	3	Sleeping puppy	About 1640
	B207	1	Small gray landscape: a house and trees beside a pool	About 1640
	B210	1	View of Amsterdam from the northwest	About 1640
	B372	1	Sheet with two studies: a tree, and the upper part of a head of the artist wearing a velvet cap	Between 1640 and 1644
	B043	4	The angel departing from the family of Tobias	1641
	B061	1	Virgin and child in the clouds	1641
	B098	2	The baptism of the eunuch	1641
	B114	2	The large lion hunt	1641
	B118	2	Three oriental figures [Jacob and Laban?]	1641
	B128	1	Woman at a door hatch talking to a man and children [‘The Schoolmaster’]	1641
	B136	2	The card player	1641
	B225	1	Landscape with a cottage and haybarn: oblong	1641
	B226	1	Landscape with a cottage and a large tree	1641
	B233	1	The windmill	1641
	B261	4	Man at a desk wearing a cross and chain	1641
	B271	2	Cornelis Claesz Anslo, preacher [1592-1646]	1641
	B310	1	Portrait of a boy, in profile	1641
	B040	1	The triumph of Mordechai	About 1641
	B079	2	Christ crucified between the two thieves: an oval plate	About 1641
	B130	3	Man drawing from a cast	About 1641
	B359	1	Sick woman with a large white headdress [Saskia]	About 1641-42
	B369	1	Sheet of studies, with a woman lying ill in bed, etc.	About 1641-42
	B072	2	The raising of Lazarus: the small plate	1642
	B082	1	The descent from the cross: a sketch	1642
	B105	2	St. Jerome in a dark chamber	1642
	B188	4	The flute player [L’espiegle]	1642
	B257	1	Man in an arbor	1642
	B026	1	Self portrait in a flat cap and embroidered dress	About 1642
	B120	1	The Spanish gypsy ‘Preciosa’	About 1642
	B148	1	Student at a table by candlelight	About 1642
	B356	2	Girl with a basket	About 1642
	B157	2	The hog	1643
	B212	1	The Three Trees	1643
	B220	1	The shepherd and his family	1644
	B057	4	The rest on the flight: a night piece	About 1644
	B189	1	The sleeping herdsman	About 1644
	B034	1	Abraham and Isaac	1645
	B058	1	The rest on the flight: lightly etched	1645
	B096	1	St. Peter in penitence	1645
	B208	3	‘Six’s bridge’	1645
	B209	2	The Omval	1645
	B231	3	The boat house [Grotto with a brook; ‘Het spelonkje’]	1645
	B084	1	Christ carried to the tomb	About 1645
	B147	2	Old man in meditation, leaning on a book	About 1645
	B219	1	Cottages and farm buildings with a man sketching	About 1645
	B228	1	Cottages beside a canal	About 1645
	B170	1	Beggar woman leaning on a stick	1646
	B186	5	‘Ledikant’ or ‘Lit à la française’	1646
	B193	2	Nude man seated before a curtain	1646
	B196	2	Nude man seated on the ground with one leg extended	1646
	B280	2	Jan Cornelis Sylvius, preacher [1564-1638]	1646
	B187	1	The monk in the cornfield	About 1646
	B194	3	A young man seated and standing [The walking trainer]	About 1646
	B278	2	Ephraim Bonus, Jewish physician [1599-1655]	1647
	B285	4	Jan Six [1618-1700]	1647
	B277	3	Jan Asselyn, painter [‘Crabbetje’; 1610-52]	About 1647
	B022	5	Self portrait drawing at a window	1648
	B103	2	St. Jerome beside a pollard willow	1648
	B112	5	Medea: or the marriage of Jason and Creusa	1648
	B126	3	Pharisees in the Temple [Jews in the synagogue]	1648
	B176	3	Beggars receiving alms at the door of a house	1648
	B232	3	Cottage with a white paling	1648
	B074	2	Christ preaching [‘The hundred-guilder print’]	About 1643-49
	B159	3	The shell [Conus Marmoreus]	1650
	B217	3	Landscape with three gabled cottages beside a road	1650
	B218	4	Landscape with a square tower	1650
	B235	2	Canal with an angler and two swans	1650
	B236	2	Canal with a large boat and bridge [‘Het schuytje op de voorgrondt’]	1650
	B227	2	Landscape with an obelisk	About 1650
	B237	2	Landscape with a cow	About 1650
	B253	1	The bull [‘Het stiertje’]	About 1650
	B042	2	The blindness of Tobit: the larger plate	1651
	B053	6	The flight into Egypt: a night piece	1651
	B195	2	The bathers	1951
	B234	1	The Goldweigher's Field	1651
	B272	6	Clement de Jonghe, printseller [1624/25-77]	1651
	B370	1	Sheet of studies with the head of the artist, a beggar woman, woman and child	1651
	B113	1	The star of the kings: a night piece	About 1651
	B223	4	Landscape with trees, farm buildings and a tower	About 1651
	B041	3	David in prayer	1652
	B065	3	Christ disputing with the doctors: a sketch	1652
	B222	2	Clump of trees with a vista	1652
	B224	2	Landscape with a hay barn and a flock of sheep	1652
	B046	8	The adoration of the shepherds: a night piece	About 1652
	B067	1	Christ preaching [‘La petite tombe’]	About 1652
	B085	1	The Virgin with the instruments of the passion	About 1652
	B131	2	Peasant family on the tramp	About 1652
	B213	2	Landscape with a fisherman [‘Het melkboertje’]	About 1652
	B221	1	Landscape with a road beside a canal	About 1652
	B270	4	Doctor Fautrieus	About 1652
	B078	5	Christ crucified between the two thieves [‘Three crosses’]	1653
	B056	7	The rest on the flight: altered from Seghers	About 1653
	B211	2	Landscape with a shepherd and a dog [‘Het jagertje’]	About 1653
	B104	2	St. Jerome reading in an Italian landscape	About 1653
	B047	2	The circumcision in the stable	1654
	B055	1	The flight into Egypt: crossing a brook	1654
	B060	1	Christ returning from the Temple with his parents	1654
	B063	2	The Virgin and the child with the cat and snake	1654
	B064	1	Christ seated disputing with the doctors	1654
	B083	1	The descent from the cross by torchlight	1654
	B087	3	Christ at Emmaus: the larger plate	1654
	B125	2	The golf player	1654
	B045	2	The adoration of the shepherds: with the lamp	About 1654
	B050	1	The presentation in the Temple in the dark manner	About 1654
	B086	4	The entombment	About 1654
	B035	1	Abraham's Sacrifice	1655
	B036	3	Four illustrations to a Spanish book	1655
	B076	8	Christ presented to the people: the oblong plate [‘Ecce homo’]	1655
	B123	2	The goldsmith	1655
	B275	5	Pieter Haaringh [‘Young Haaringh’; 1609-85]	1655
	B274	2	Thomas Haaringh [‘Old Haaringh’; died 1660]	About 1655
	B029	1	Abraham Entertaining the Angels	1656
	B089	1	Christ appearing to the apostles	1656
	B276	3	Jan Lutma, goldsmith [1584-1669]	1656
	B284	2	Arnold Tholinx, inspector [died 1679]	About 1656
	B011	1	The artist's son Titus	About 1656
	B107	2	St. Francis beneath a tree praying	1657
	B075	1	The agony in the garden	About 1657
	B273	9	Abraham Francen, apothecary [born 1613]	About 1657
	B070	3	Christ and the woman of Samaria: an arched print	1658
	B110	1	The phoenix or the statue overthrown	1658
	B197	7	Woman sitting half dressed beside a stove	1658
	B199	2	Seated naked woman with a hat beside her [Woman at the bath]	1658
	B200	1	Seated naked woman [‘Woman bathing her feet at a brook’]	1658
	B205	3	‘Negress lying down’	1658
	B282	6	Lieven Willemsz van Coppenol, writing-master [1598 - 1671]	About 1658
	B283	6	Lieven Willemsz van Coppenol, writing-master: the larger plate	About 1658
	B094	4	Peter and John healing the cripple at the gate of the Temple	1659
	B203	2	Jupiter and Antiope: the larger plate	1659
	B202	3	The woman with the arrow [Venus and Cupid?]	1661
	B264	5	Jan Antonides van der Linden [1609-64]	About 1665

== See also ==
- List of paintings by Rembrandt
- List of drawings by Rembrandt
- Self-portraits by Rembrandt

== Sources ==
- The Complete Etchings of Rembrandt Reproduced in Original Size, Gary Schwartz (editor). New York: Dover, 1994.
