= Bacteriophage pRNA =

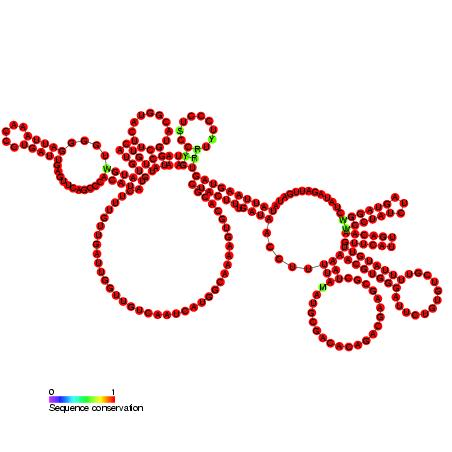
- Predicted secondary structure and sequence conservation of Phage_pRNA

Identifiers
- Symbol: Phage_pRNA
- Rfam: RF00044

Other data
- RNA type: Gene
- Domain: Viruses
- SO: SO:0000655
- PDB structures: PDBe

Bacteriophage pRNA is a ncRNA element. During replication of linear dsDNA viruses, the viral genome is packaged into the pre-formed viral procapsid. The packaging of DNA into the procapsid requires a molecular motor, which uses ATP as energy to accomplish the energetically unfavorable motion. In some bacteriophage, an RNA (pRNA) molecule is a vital component of this motor. Structural analyses of the packaging motor have demonstrated that the pRNA molecule has fivefold symmetry when attached to the prohead. The pRNA is thought to be bound by the capsid connector protein. Only the first 120 bases of the pRNA are essential for packing the viral DNA. The pRNA is proposed to be composed of two domains, one corresponding to the first 120 bases and the second to the remaining 50 bases. Nuclear cleavage occurs in the single strand region linking these two domains.
