= Drypoint =

Intaglio printmaking technique

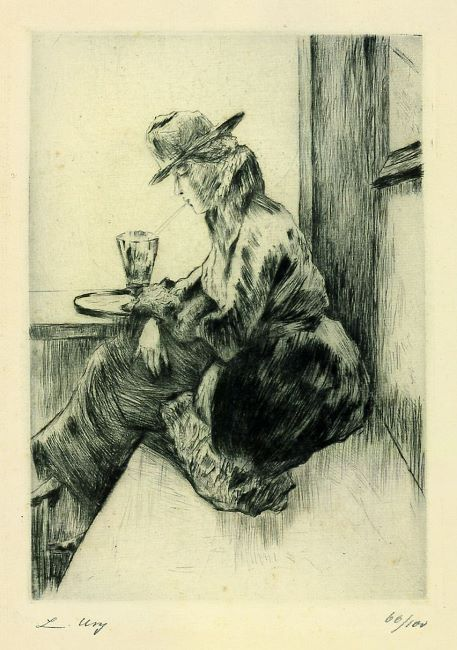
Woman in Cafe, drypoint with burr by Lesser Ury

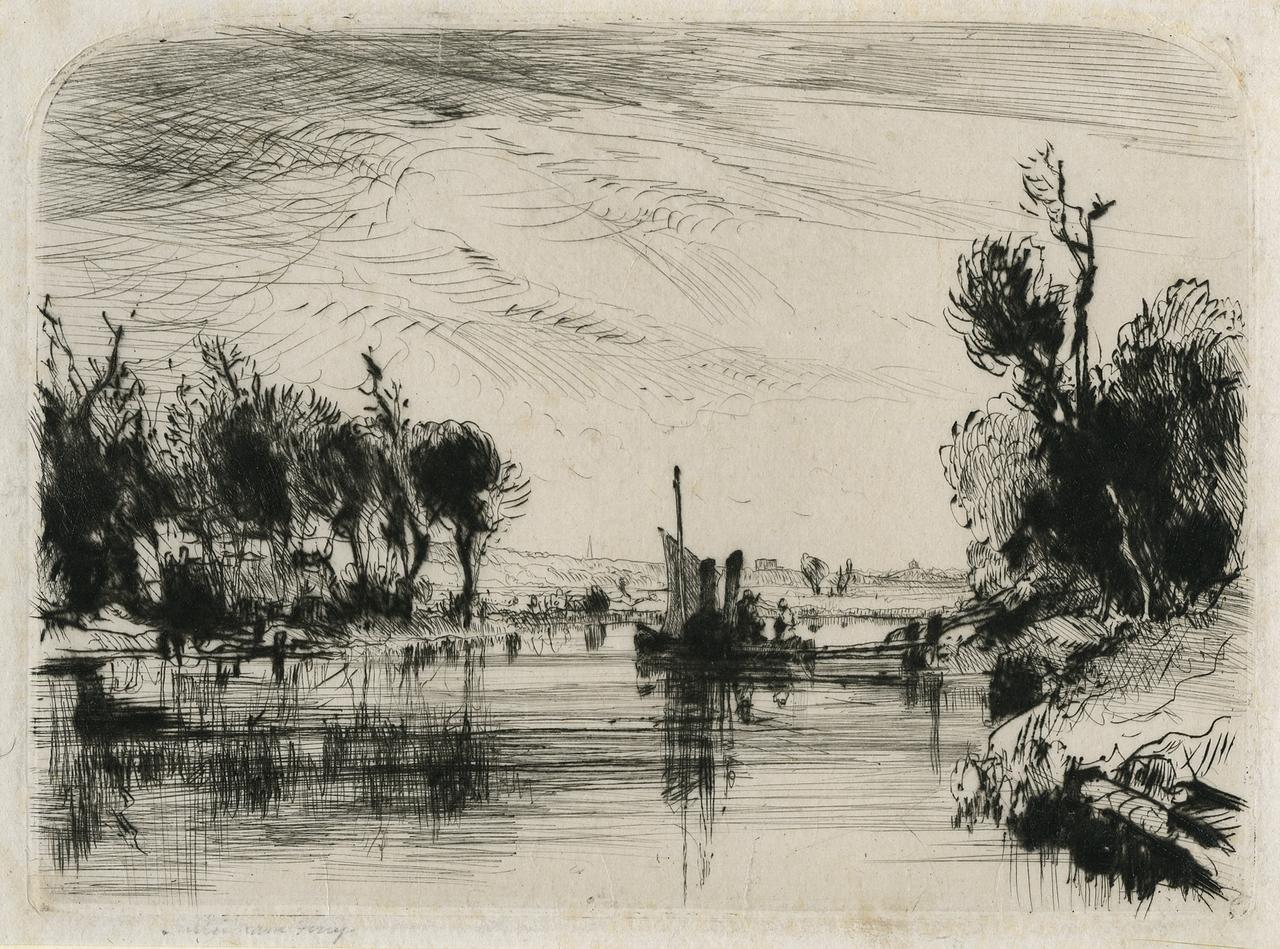
Surlingham Ferry - looking towards Norwich, drypoint with very rich burr by Edward Thomas Daniell

Drypoint is a printmaking technique of the intaglio family, in which an image is incised into a plate (or "matrix") with a hard-pointed "needle" of sharp metal or diamond. In principle, the method is practically identical to engraving. The difference is in the use of tools, and that the raised ridge along the furrow is not scraped or filed away as in engraving. Traditionally the plate was copper, but now acetate, zinc, or plexiglas are also commonly used.

Like etching, drypoint is easier to master than engraving for an artist trained in drawing because the technique of using the needle is closer to using a pencil than the engraver's burin. The incision into the plate is also typically much more shallow, so requiring less effort and technical skill in the use of the engraver's burin, but meaning that fewer impressions (copies) of a print can be pulled before wear to the plate becomes apparent. Modern limited editions of drypoint prints (if not steelfaced) very often have fewer than thirty impressions.

The technique can be used on a plate in conjunction with other intaglio techniques, and has very often been so used, especially with etching and engraving.

The term is also used for inkless scratched inscriptions, such as glosses in manuscripts.

== Lines and burrs ==
The lines produced by printing a drypoint are formed by the burr thrown up at the edge of the incised lines, in addition to the depressions formed in the surface of the plate. A larger burr, formed by a steep angle of the tool, will hold a lot of ink, producing a characteristically soft, dense line that differentiates drypoint from other intaglio methods such as etching or engraving which produce a smooth, hard-edged line. The size or characteristics of the burr usually depend not on how much pressure is applied, but on the angle of the needle. A perpendicular angle will leave little to no burr, while the smaller the angle gets to either side, the larger the burr pileup. The deepest drypoint lines leave enough burr on either side of them that they prevent the paper from pushing down into the center of the stroke, creating a feathery black line with a fine, white center. A lighter line may have no burr at all, creating a very fine line in the final print by holding very little ink.

This technique is different from engraving, in which the incisions are made by removing metal to form depressions in the plate surface which hold ink, although the two methods can easily be combined, as Rembrandt often did. Because the recurring pressure of printing soon destroys the burr, drypoint is useful only for comparatively small editions; as few as ten or twenty impressions with burr can be made, and after the burr has gone, the comparatively shallow lines will wear out relatively quickly. Most impressions of Rembrandt prints on which drypoint was used show no burr, and often the drypoint lines are very weak, leaving the etched portions still strong. To counter this and allow for longer print runs, electroplating (called steelfacing by printmakers) can harden the surface of a plate and allow the same edition size as produced by etchings and engravings.

== History ==
The technique appears to have been invented by the Housebook Master, a south German 15th-century artist, all of whose prints are in drypoint only. Among the most famous artists of the old master print, Albrecht Dürer produced 3 drypoints before abandoning the technique; Rembrandt used it frequently, but usually in conjunction with etching and engraving. As intaglio techniques, they can all be used on the same plate. Alex Katz used this process to create several of his famous works, such as "Sunny" and "The Swimmer".

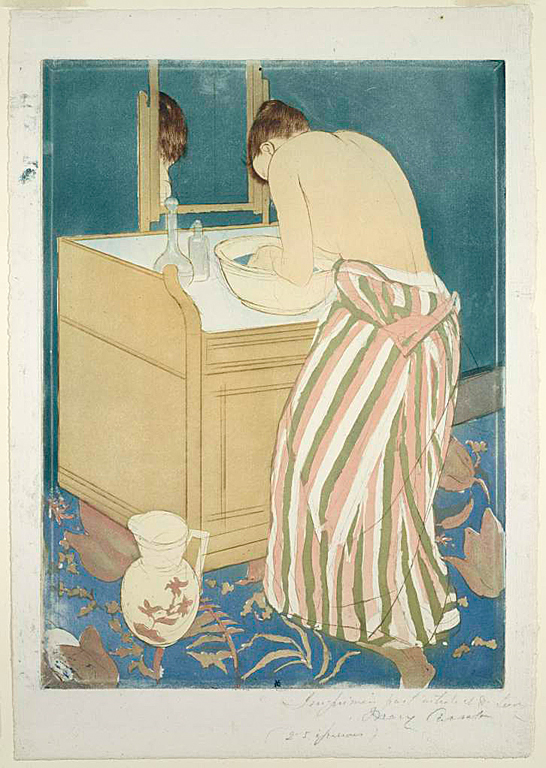
Mary Cassatt, Woman Bathing, drypoint combined with aquatint, 1890–01

In the 20th century many artists produced drypoints, including Max Beckmann, Milton Avery, Hermann-Paul and Martin Lewis. By adding aquatint work on the plate and inking with various colours, artists such as Mary Cassatt have produced colour drypoints. Canadian artist David Brown Milne is credited as the first to produce coloured drypoints by the use of multiple plates, one for each colour. On the West Coast of the United States the respected printmaker Pedro Joseph de Lemos simplified the methods for producing drypoints in art schools.

Contemporary artists who have extensively used drypoint include Louise Bourgeois, Vija Celmins, William Kentridge and Richard Spare.

== Types of needles ==
Any sharp object can theoretically be used to make a drypoint, as long as it can be used to carve lines into metal. Dentistry tools, nails, and metal files can all be used to produce drypoints. However, certain types of needles are created specifically for drypoints:

- Diamond-tipped needles carve easily through any metal and never need sharpening, but they are expensive.
- Carbide-tipped steel needles can also be used to great effect, and are cheaper than diamond-tipped needles, but they need frequent sharpening to maintain a sharp point. Steel needles were traditionally used.

== Printing processes ==
Pablo Picasso, 1909, Two Nude Figures (Deux figures nues), steel-faced drypoint on Arches laid paper, 13 x 11 cm, printed by Delâtre, Paris, published by Daniel-Henry Kahnweiler

Printing is essentially the same as for the other intaglio techniques, but extra care is taken to preserve the burr. After the image is finished, or at least ready to proof, the artist applies ink to the plate with a dauber. Too much pressure will flatten the burrs and ruin the image. Once the plate is completely covered with a thin layer, a small scraper or card is gently used to remove excess ink. Then, a tarlatan cloth tightly wrapped in a spherical shape will be used to wipe away excess ink, by slowly yet firmly rubbing the smooth side of the sphere on the plate in small circular motions. Paper (typically pages from old phone books) may be used for a final wipe of the lightest areas of the image. Some printmakers will use their bare hand instead to wipe these areas. Once the desired amount of ink is removed, the plate is run through an etching press along with a piece of dampened paper to produce a print.

A dampened paper may be produced by soaking a piece of printing paper, or any other papers that are slightly water-absorbent but are not water soluble, into a tray of water for about 5 minutes. Afterwards, the paper is laid onto a towel and dabbed dry. The moist paper allows ink to be drawn out from the burred lines of the plate when it is pressed into it.

=== Hand-wiping techniques ===
Drypoint wiping techniques vary slightly from other intaglio techniques. Less pressure is applied to achieve desirable lines, because the burrs forming the image are more fragile than etched or engraved lines, but also because the ink rests on the plate surface, instead of pressed down into indentations. Also, because of the characteristics of the way the burrs catch ink, the direction of the wiping matters. Ink tends to pile up in the lee of the burr during the application of the ink and wiping with the tarlatan, so if the printer wipes in the direction of the lines with their hand, they may remove most of the ink, leaving a light gray line. However, if they wipe perpendicularly to the line, they can actually increase the pile of ink on the other side of the line, darkening the printed line.
