= Portrait of a Young Gentleman =

Painting attributed to Rembrandt, c. 1635

Portrait of a gentleman, half-length, in a black velvet cloak and white lace collar and cuffs
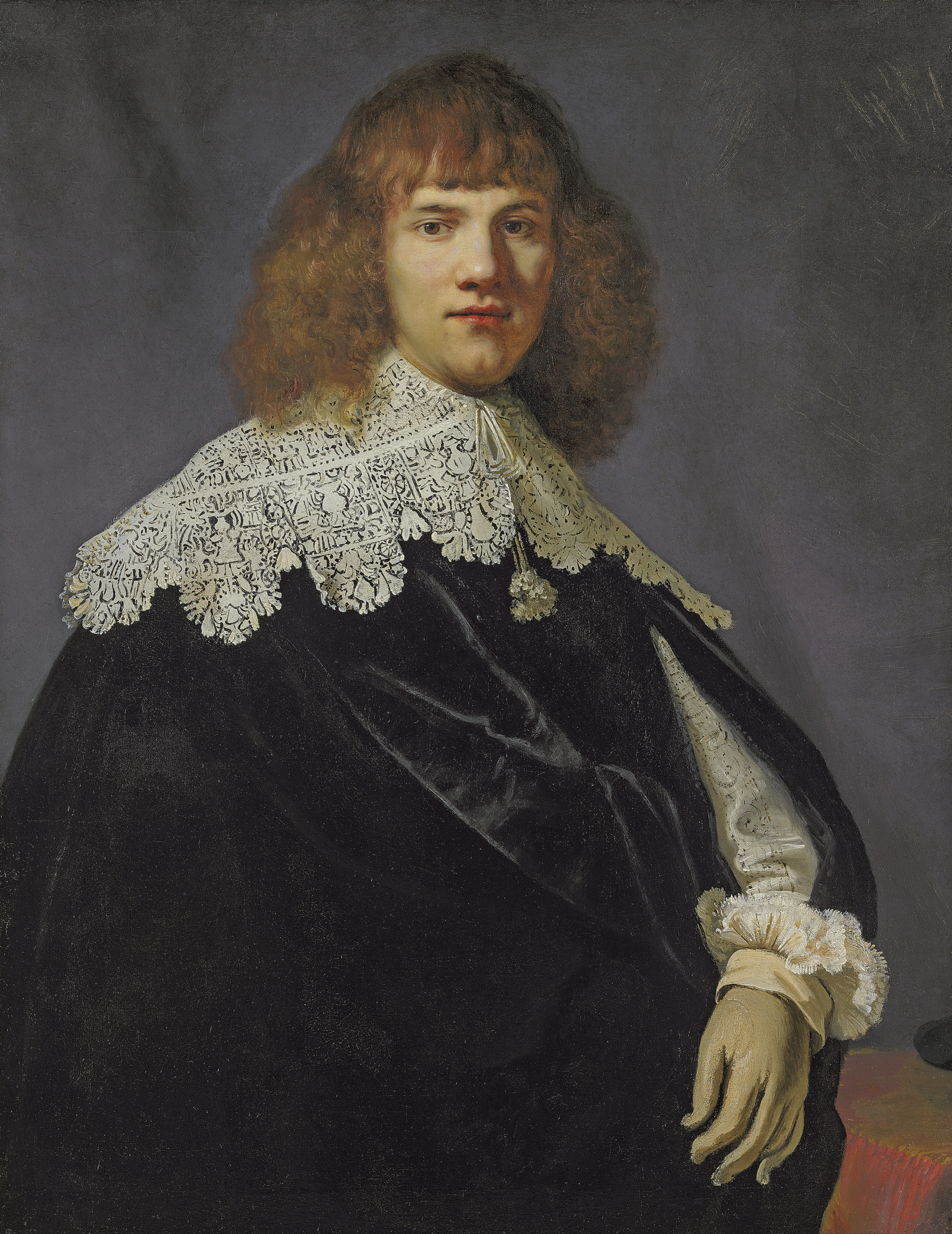
- Artist: Rembrandt
- Year: c. 1635
- Medium: oil paint, canvas
- Dimensions: 94.5 cm (37.2 in) × 73.5 cm (28.9 in)

Portrait of a Young Gentleman is a c. 1635 painting attributed to the Dutch painter Rembrandt. The painting has not yet been catalogued as by Rembrandt, but was sold as "circle of Rembrandt" by Christie's in London for GBP 137,000 (approximately $185,000).

The painting was discovered and purchased through an anonymous investor by Dutch art dealer Jan Six.

Jan Six lives in Amsterdam and showed the Christie's catalog entry to Ernst van de Wetering before booking a ticket to London to attend the sale. The image struck him as being very Rembrandt-like. His main clue was the tentative date in the sale catalog of "1633-1635" while it was attributed to "circle of Rembrandt". At that young age, Rembrandt didn't have a "circle" yet, so the painting was very possibly an original exemplar of "Rembrandt juvenalia", an area that has only in recent decades begun to be explored. After viewing the painting and noticing the careful lacework, Six rushed over to the National Gallery to look at their Portrait of Philips Lucasz, dating from the same period and showing similar lacework. The pendant portrait of that painting, Portrait of Petronella Buys, also contains lace and shows the same sort of background to both of the other paintings. It was sold by Christie's in the same saleroom for GBP 3,368,750 on 17 October 2017.

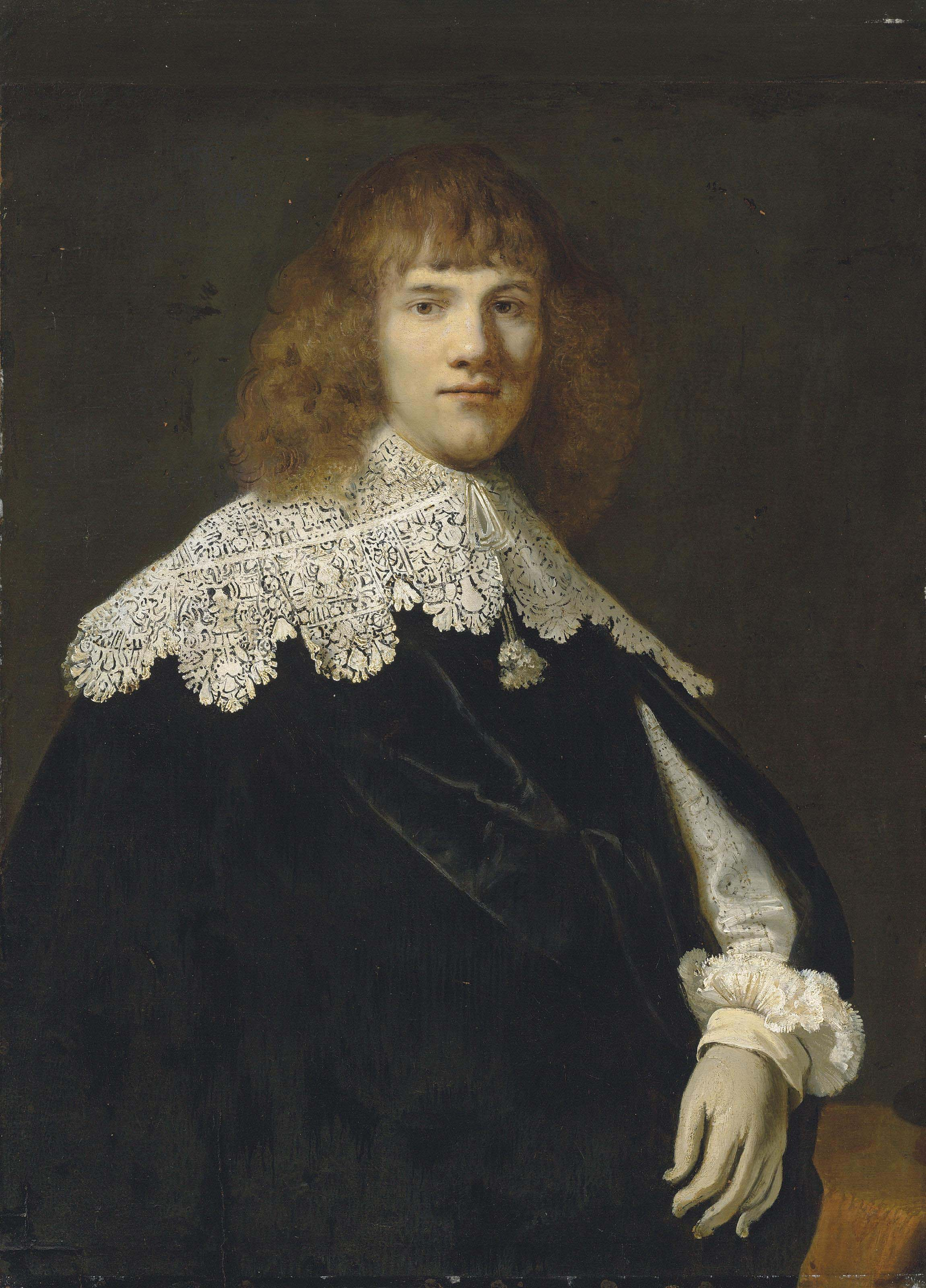
Portrait before restoration, as it appeared in the sale

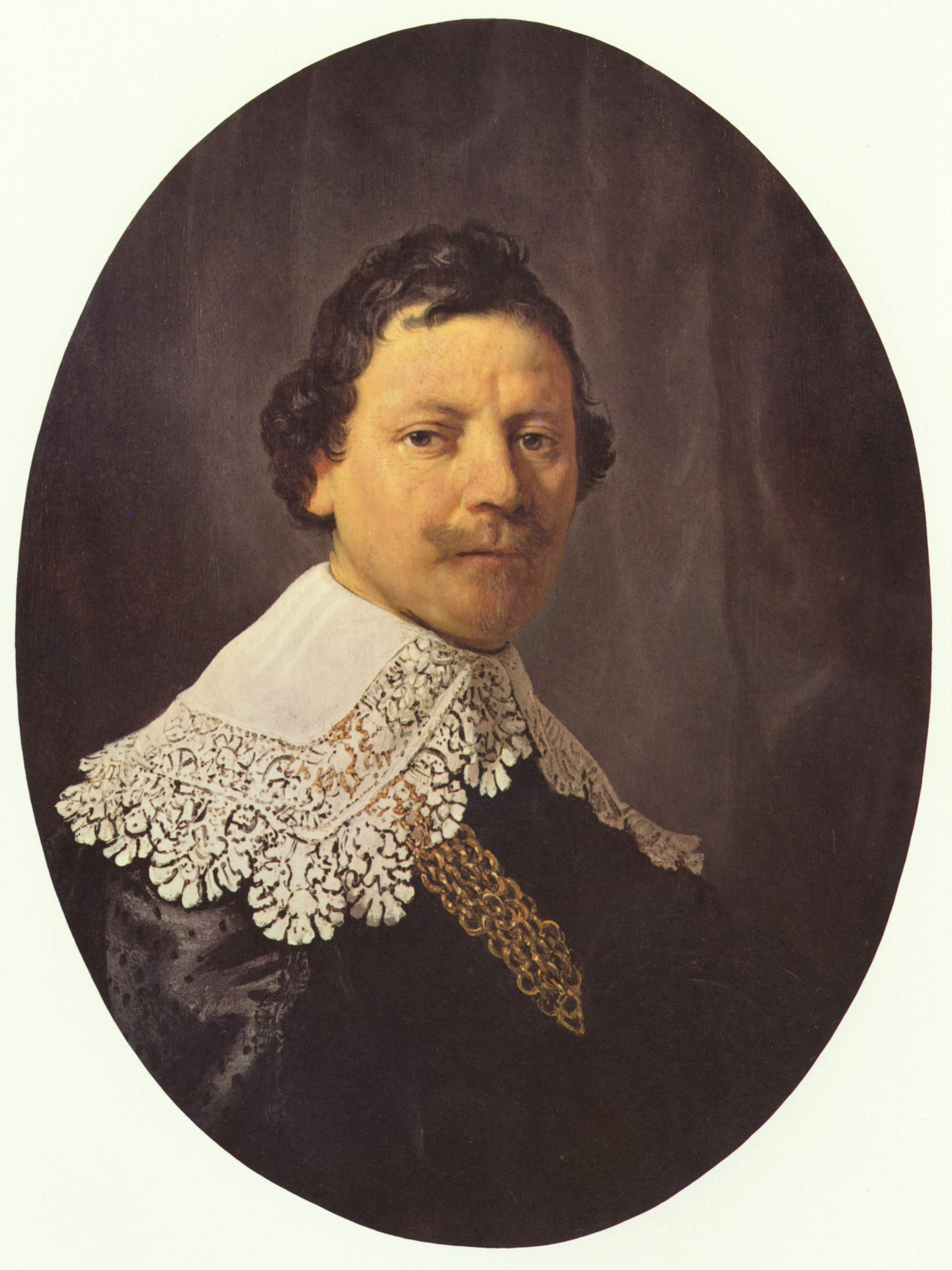
Portrait of Philips Lucasz, 1635 painting by Rembrandt in the National Gallery

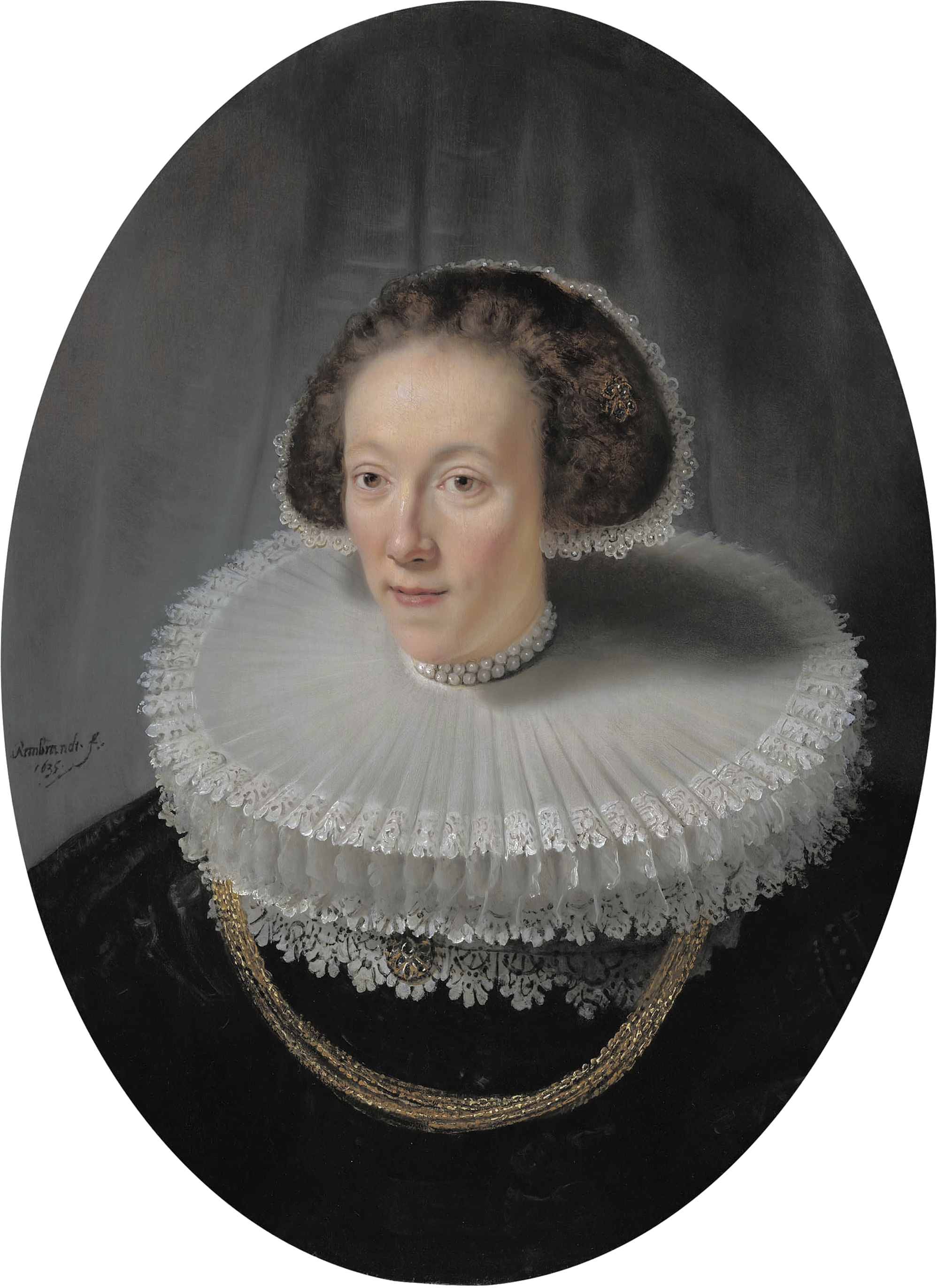
Portrait of Petronella Buys, 1635 wife's pendant of the Lucasz (private collection)

At the time he saw the painting in the catalog, Jan Six had another Rembrandt painting, Suffer little children to come unto me, undergoing restoration with Martin Bijl, in preparation for an exhibition in 2019, 'Rembrandt year'. The son of the restorer, Dutch art dealer Sander Bijl, had also noticed the Christie's catalog entry for Portrait of a gentleman, half-length, in a black velvet cloak and white lace collar and cuffs and had approached Six with a plan to buy the painting together. He ended up bidding against him, and only later found out that it was sold to Six when his father was again contracted for the restoration. A Dutch controversy ensued over the proper rights to the discovery. Currently, the painting is on view in Amsterdam.

== Provenance ==
The painting was sold from a private owner descended from Sir Richard Neave, 1st Baronet, who probably acquired it, and if not by him, then it was acquired by his son, Sir Thomas Neave, 2nd Baronet (1761–1848).
