= Jan Six (art dealer) =

Dutch art historian

Jonkheer Jan Six (born 25 June 1978), also known as Jan Six XI, is a Dutch art dealer and art historian.

Six is a member of the Six family, a descendant of Jan Six, the subject of Rembrandt's Portrait of Jan Six. He is the son of Jonkheer Jan Six X, the present Lord of Hillegom (Dutch: Heer van Hillegom).

== Biography ==
Six grew up in Amsterdam, from the age of 11 living in the building on the Amstel that houses the Six Collection, including the Portrait of Jan Six.

From 1998 to 2003, Six studied art history and archaeology at the University of Amsterdam.

After graduating, he worked for five years at the auction house Sotheby's, first in London, then for the last two years as head of the Old Masters team in Amsterdam. In 2009, when the company started to downsize, among other things wishing to close the branch in Amsterdam, he resigned at Sotheby's. He started his own art dealership in the Old Masters, Jan Six Fine Art, located on the Herengracht in Amsterdam, working in partnership with the London firm Hazlitt, Gooden & Fox. He has been an art dealer since then.

Besides his work dealing in art by the Old Masters, Six also collects modern art.

== Art discovery and scandal ==
In 2018, Six identified Portrait of a Young Gentleman, attributed by Christie's as "circle of Rembrandt", as the work of Rembrandt himself. This was the first 'new' Rembrandt identified in 44 years.

Shortly after having the portrait attributed as a Rembrandt a fellow art dealer Sander Bijl accused Jan of unfairly breaking an agreement to co-purchase the painting. According to Bijl he was the one who actually discovered the painting in a Christies auction. For a second opinion Bijl went to Jan who agreed that they should split the cost and potential earnings. According to Bijl's allegations Jan cheated him by purchasing it on his own to cut him out. However, Bijl had a limit to his spending and Six did not.
