= Six family =

Dutch family

- noble family
- Country: Netherlands
- Founded: 16th century
- Founder: Guillaume Six
- Titles: baron for first born, Jonkheer

Six is a well-known Dutch family from Amsterdam. The family originally came from the region of Lille in the north of France.

== History ==
The name Six is an abbreviation of Sixtus, a name given to the sixth child of a family.

The first known member, Guillaume Six, was a linen weaver in Armentières and Lille. His son Charles Six moved the family to Amsterdam circa 1586. Charles Six's children were:

- Guillaume Six (1563–1619), ancestor of the Six van Oterleek branch of the family
- Chrétienne Six (1566–1645), married Nicolaus Mulerius (1564–1630), medic and astronomer
- Jean Six (1575–1617), ancestor of the Six van Hillegom branch of the family

Both branches of the family have been raised to the Dutch nobility at the rank of baron, with other members of the family carrying the honorific of Jonkheer.

=== Six van Oterleek ===
Cornelis Charles Six van Oterleek (1772–1833) served as Finance Minister of the Netherlands 1814–1821. He was raised to the nobility with the title Jonkheer in 1815, and raised to the hereditary rank of baron in 1820.

Willem Six (1829–1908) served as Interior Minister of the Netherlands 1879–1882.

=== Six van Hillegom ===
Several family members were painted by Rembrandt. This branch of the family are the keepers of the Six Collection.

Jean Six (1575–1617) died two months before the birth of his son Jan Six (1618–1700), Mayor of Amsterdam, a writer and a notable art collector. His son Jan Six II (1668–1750), also Mayor of Amsterdam, bought the fiefdom of Hillegom.

Jan Six VII (1857–1926) was an art historian, and Rector of the University of Amsterdam. He opened the family art collection to the public as the Six Collection in 1922.

The present baron is Jan Six X. His son Jan Six XI is an art historian and art dealer, who identified Portrait of a Young Gentleman as by Rembrandt, the first 'new' Rembrandt identified in 44 years.

== Famous members ==
- Jan Six (1618–1700), Mayor of Amsterdam
- Jan Six (1668–1750), Mayor of Amsterdam
- Cornelis Charles Six van Oterleek (1772–1833), Finance Minister of the Netherlands
- Hendrik Six (1790–1847) and his wife Lucretia Johanna van Winter (1785–1845), art collectors
- Willem Six (1829–1908), Interior Minister of the Netherlands
- Jan Six (1857–1926), art historian, Rector of the University of Amsterdam
- Tom Six (born 1973), film-maker, writer/director of the (in)famous The Human Centipede films
- Jan Six (born 1978), art dealer and art historian

== Bibliography ==
- Nederland's Adelsboek 93 (2008), p. 139-191.
