= Neave baronets =

Title in the Baronetage of Great Britain

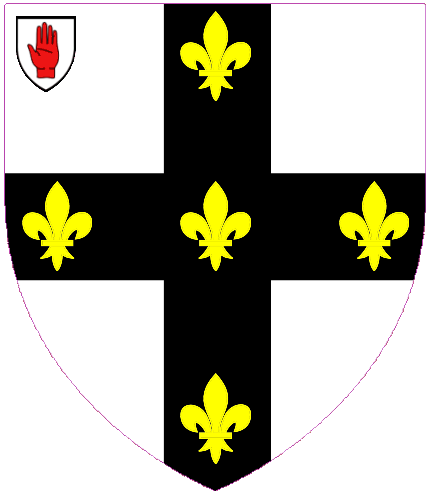
- Crest: Out of a ducal coronet Gold a lily stalked and leaved Vert flowered and seeded Or.
- Shield: Argent on a cross Sable five fleurs-de-lis Or.
- Motto: Sola Proba Quae Honesta

The Neave baronetcy, of Dagnam Park in the County of Essex, is a title in the Baronetage of Great Britain. It was created on 13 May 1795 for Richard Neave, Governor of the Bank of England from 1783 to 1785.

== Neave baronets, of Dagnam Park (1795) ==
- Sir Richard Neave, 1st Baronet (1731–1814)
- Sir Thomas Neave, 2nd Baronet (1761–1848)
- Sir Richard Digby Neave, 3rd Baronet (1793–1868)
- Sir Arundell Neave, 4th Baronet (1829–1877)
- Sir Thomas Lewis Hughes Neave, 5th Baronet (1874–1940)
- Sir Arundell Thomas Clifton Neave, 6th Baronet (1916–1992)
- Sir Paul Arundell Neave, 7th Baronet (born 1948)

The heir apparent is the present holder's son Frederick Paul Kinahan Neave (born 1981).

== Extended family ==
Dorina Neave (1880–1955), author and wife of the 5th Baronet, settled with her husband at Dagnam Park and was the last of the family to live there before its requisition in the winter of 1940 and eventual demolition in 1950.

The soldier and Conservative politician Airey Neave was the son of Sheffield Airey Neave, grandson of Sheffield Neave, third son of the 2nd Baronet. After his assassination in 1979 his widow Diana Neave was created a life peer as Baroness Airey of Abingdon in his honour.

Baronetage of Great Britain
Preceded by Darell baronets	Neave baronets of Dagnam Park; 13 May 1795	Succeeded by Hawley baronets
