= Portrait of Jan Six (etching) =

1647 etching by Rembrandt

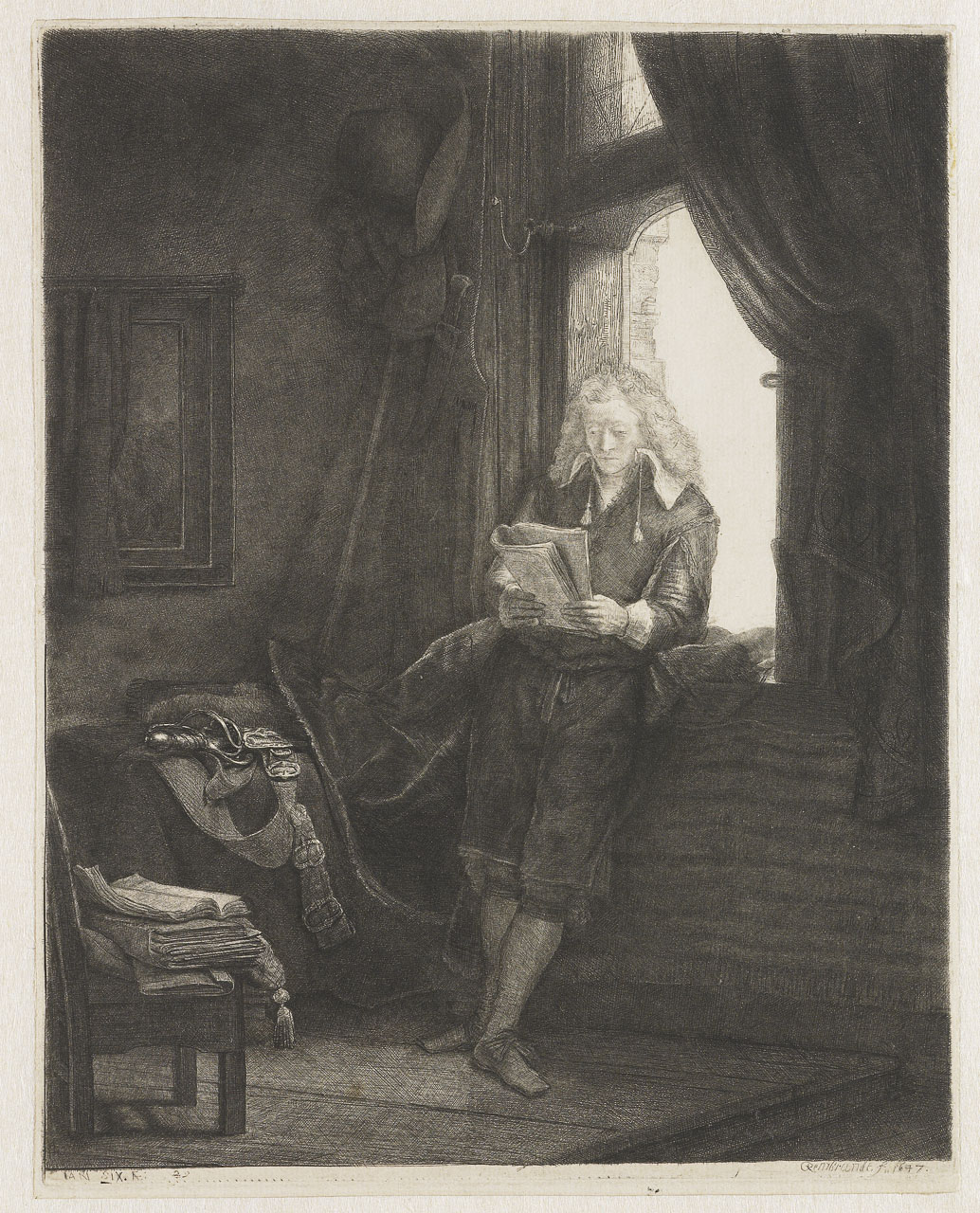

Portrait of Jan Six is a 1647 etching by Rembrandt, known in five states. It shows Jan Six, also the subject of a painted portrait by the same artist.

Adam von Bartsch assigned the etching the number B. 285. Impressions of it are in the British Museum, Hermitage Museum and Rijksmuseum.

== See also ==
- List of drawings by Rembrandt
- List of etchings by Rembrandt
