= Sir Digby Neave, 3rd Baronet =

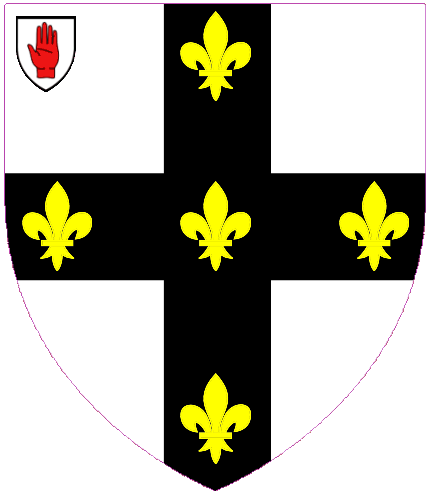
Shield of arms

Sir Richard Digby Neave, 3rd Baronet (1793–1868), usually known as Digby Neave, was an English artist and author.

== Early life ==
He was the eldest son of Sir Thomas Neave, 2nd Baronet, and brother of Sheffield Neave. He was educated at St Mary's Hall, Oxford, graduating in 1815. He later described Edward Penrhyn as a travelling companion of the years 1817–8.

Neave became Steward of the Liberty of Havering-atte-Bower in 1821.

== Railway director ==
Related by marriage to Abel Rous Dottin—Neave's father-in-law was Dottin's brother-in-law—he attended the initial meeting for the London and Greenwich Railway in October 1831. It took place in Dottin's house at 31 Argyle Street, London. Neave became one of the railway company's directors, resigning on 26 November 1836. He was then involved also, as of 1837, in the Dover Railway Company and New Gravesend Railway Company.

== Poor Law administrator ==
Neave acted as the first Assistant Poor Law Commissioner, in the Chester area, from January 1836. He was then described as a Justice of the Peace, of Havering atte Bower, Essex. He owed his appointment to the recommendation of "E. Penhryn", writing to John Shaw-Lefevre. This person has been identified as the future Edward Douglas-Pennant, 1st Baron Penrhyn, but possibly was his friend Edward Penhryn, a barrister. Another recommendation was from Sir Charles Trevelyan, a cousin, who let it be known that the appointment would please him.

As mentor, Neave had Edward Gulson. They had a meeting in February 1836 at Clumber, with Henry Pelham-Clinton, 4th Duke of Newcastle. Another meeting to deal with Nottinghamshire Poor Law union issues, in the context of local politics and personalities, was with Robert Lowe at Bingham.

Edwin Chadwick sought material with which to advocate against the Cheshire Constabulary, set up in 1829, and Neave supplied it. The 1837 general election caused local resistance in Cheshire to poor law reform, which Neave characterised as "backsliding". In implementing the Poor Law Amendment Act 1834, he failed to reform the Chester workhouse, which continued on the old basis to the 1860s.

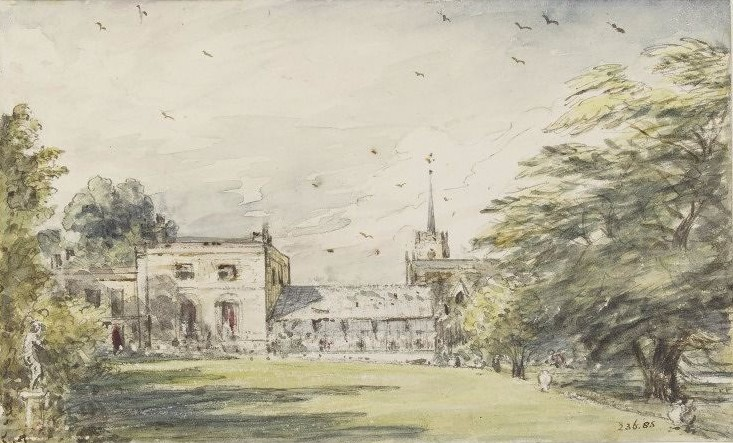
Pitt Place, Epsom, the house of Mr. Digby Neave, 1831 watercolour by John Constable

== Friendship with John Constable ==
Neave was a friend of John Constable, visiting his London studio on 21 May 1819. In 1825 Constable painted portraits of Neave and his brother Sheffield. In the same year, Neave became godfather to Constable's daughter Emily. Constable stayed with him at Epsom; this was at Pitt Place, which at that date, 1831, was leased by Neave from Rowland Stephenson. He and family members later bought it at auction, in 1840.

== Later life ==
A book from 1841 described Pitt Place as Neave's seat. He became the third baronet, on his father's death in 1848. He later resided at Dagnam Park, Romford, Essex. In 1861 he was elected a member of the Royal Geographical Society.

== Works ==
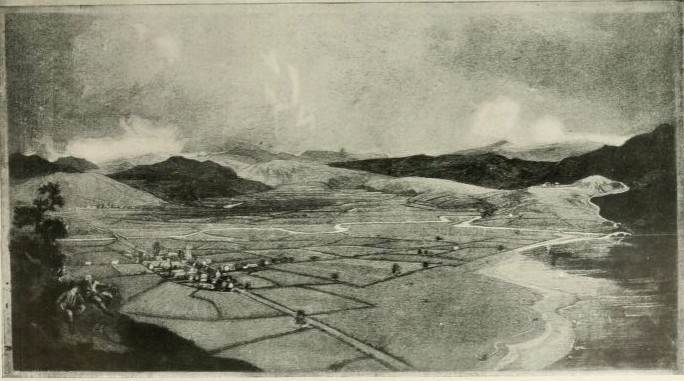
Landscape painting, mezzotint after Digby Neave

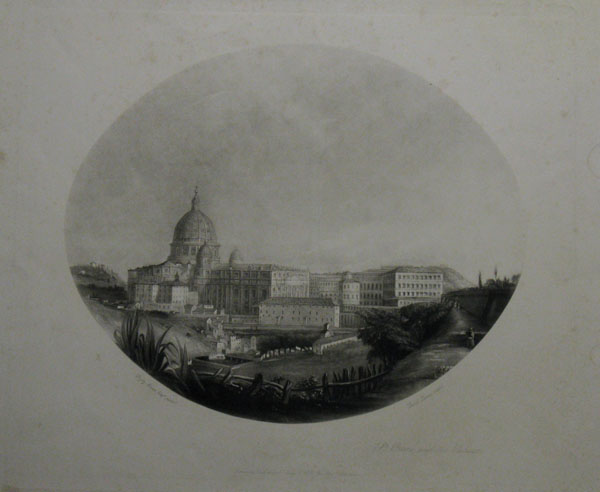
St. Peter's, Vatican, mezzotint after Digby Neave

Neave was a landscape painter, and exhibited at the Royal Academy A Scene in the New Forest. Two of his landscapes were engraved by David Lucas.

Four Days in Connemara (1852), a post-Irish Famine travelogue by Neave, was called "more polemical than topographical" by The Athenaeum. It took an interest in workhouses and places of correction. Four Days also expressed great anxiety over the impending Irish elections of Autumn 1852, which saw a return of a great many Irish MPs from throughout the country intent on working together to reform Ireland's landholding policies (see Charles Gavan Duffy The League of North and South: An Episode of Irish History, 1850-1854).

== Family ==
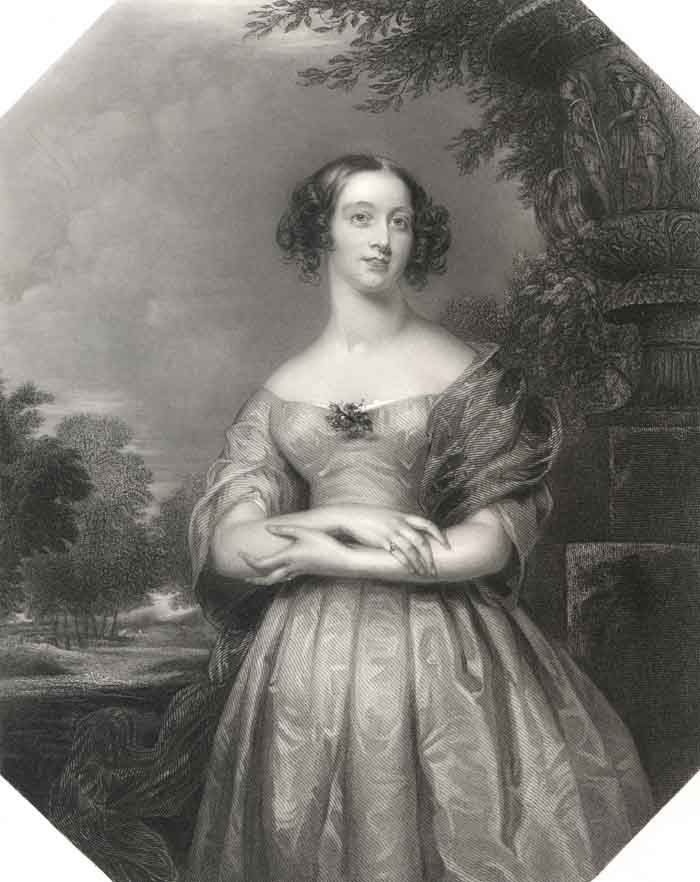
Mary Neave

Neave married Mary Arundell, daughter of James Everard Arundell, 9th Baron Arundell of Wardour (died 29 August 1849). They had six sons and five daughters:

1. Arundell Neave, 4th Baronet, married Gwyn Gertrude Hughes, daughter of William Hughes, 1st Baron Dinorben. Their son Thomas Lewis Hughes Neave, 5th Baronet was a major landowner, holding nearly 10,000 acres (4,000 ha) in England and Wales.
2. Edward Digby (1830–1858), Bombay Civil Service.
3. Kenelm (d. 1861), Bombay Army.
4. Wyndham (d. 1858), 71st Highlanders, died in action in Morar, Gwalior on 16 June during the Central Indian campaign of 1858.
5. Ednowain Reginald, graduated B.A. 1865 at Trinity Hall, Cambridge
6. Augustus, died an infant. (Not counted in the sons are Reginald, died an infant on 2 April 1836, and Edgar, died 10 July 1849, aged 11 months.)

And

1. Mary Blanche, married 1860 the barrister John Richard Westgarth Hale (later surname Hildyard) (died 1888)
2. Frances Eleanor
3. Venetia, married 1860 the cleric and landowner John Whitaker Maitland
4. Cicely, married 1863 the barrister Wyndham Slade, son of Sir John Slade, 1st Baronet by his second wife
5. Mariquita, married 1874 Alexander George Middleton, a second cousin.

Coat of arms of Sir Digby Neave, 3rd Baronet

Crest
Out of a ducal coronet Gold a lily stalked and leaved Vert flowered and seeded Or.
Escutcheon
Argent on a cross Sable five fleurs-de-lis Or.
Motto
Sola Proba Quae Honesta

== Notes ==
Baronetage of Great Britain
Preceded by Thomas Neave	Baronet (of Dagnam Park); 1848–1868	Succeeded by Arundell Neave
