= Jan Six (art historian) =

Dutch art historian (1857–1926)

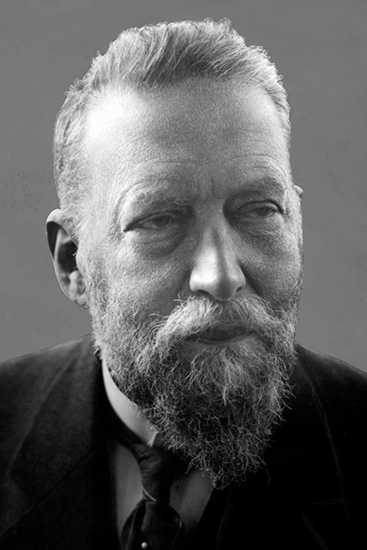
Jan Six (date unknown)

Jan Six (2 February 1857, Amsterdam – 8 December 1926, Amsterdam) was a Dutch art historian.

== Biography ==
He was a member of the noble Six family, which originated in Lille. His father, Jan Pieter Six (1824–1899), Lord of Hillegom and Wimmenum, was a local administrator and numismatist. His mother, Catharina née Teding van Berkhout (1834–1887), was also from a noble family.

From 1875 to 1883, he studied classical literature at the University of Amsterdam. He was also enrolled at the Rijksakademie, and took courses in classical archaeology from Reinhard Kekulé von Stradonitz, at the University of Bonn. In 1885, he obtained his PhD (cum laude) for his thesis The Gorgon, which was sponsored by the art historian, Allard Pierson, and published by R. Kröber-Bakels of Amstelveen. In 1889, after several visits to Rome, he became a private tutor at the university.

He was named a professor of general art history at the Rijksakademie in 1890. That same year, he married Hieronijma Maria Antonia Fortuna Bosch Reitz (1867–1951); sister of the painter Gijs Bosch Reitz. They had six children, including the World War II resistance fighter, Pieter Jacob Six.

In 1896, he received a special appointment as Professor of aesthetics and art history at the university; succeeding his former mentor, Pierson. He was elected a member of the Royal Netherlands Academy of Arts and Sciences in 1906, an organization of which his father and grandfather were also members. Two years later, during a visit by Kaiser Wilhelm II, he was named a Knight (2nd Class) in the Order of the Crown of Prussia. He also became a Knight in the Order of the Netherlands Lion, and a Commander in the Order of Orange-Nassau.

He was appointed Rector Magnificus at the university in 1919. Four years before his death, he established the Six Foundation, to sort and maintain his large collection of books and antique objects; including a portrait of his ancestor, the Mayor of Amsterdam, also named Jan Six, painted by Rembrandt.

Six's technique, a method for painting Greek Black-figure pottery, that he first described, was named in his honor. In 1932, his collection was acquired by the Allard Pierson Foundation, created by Pierson's son Jan Lodewijk. It was added to Pierson's collection to form the basis of the Allard Pierson Museum.

== Sources ==
- "Six, jhr. Jan (1857-1926)" by Emilie Haspels, in: Biografisch Woordenboek van Nederland, Part I, 1979
- Biography and references by Monique Daniels @ the Dictionary of Art Historians
- Lothar Wickert: Beiträge zur Geschichte des Deutschen Archäologischen Instituts 1879 bis 1929, Von Zabern, Mainz 1979, ISBN 3-8053-0395-5 pp. 86, 90, 197
