= Wyndham Deedes =

British Army general and civil administrator (1883–1956)

Brigadier-General Sir Wyndham Deedes CMG DSO
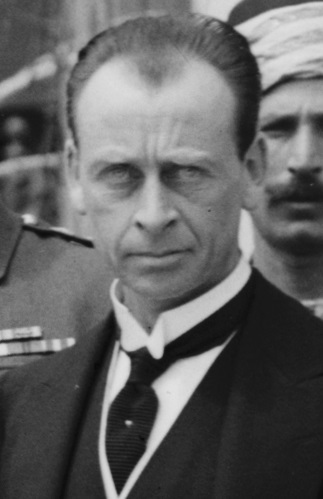
- Deedes in 1920
- Born: Wyndham Henry Deedes; 10 March 1883; Kent, England
- Died: 2 September 1956 (aged 73); Kent, England
- Relatives: William Deedes
- Military career
- Allegiance: United Kingdom
- Branch: British Army
- Service years: 1901–1923
- Rank: Brigadier-General
- Conflicts: Second Boer War; World War I: Battle of Gallipoli
- Awards: Companion of the Order of St Michael and St George; Distinguished Service Order
- Other work: Councillor; Social worker

Brigadier-General Sir Wyndham Henry Deedes, CMG, DSO (10 March 1883 – 2 September 1956) was a British Army officer and civil administrator. He was the Chief Secretary to the British High Commissioner of the British Mandate of Palestine.

== Early life ==
Deedes was born on 10 March 1883 in Kent, England. He was the youngest son of East Kent gentry, Colonel Herbert George Deedes, whose family had owned the land between Hythe and Ashford for four centuries, and his wife Rose Elinor Barrow.

The young Deedes was educated at Eton College, an all-boys boarding school in Berkshire.

== Military career ==
On 4 February 1901, Deedes was commissioned into the 9th Battalion, King's Royal Rifle Corps as a second lieutenant. He was posted to South Africa where he fought in the Second Boer War. On 22 January 1906, Deedes was promoted to lieutenant and seconded to the Colonial Office. During this time he learned Turkish. By 1910 he had enough of a command of the language to satisfy a posting to Constantinople. On 8 May 1910, Deedes was seconded for service under the Foreign Office. While still a part of the British military he undertook the responsibility to reform the Ottoman Gendarmerie force from 1910 till the start of the World War I, he was an influential figure in Ottoman Interior Ministry.

During the First World War, Deedes saw service in Gallipoli, where he took part in the Gallipoli Campaign. On 27 April 1915, the then Captain Deedes was appointed as a General Staff Officer (2nd Class). Deedes was promoted to Major on 14 September 1916. On 1 January 1916, he was appointed Companion of the Distinguished Service Order (DSO) "for distinguished service in the field". In October 1916, he was awarded the Order of the White Eagle, 4th Class (with Swords) by King Peter I of Serbia. On 21 March 1917, Deedes was promoted to temporary Lieutenant Colonel upon appointment as a General Staff Officer (1st Class) in the General Staff. On 3 June 1917, Deedes was awarded the rank of Brevet Colonel "for distinguished service in the field". During the war, he was honoured by the French Republic with the appointment to the Legion of Honour as a Chevalier.

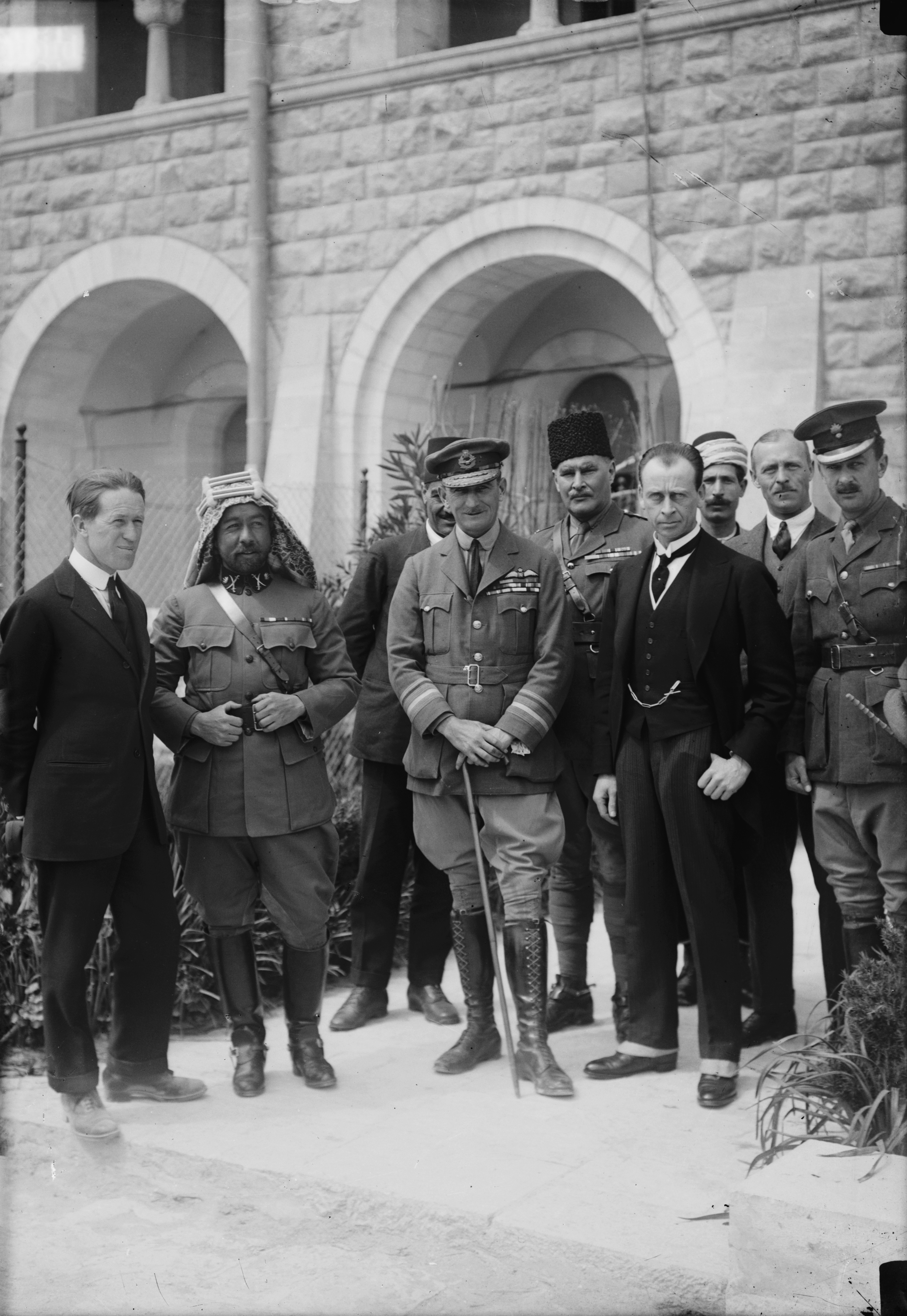
Front row, left to right: Col. T. E. Lawrence, Emir Abdullah, Air Marshal Sir Geoffrey Salmond and Sir Wyndham Deedes in Palestine

After the war he was posted to Istanbul, Turkey, as a military attaché. He was posted to Cairo, Egypt, which was at that time a British protectorate, as public security director. Here he helped to set up the Palestine Police Force.

From 1920 to 1922, Deedes served as Chief Secretary to the then British High Commissioner Sir Herbert Samuel in Palestine. Palestine was then under British mandate following the League of Nations decision in 1920 to hand it over to British control from 1923 onwards. Although Deedes had pro-Zionist sympathies, he played a role in promoting the Supreme Muslim Council as an Arab counterweight to the Jewish Agency. He retired from the British Army on 27 June 1923, with the honorary rank of Brigadier General. There is a street named after him in the Emek Refaim neighborhood of Jerusalem, Israel.

== Later life ==
Upon returning to England, Deedes did not take up his heritage as a country squire, but moved to London and chose to do unpaid social work in one of the poorest quarters of the city.

Between 1931 and the end of the Second World War in 1945, Deedes shared his house in Bethnal Green with his nephew William Deedes. During this time he became a councillor of the Metropolitan Borough of Bethnal Green, served on the education committee, and became chairman of the London Council of Social Service. He was also vice chairman of the National Council of Social Services.

When the London Turkish House (Halkevi) was set up during the Second World War to help foster Anglo-Turkish relations, Deedes was its chairman, with Lady Dorina Neave in charge of its social side. During the War, Deedes also became chief Air Raid Warden of his borough.

In 1946, severe illness forced him to retire from his work in the London East End. He returned to Hythe to live his years in a single room. In 1949, one year after the state of Israel was formed, he set up the Anglo-Israel Association.

He died on 2 September 1956.

== Personal life ==
Deedes was a strict Christian. He never married nor had any children. His older brother, Herbert William Deedes (born 27 October 1881), married Melesina Gladys Chenevix Trench on 3 July 1912. They had three children, with one of whom, William Deedes, he shared a home from 1931 to 1939.

== Translations ==
Deedes translated three major Turkish literary works into English: two novels by Reşat Nuri Güntekin and a memoir by Mahmut Makal:

- Reşat Nuri Güntekin. The Autobiography of a Turkish Girl (Çalıkuşu, 1922). London: George Allen & Unwin, 1949.
- Reşat Nuri Güntekin. Afternoon Sun (Akşam Güneşi, 1926). London: Heinemann, 1951.
- Mahmut Makal. A Village in Anatolia (Bizim Köy, 1950). London: Vallentine, Mitchell & Co., 1954.
