= Sir Thomas Neave, 2nd Baronet =

Sir Thomas Neave, 2nd Baronet (1761–1848) was an English merchant and banker, a planter and slave-owner on Montserrat, Nevis, St Kitts and Saint Vincent. He was elected a Fellow of the Royal Society in 1814.

== Life ==
He was born in St Benet Fink parish, London, the eldest son of Richard Neave and his wife Frances Bristow, daughter of John Bristow. From 1800 he was a name partner in the family firm Rich. & Thos. Neave, West Indies merchants, with premises in the Broad Street ward of London. It was a successor to Neave & Aislabie, merchants and governent contractors, in which a name partner had been his uncle James Neave (died 1794), with Rawson Aislabie (died 1806), father of Benjamin Aislabie. Already in 1789, Richard and Thomas Neave corresponded as London agents with Michael Keane on Saint Vincent.

Neave sold out a large holding in the Hudson's Bay Company in 1809, to Andrew Wedderburn. That year he was elected a Fellow of the Society of Antiquaries of London. In 1812 he was appointed a director of the Bank of England. In 1820 he was High Sheriff of Essex.

== Compensation claims ==
Neave was involved in 12 compensation claims under the Slave Compensation Act 1837, personally, as a trustee and as a mortgagee. He was successful in four personal claims, and was awarded "material amounts".

== Landowner, residences, legacy ==
"The Neaves put together one of the largest estates in south Essex", where Dagnams Park, the manor house, had been renovated by the 1st Baronet. The 2nd Baronet bought Gooshays manor, west of Dagnams. He built nearby St Thomas's Church, Noak Hill, as a memorial to his wife Frances and provided it with Early Modern painted window glass. The architect of the 1842 church was George Smith. The Neaves had bought stained glass in 1788 from the dealer John Christopher Hampp of Norwich, and the glass given to St Mary's Church, Prittlewell and St Gwenllwyfo's Church in Wales had the same source.

St Thomas Church, Noak Hill, 2014 photograph

In 1819 Neave bought the leased manorial rights to the western division of the Royal Liberty of Havering, from Richard Powlett-Wrighte. He was in possession of those only until 1828, when the Crown sold them to Hugh McIntosh.

Neave also had a Hampstead residence in Frognal, at the area later known as Oakhill Park. He purchased Branch Hill Lodge in 1799, from a younger son of Thomas Parker, 1st Earl of Macclesfield. He enlarged it, and displayed a glass collection there. In 1807 he bought 4 acres (1.6 ha) of Hampstead Heath. He sold Branch Hill Lodge; in 1816 it housed the family of Henry Thomas Colebrooke, and from 1817 was rented by Lady Byron.

From 1812 to 1835, Neave had a residence in central London, at 30 Old Burlington Street.

== Death ==
Sir Thomas Neave died at Dagnam Park on 11 April 1848, aged 87. He was a D.L. for Essex, and a lieutenancy commissioner for London.

== Family ==
Frances Neave, 1798 portrait

Neave married in 1791 Frances Caroline Digby (died 1835), daughter of William Digby. The couple had four sons and two daughters. The sons were:

- Richard Digby Neave (1793–1868), succeeded as 3rd Baronet
- Rev. Henry Lyttelton Neave (1796–1873)
- Sheffield Neave (1799–1868)
- William Augustus Neave (1802–1844)

Memorial to Charlotte Maria Neave, Père Lachaise Cemetery, Paris

The elder daughter Frances Caroline Neave died unmarried in 1860, at age 68. The younger daughter Charlotte Maria Neave had died in 1854.

In 1810 David Wilkie completed a group portrait "Family of Thomas Neave", with eight figures. His diary shows that the commission from Neave was from 1808. After a laborious process Wilkie went on 10 January 1810 to Hampstead, to work on the picture in Neave's coach; and "only succeeded in rubbing out a great deal of what I had formerly done"; the picture was done, on his account, on 30 January.
