= Six's technique =

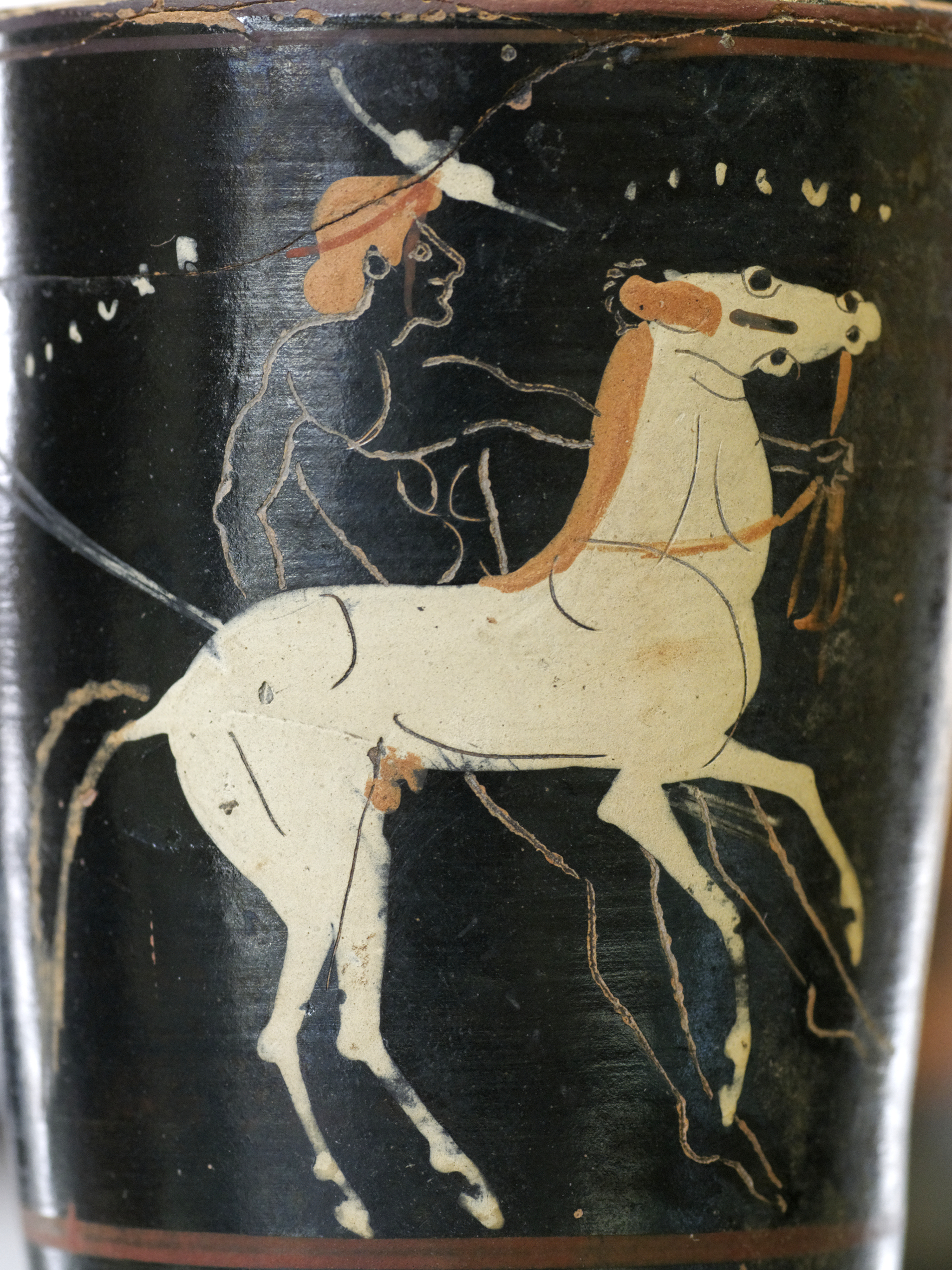
Lekythos in Six's technique, Cabinet des Médailles, Paris (De Ridder 493)

Six's technique is the modern name for a technique used by Attic black-figure vase painters that involves laying on figures in white or red on a black surface and incising the details so that the black shows through. It was first described by the Dutch scholar Jan Six in 1888, and was given its English name by J. D. Beazley.

Around 530 BCE, the technique began to be used regularly for decorating the whole vase, rather than for details as in previous practice. The effect is similar to red-figure painting. Nikosthenes, Psiax, and the Diosphos Painter were among the early users of the technique. It remained in use until the mid-5th century, when it can be observed on a small number of oenochoe from the Haimon painter workshop.

== See also ==
- Corpus vasorum antiquorum
