= Museum De Lakenhal =

Coordinates: 52°09′47″N 4°29′15″E

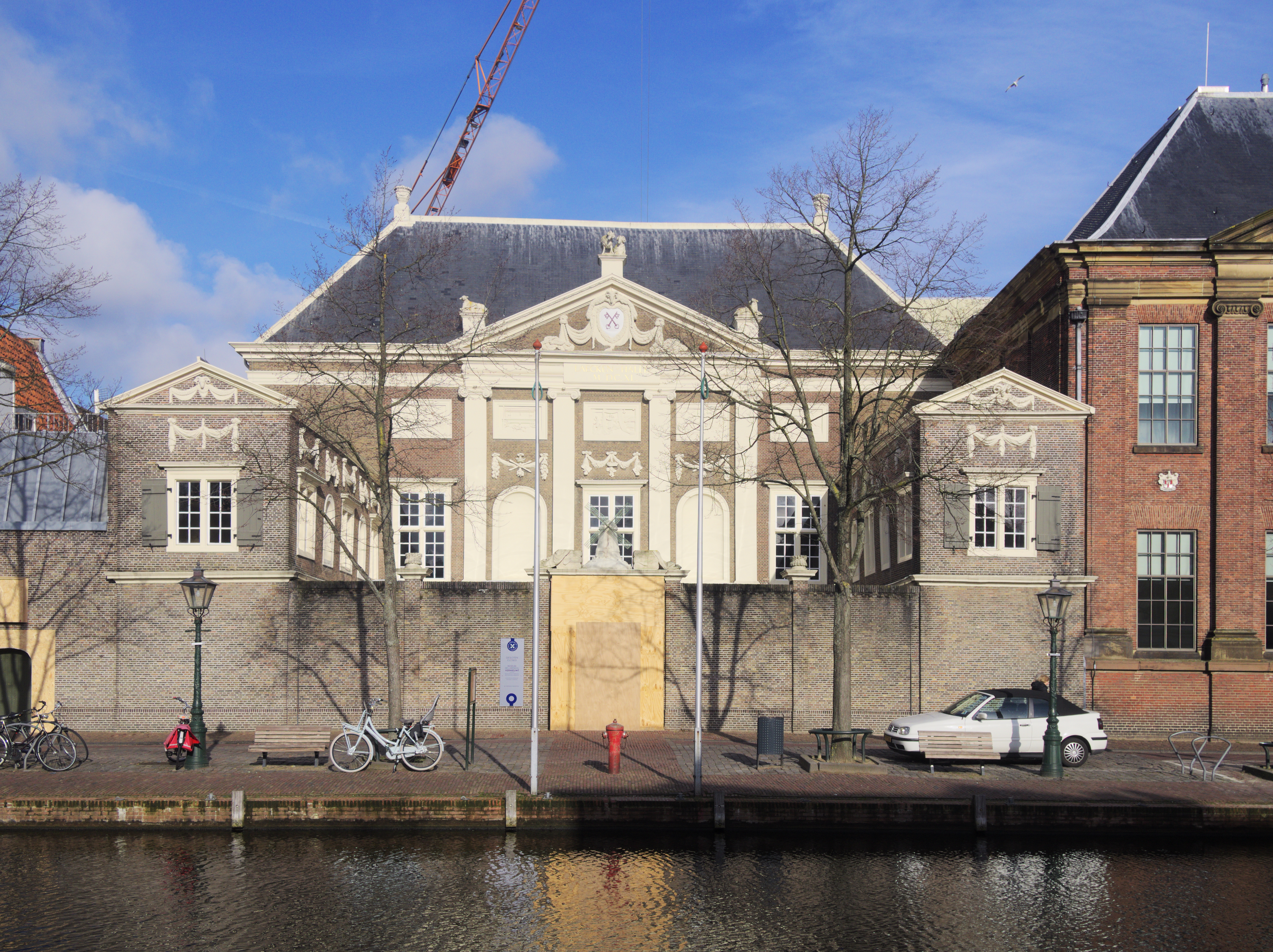
- Museum De Lakenhal in 2017

- Location in South Holland, Netherlands
- Established: 1874
- Location: Leiden, Netherlands
- Type: Art museum
- Website: www.lakenhal.nl

Museum De Lakenhal is the city museum of fine art and history in Leiden, Netherlands. Founded in 1874, its collection ranges from early works by Rembrandt van Rijn and Lucas van Leyden's Last Judgement to modern classics of De Stijl and artworks created by contemporary artists such as Claudy Jongstra, Atelier van Lieshout. One notable collection is that of fijnschilder paintings from the Dutch Golden Age. Besides its permanent collection, the museum runs temporary exhibitions and public events.

== History of the building ==
The museum building was erected in 1640 by Arent van 'Gravesande as a cloth hall (lakenhal in Dutch) – a guild hall for cloth merchants. The museum was founded in 1874 as a stedelijk museum (municipal museum). Since 1874, the space taken up by the museum has gradually grown. An exhibition hall was added at the end of the nineteenth century and a new wing in 1922. A complete (and prize-winning) renovation took place between 2016 and 2019, at a cost of around 19m euros.

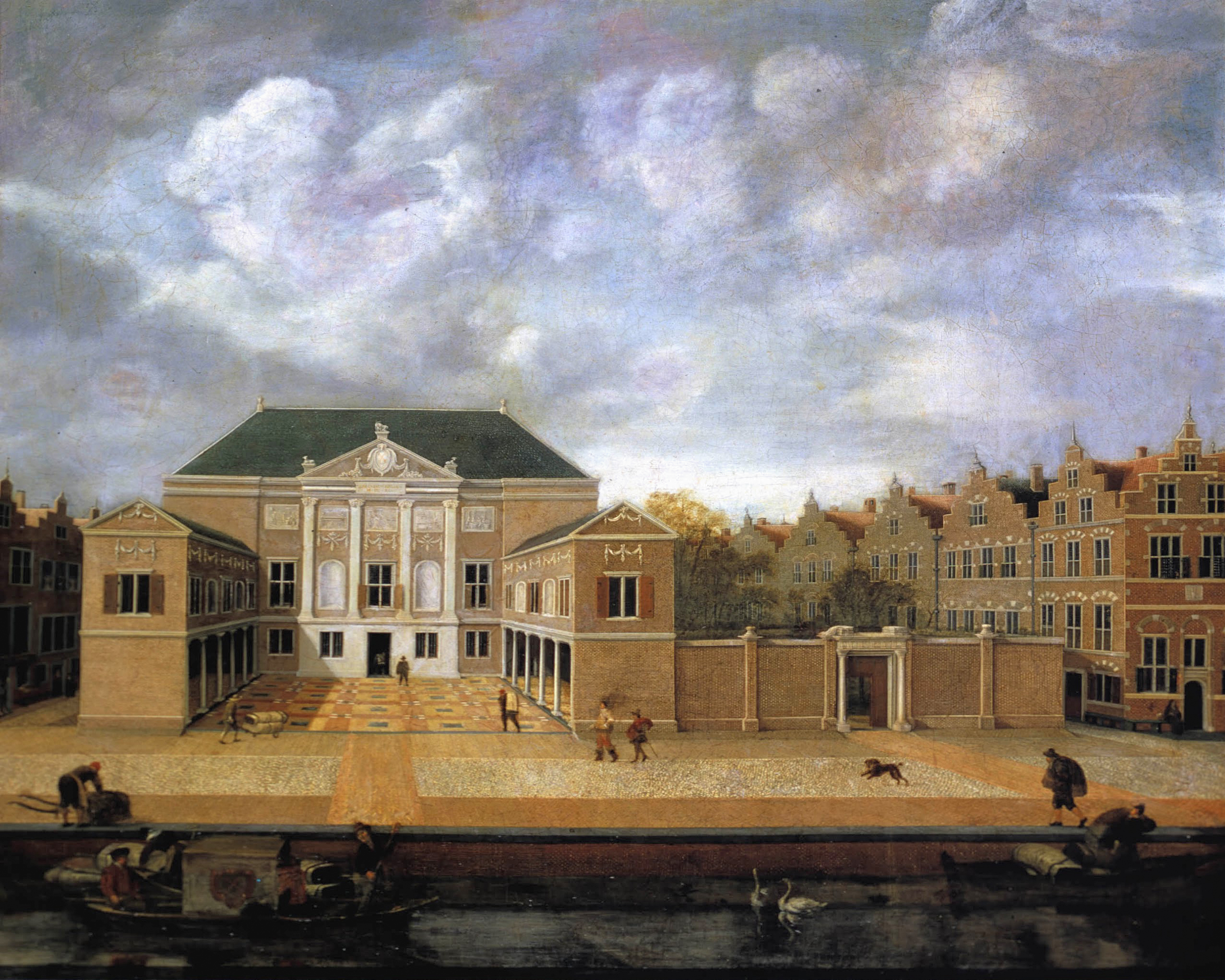
Museum entrance in the former Cloth Hall – 1642 painting by the Leiden architectural painter Susanna van Steenwijk. The eastern expansion had not yet been realized.

== Collections ==
Like other municipal museums in the Netherlands, the Lakenhal became a repository for municipal art collections. Artifacts from Leiden are on display, such as a series of stained glass windows by Willem Thibaut commissioned for the Leiden city hall, now installed in the stairwells.

On permanent display is also the old inspection room or Staalmeesterskamer, where cloth was inspected, and the meeting hall where disputes were decided. Four large paintings depicting the cloth industry by Isaac van Swanenburg hang in the same spots on the walls as designed. Similarly, a grand over-the-mantel piece by Carel de Moor shows the inspectors in a massive wooden frame decorated with their family shields, flanked by a series of three historical allegories of the city of Leiden by Abraham Lambertsz van den Tempel.

The museum hosts a collection of altarpieces and religious artifacts from before the Protestant Reformation that were formally ceded to the state in 1572. The museum also includes a reconstructed statie or Catholic mission station from after the Reformation. Because the Catholic religion was banned, there was no official church, and all of the Catholic places of worship in the young Dutch Republic were called mission stations. These were semi-hidden churches that were tolerated and taxed by the state.

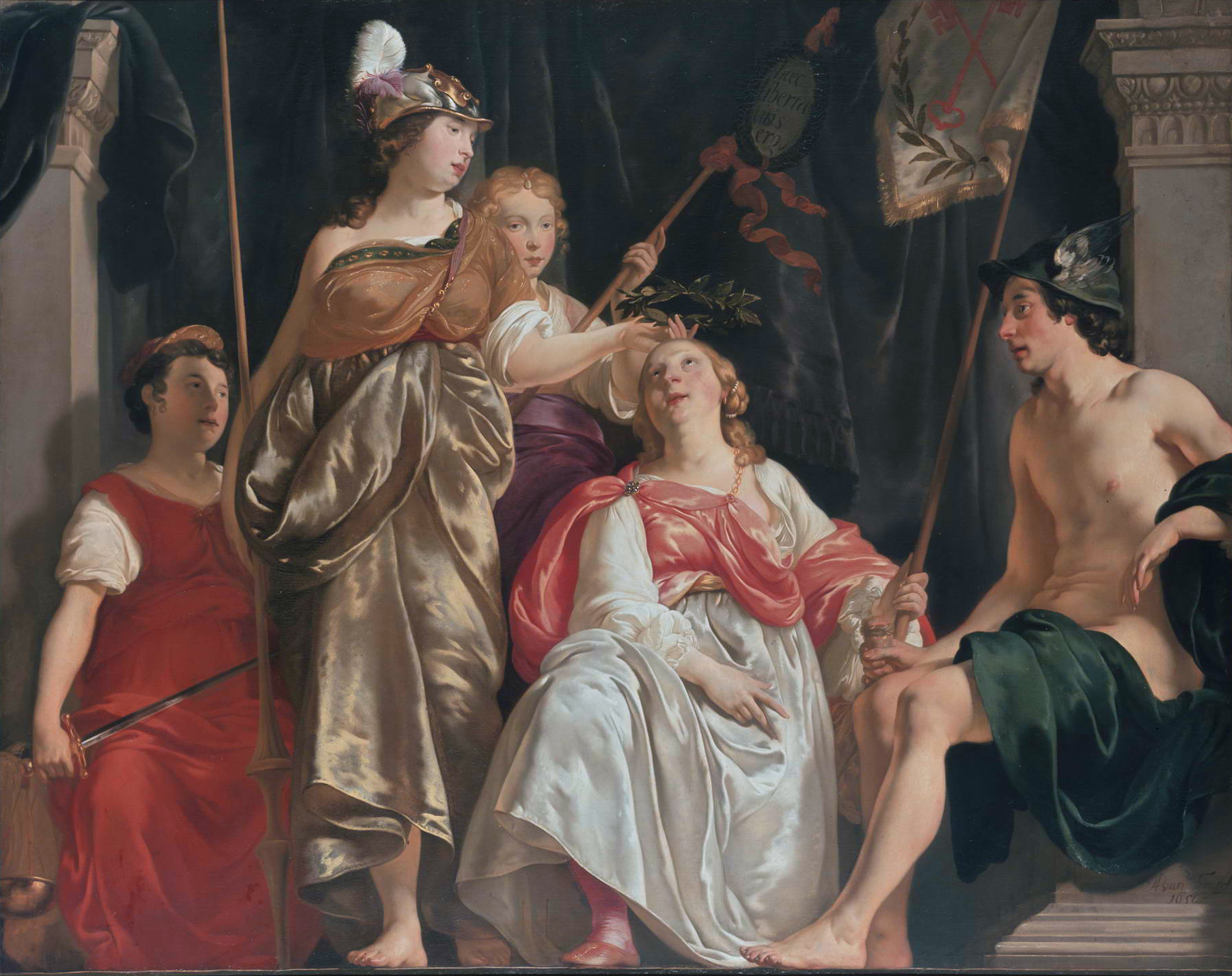
Minerva Crowns the Maid of Leiden, one of a series of three grand paintings for the Lakenhal in 1650 by Abraham Lambertsz van den Tempel

The collection also includes A Pedlar Selling Spectacles (Allegory of Sight), one of a series of five, The Senses, by Rembrandt.

The museum was closed for restoration and expansion from 2016 to 2019. On its reopening in June 2019, and until February 2020, the museum had on display a newly identified painting by Rembrandt, Suffer little children to come unto me, showing Jesus preaching.

In 2022 the museum acquired the film Planktonium (2021) by the Dutch filmmaker Jan van IJken as a video work; it was shown during Leiden's year as European City of Science.

== Organisation ==
The current director is Tanja Elstgeest. The museum's budget, as of 2021, is around 5m euros. 2021 saw 29,281 visitors, although that figure was affected by Covid-19 lockdowns.

== Gallery ==
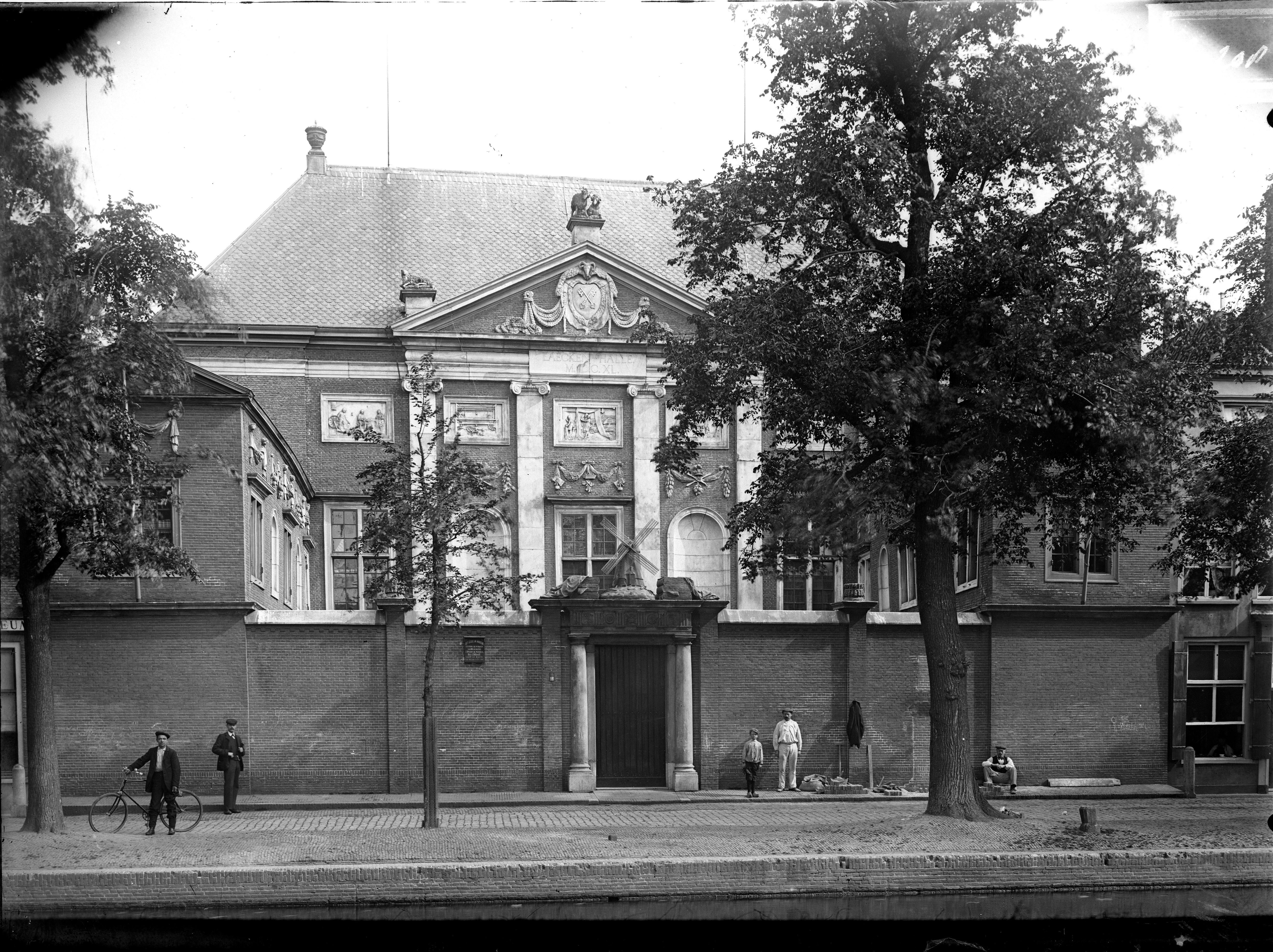
The Lakenhal Museum (19th century)

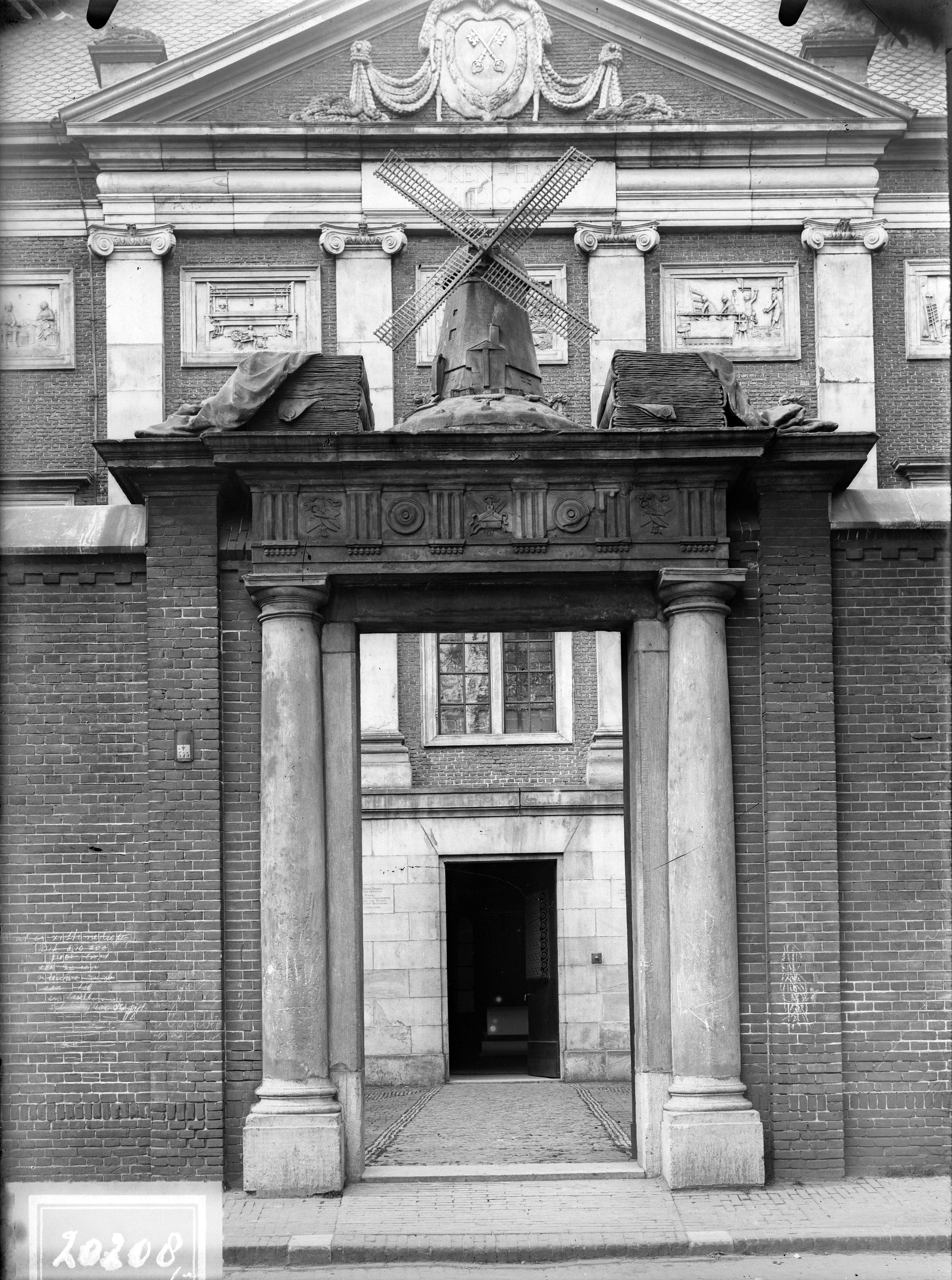
Entrance to the museum (19th century)

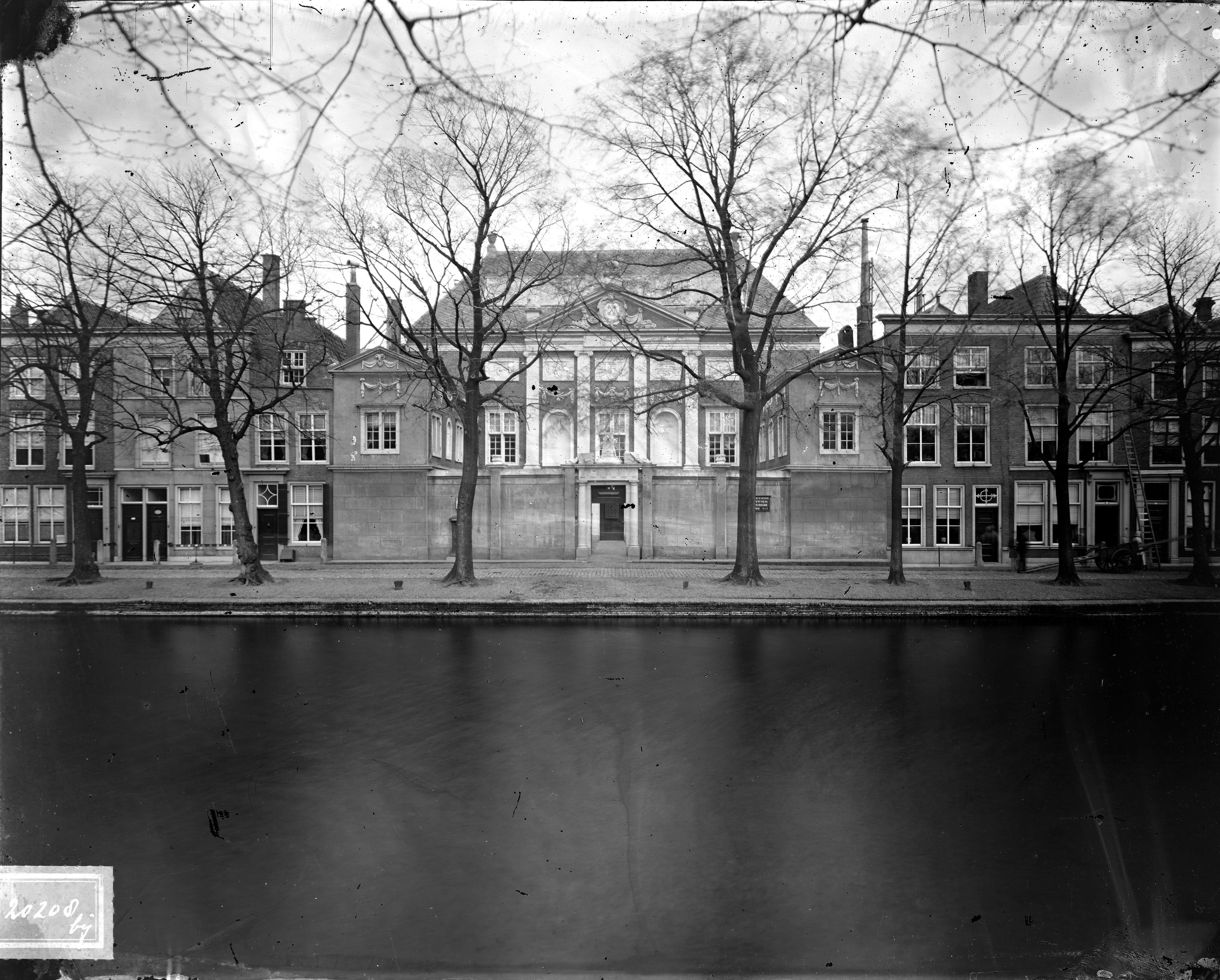
Lakenhal (19th century)
