= Dorina Neave =

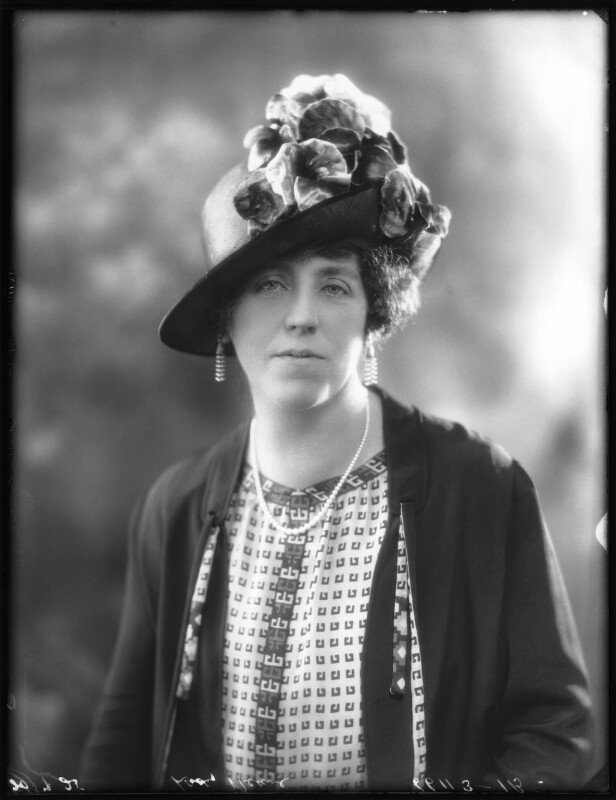
- Neave in 1925
- Born: Dorina Lockhart Clifton; 1880
- Died: 1955 (age 70–71)
- Resting place: St Thomas's Church, Noak Hill
- Spouse: Sir Thomas Neave, 5th Baronet
- Writing career
- Language: English

Dorina Lockhart Neave, Lady Neave (1880–1955) was an English writer. She authored three books about Turkey.

== Life ==
=== In Turkey ===
Born Dorina Lockhart Clifton, she was taken by her father, George H. Clifton, to the Ottoman Empire in her early years, as he worked for the Supreme Consular Court there. They resided in the "Edip Efendi Yali", one of the "water mansions" of Constantinople built on the shores of the Bosphorus in the Tulip period. She later wrote three books about her time in what became Turkey. Twenty-six Years on the Bosphorus (1933) and Romance of the Bosphorus (1949) – (a "literary classic") are reminiscences of her life in Constantinople during the reign of Sultan Abdul Hamid II (reigned 1876–1909), while Remembering Kut is an account of the devastating Siege of Kut (1915–1916) during the First World War on the Middle Eastern Front. A Turkish translation of Twenty-six Years on the Bosphorus was published in 1978, and another in 2008 in a series called "The Turks through the Eyes of the West". She spent her last summer in the Ottoman Empire in 1907, leaving on 26 August (her birthday) that year.

=== In Britain ===
Soon after returning to England, Dorina Clifton met her future husband, Sir Thomas Neave, 5th Baronet. After their marriage in November 1908, she settled with her husband at Dagnam Park, his house in Essex, with a second home in Anglesey, Llys Dulas Manor, slightly north of Dulas Bay.

She is well known for supposedly building the stone shelter on the island, Ynys Dulas, but this is mistaken, as she was born in 1880 and the tower dates from 1821. The tower is currently a listed building. It was built by the then owner of the Llys Dulas Estate, Colonel James Hughes. Neave's English country house was near Noak Hill, and she played a full role in the life of the village. She is remembered in Romford by the foundation stone of an extension to the Victoria Cottage Hospital in Pettits Lane, which she laid in the 1930s.

Sir Thomas Neave died in 1940. That winter, Dagnam Park was requisitioned for the use of the British Army. Some of Lady Neave's Turkish friends came to help her pack up her belongings. Her dower house (Dagnam Priory) and Llys Dulas had also been requisitioned, leaving her homeless. Fortunately, she was able to find a flat in Albany, Piccadilly. When Anthony Eden opened the Turkish House (Londra Türk Halkevi) in Fitzhardinge Street to foster Anglo-Turkish relations, he asked Lady Neave to help with it. Sir Wyndham Deedes, the Chairman of the Halkevi, asked her to undertake the social side of the Turkish House. The fortnightly Turkish Ladies' "At Homes" which she organized became a popular feature, attended by society ladies, representatives of all the British Armed Services and, when America came into the war, many of the officers and members of the American Embassy.

Lady Neave was the last of the landed gentry to live in Dagnam Park, before the policies of Britain's post-war Labour government constrained her to reside in her second home in Anglesey, owing to a compulsory purchase order made by the London County Council to take over Dagnam Park. This, however, would lead to the demise of the property and its eventual demolition in 1950. Many features of the estate are only remembered via Lady Neave's memoirs, including a bathing pool which locals originally believed to be a fish pond. The Neaves sold Llys Dulas in the early 1950s, and Lady Neave is buried in the cemetery at St Thomas's Church, Noak Hill. Dorina Neave – a breed of rose – is named after her.

== Publications ==
- Twenty-six Years on the Bosphorus. London: Grayson & Grayson, 1933.
- Remembering Kut: "Lest We Forget". London: Arthur Barker, 1937.
- Romance of the Bosphorus: Reminiscences of Life in Turkey. London: Hutchinson, 1949.
