= Suffer little children to come unto me =

Early painting by Rembrandt

- Let the Little Children Come to Me
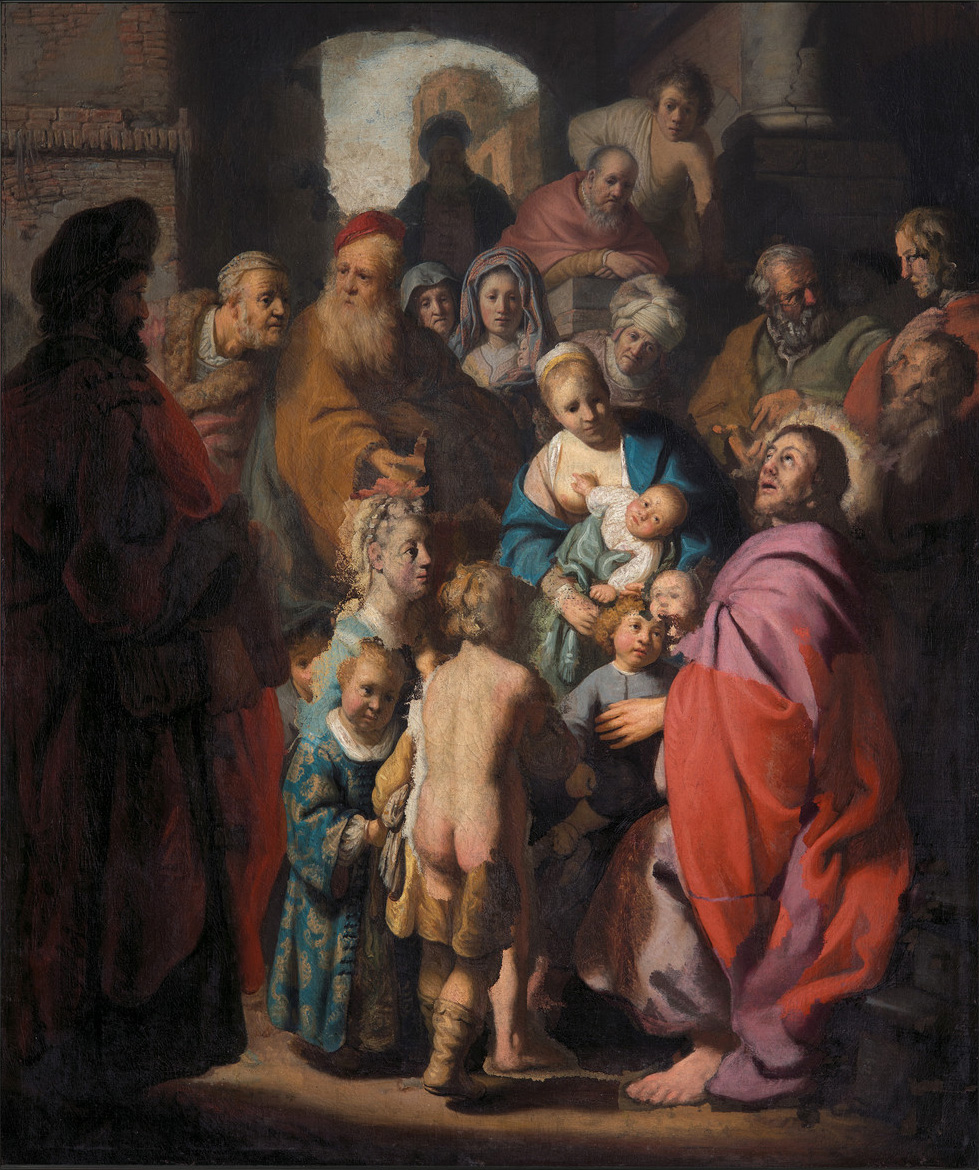
- Artist: Rembrandt
- Year: 1620s
- Dimensions: 122 cm (48 in) × 104 cm (41 in)

Suffer little children to come unto me, also known as Let the Little Children Come to Me, is an early seventeenth-century painting by the Dutch painter Rembrandt. The subject of the painting is the teaching of Jesus about little children, and it has been dated to Rembrandt’s Leiden period, around 1627.

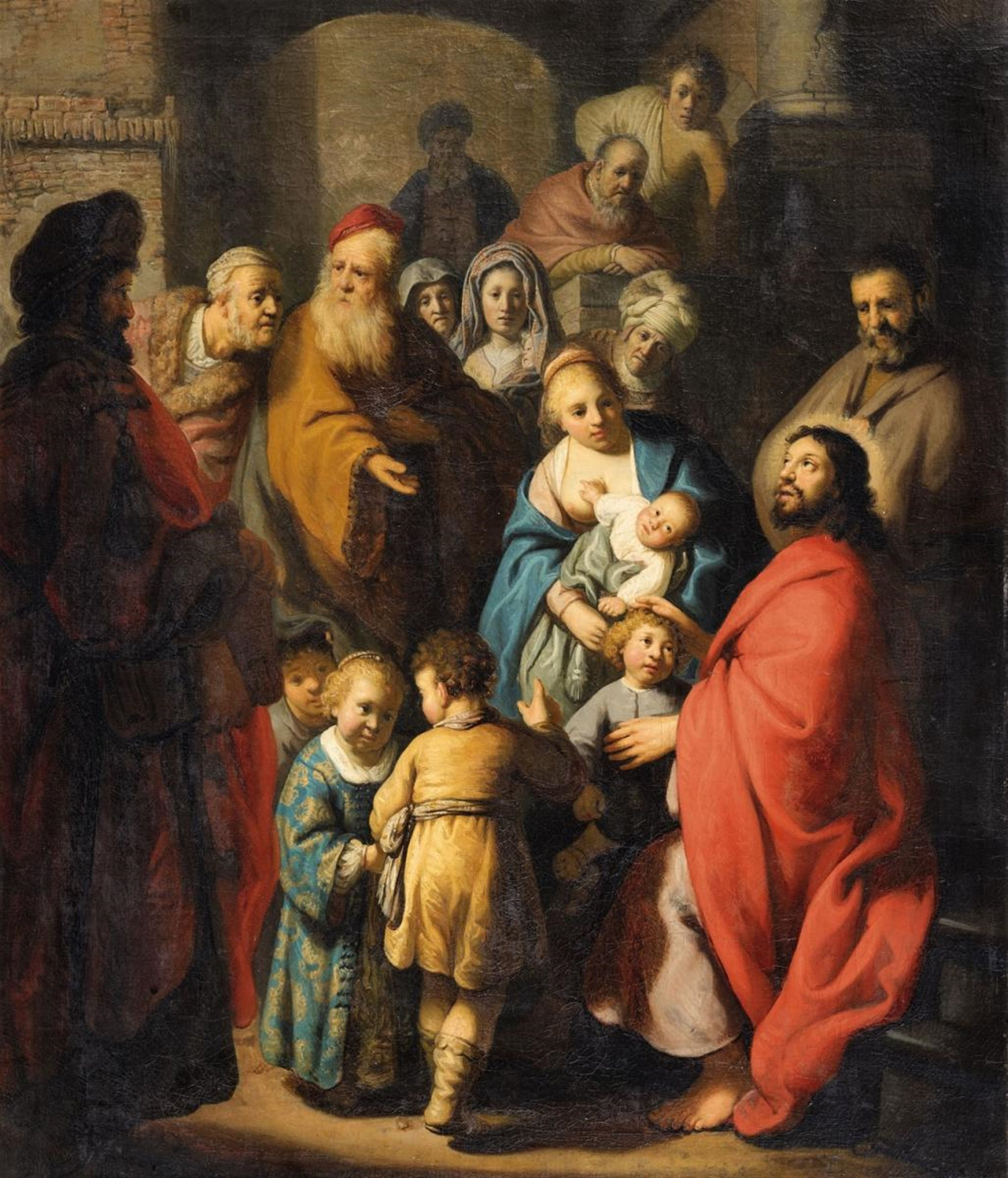
The painting as it appeared in 2014, before restoration

== History ==
The painting - an oil on canvas - came to public attention after appearing at auction at Lempertz, Cologne, on 17 May 2014, where it was catalogued as ‘‘Netherlandish School, mid-17th century’’ and sold for €1,508,000 including premium.

Amsterdam art dealer Jan Six is credited with recognising the painting as an early work by Rembrandt, having identified a young man in the background—the figure in white at the upper right—as a self-portrait of the artist. The painting was later attributed to Rembrandt and dated to his Leiden period. It was authenticated by several specialists, including the Ashmolean's Christopher Brown.

At the time of the sale, the painting included extensive later overpainting, which was subsequently removed during restoration. Among other alterations, the overpainting covered up a naked child in the foreground, and replaced the turban of a man at centre-left with a Dutch soft cap. Art historian Andrew Graham-Dixon connects the painting's subject matter, and the presence of people in non-European dress in the crowd, with the influx of refugees to Leiden in 1626 fleeing the Thirty Years' War. The painting was not completely finished when the overpainting took place, and Christiaan Vogelaar suggested some of the finishing may have been done by Claes Corneliszoon Moeyaert.

The face of the man under the archway at the back of the painting, and the woman looking out from between two other figures, were modelled on Rembrandt's father and mother.

The painting was included in the exhibition Young Rembrandt, held at Museum De Lakenhal, Leiden (from 2 November 2019), and the Ashmolean Museum, Oxford (27 February – 7 June 2020).

In 2026 Sotheby's announced the painting would be auctioned on 1 July that year, and estimated its likely price as between eight and twelve million pounds.
