= Portrait of Petronella Buys =

1635 painting by Rembrandt

- Portrait of Petronella Buys (1605–1670)
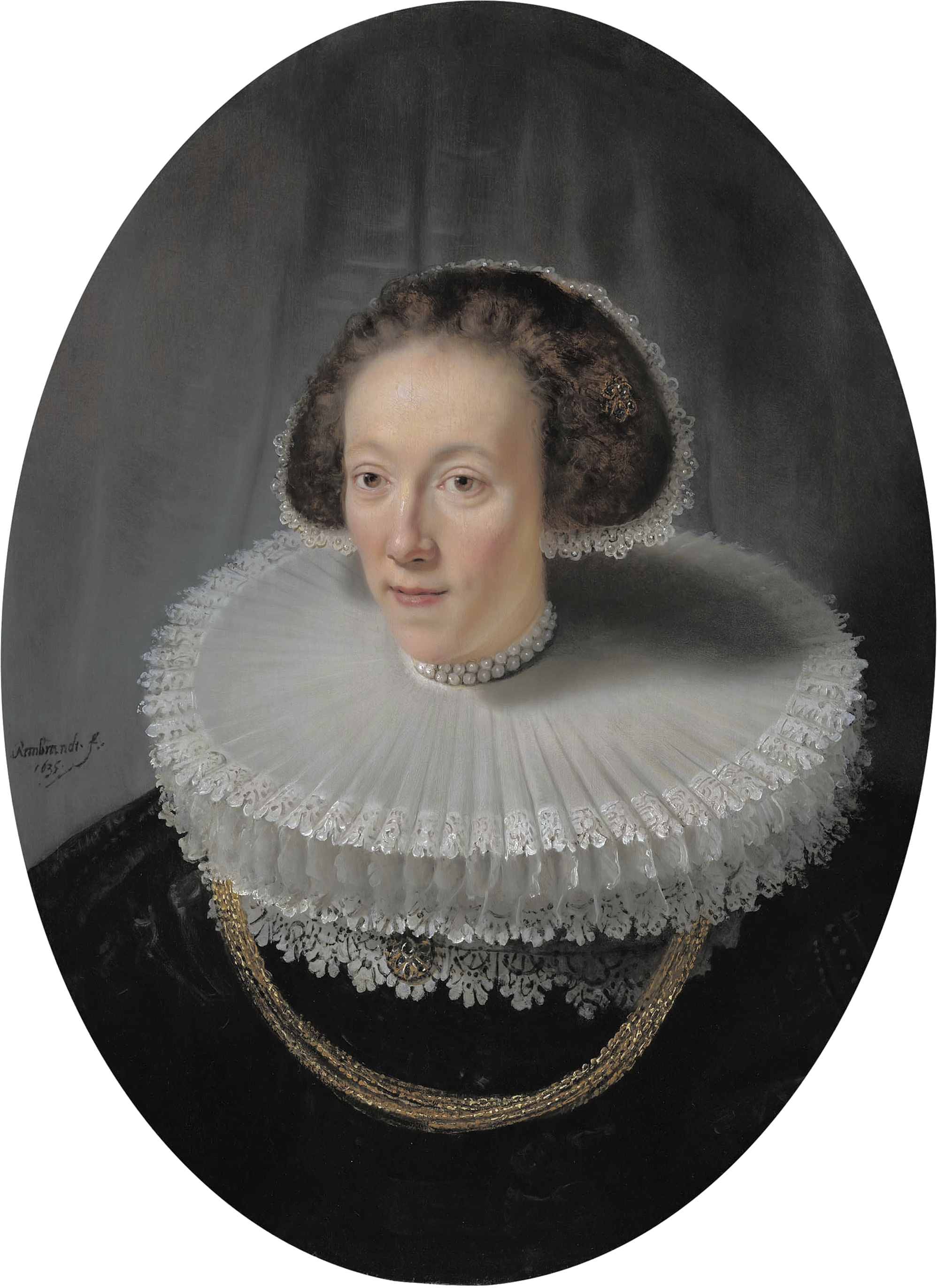
- Year: 1635
- Medium: oil paint, oak panel
- Dimensions: 79, 79.5 cm (31.1, 31.3 in) × 58.5, 59.3 cm (23.0, 23.3 in)
- Owner: Charles Sedelmeyer, Adrian John Hope, Emilie Mélanie Mathilde Rapp
- Accession: RR-115

Portrait of Petronella Buys (1610–1670) is a 1635 portrait painting painted by Rembrandt and his workshop. It shows a young woman with a very large and impressive millstone collar. It was in a private collection.

== Description ==
Several oval portraits of a woman of 17th-century Amsterdam have survived, and sometimes these were pendants and sometimes they were individual portraits. This painting, with its pendant, has been attributed to Rembrandt since the 19th century, though this attribution was called into question by Bob Haak and subsequently rejected by the Rembrandt Research Project in 1989. This painting was painted as a wedding pendant, but was left in the collection of the couple's family after the couple traveled to the East Indies.

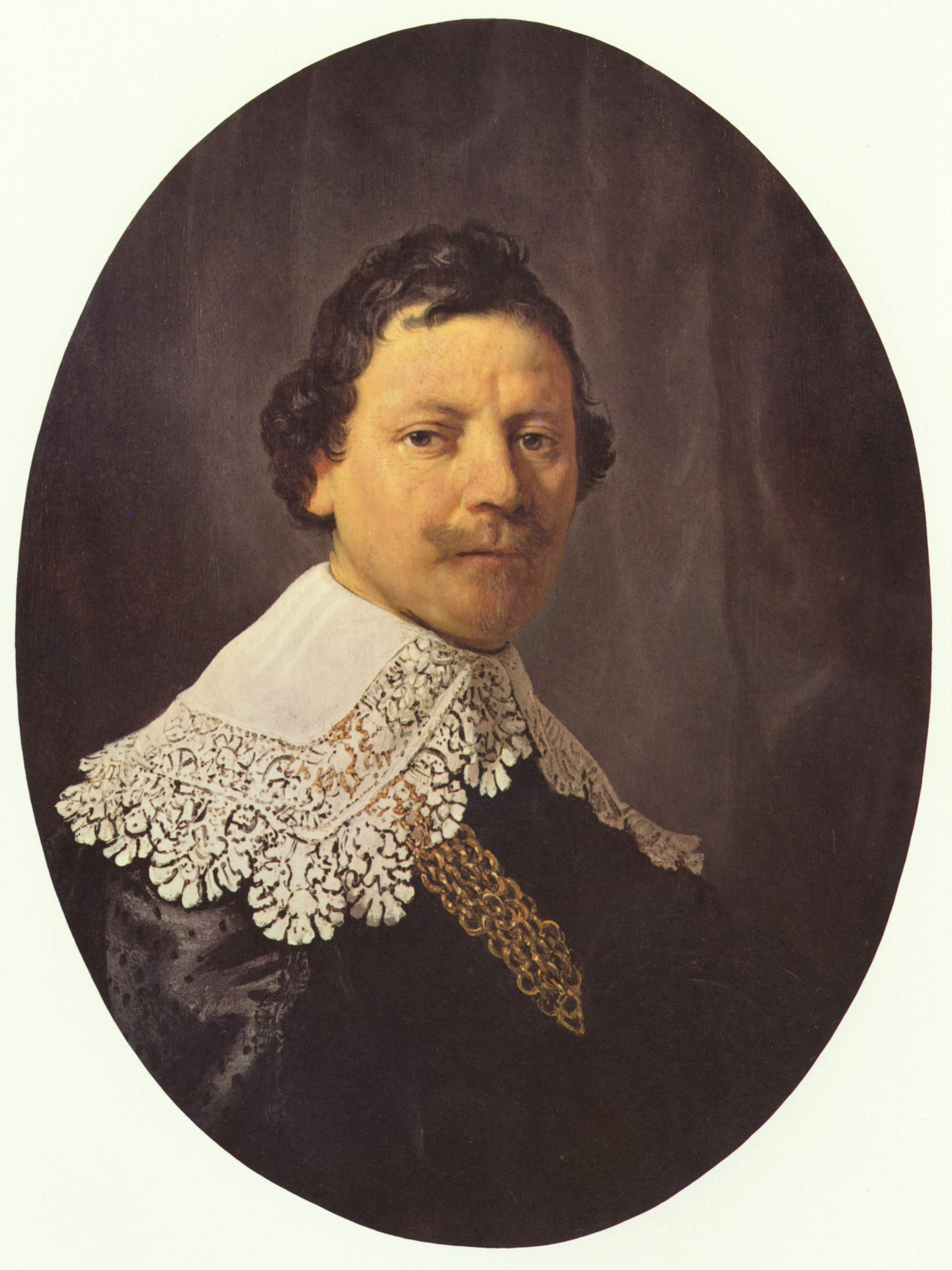
HdG nr. 660

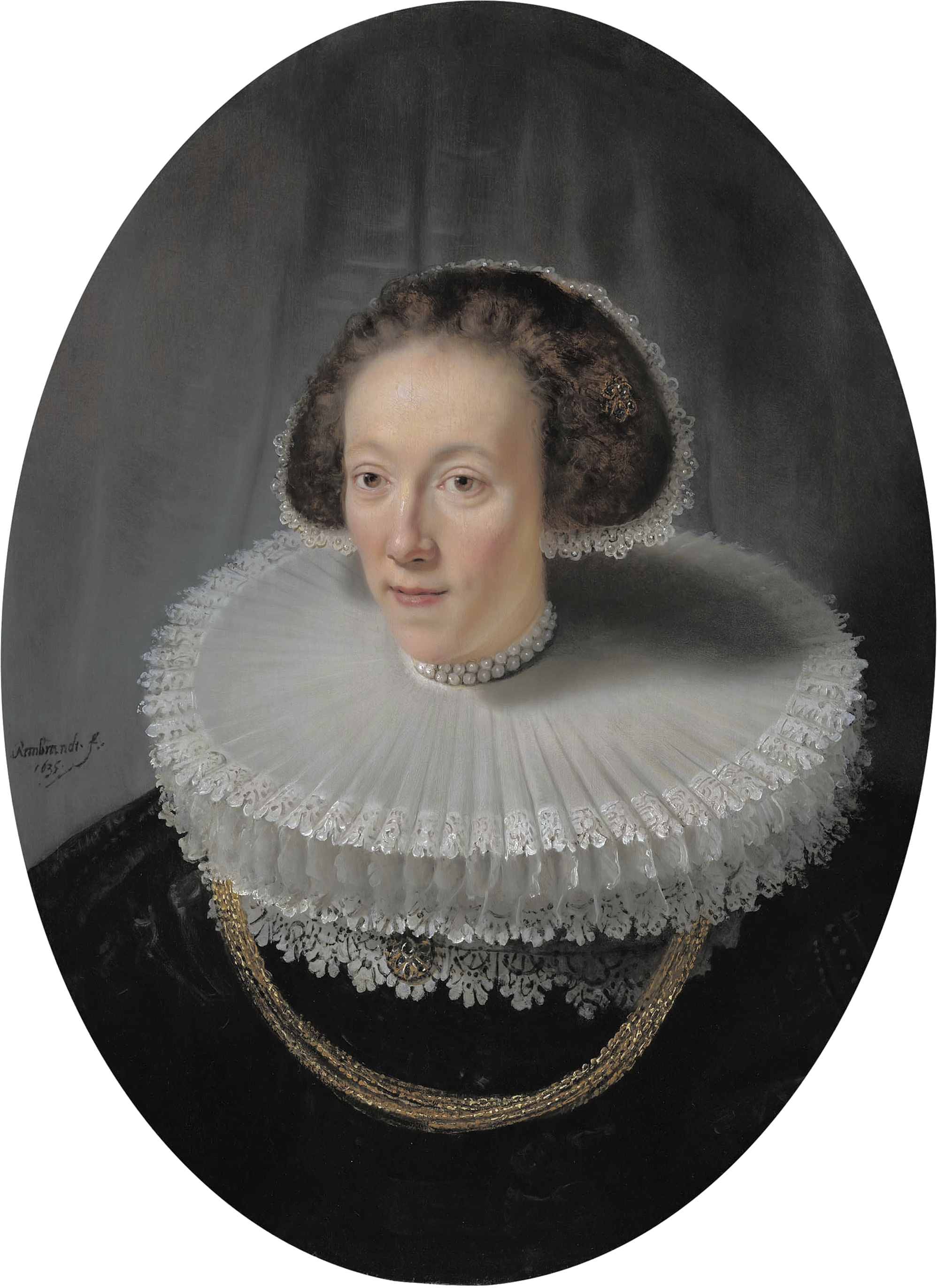
HdG nr. 661

This painting was documented by Hofstede de Groot in 1914, who wrote:

661. PETRONELLA BUYS (about 1605–1670), wife of Philips Lucasz. Sm. 497; Bode 216; Dut. 263, 272; Wb. 200, 458; B.-HdG. 118. Half-length, without hands; life size. About thirty. She is turned a little to the left, and looks with a friendly smile at the spectator. She wears a black gown with a gold chain of several narrow strands, a ruff trimmed with lace, and under this a second lace collar, close-fitting, with a rosette at her bosom. In her chestnut hair is a diamond clasp. The small cap on the back of her head is held in place by a hoop set with pearls. Round her neck is a double string of pearls. Full daylight enters from the left. Light grey background. [Pendant to 660.]

On the back is inscribed, "Jonchvr. petronella Buys: syne Huysvr. naer dato getrout aen de Hr: Borgermr. Cardon." Signed on the left above the shoulder, "Rembrandt f. 1635"; oval oak panel, 30 inches by 23 inches. Mentioned by Bode, p. 405; Dutuit, p. 45; Michel, p. 558 [433]; Hofstede de Groot, Oud Holland, xxxi. (1913), p. 236. Exhibited at Leyden, 1906, No. 49.

Sales. C. S. Roos, Amsterdam, August 28, 1820, No. 85 (180 florins, Engelberts).

- C. E. Vaillant and J. Sargenton, Amsterdam, April 19, 1830, No. 74 (540 florins, Roos).
- In the possession of the Amsterdam dealer Roos, 1836 (who priced it at 500 florins), according to Sm.

Sale. Adrian Hope, London, June 30, 1894, No. 56 (^1365).

- In the possession of C. Sedelmeyer, Paris, "Catalogue of 300 Paintings," 1898, No. 126.
- In the possession of M. Knoedler and Co., New York.
- In the collection of Joseph Jefferson, New York.
- In the possession of A. Preyer, The Hague.
- In the possession of F. Kleinberger, Paris.
- In the collection of A. de Ridder, Cronberg.
- In the collection of M. van Gelder, Uccle, Brussels.

== Sitter ==
In 2017 the portrait was sold at Christie's in London as a Rembrandt portrait of the wife of Philips Lucasz, whom the bride had met a few years earlier in Batavia where Philip was based with the Dutch East India Company (V.O.C.). Petronella had travelled there in 1629 with her sister Maria Odilia Buys and her husband Jacques Specx, also employed by the V.O.C. In 1633 Philips and Petronella married shortly after their arrival back in Holland on 4 August 1634 at The Hague. They returned together to the East Indies on 2 May 1635, but Petronella was widowed six years later. She immediately returned to the Netherlands and made a home on the Keizersgracht in Amsterdam, and on 21 December 1645 she married in Amsterdam with her second husband Johan Cardon, Mayor of Vlissingen and director of the V.O.C. She died on 26 September 1670 in Vlissingen. The painting was probably a gift from the bride to her sister, as a way to remember her after she left for the Indies. The sister and brother-in-law of Petronella:

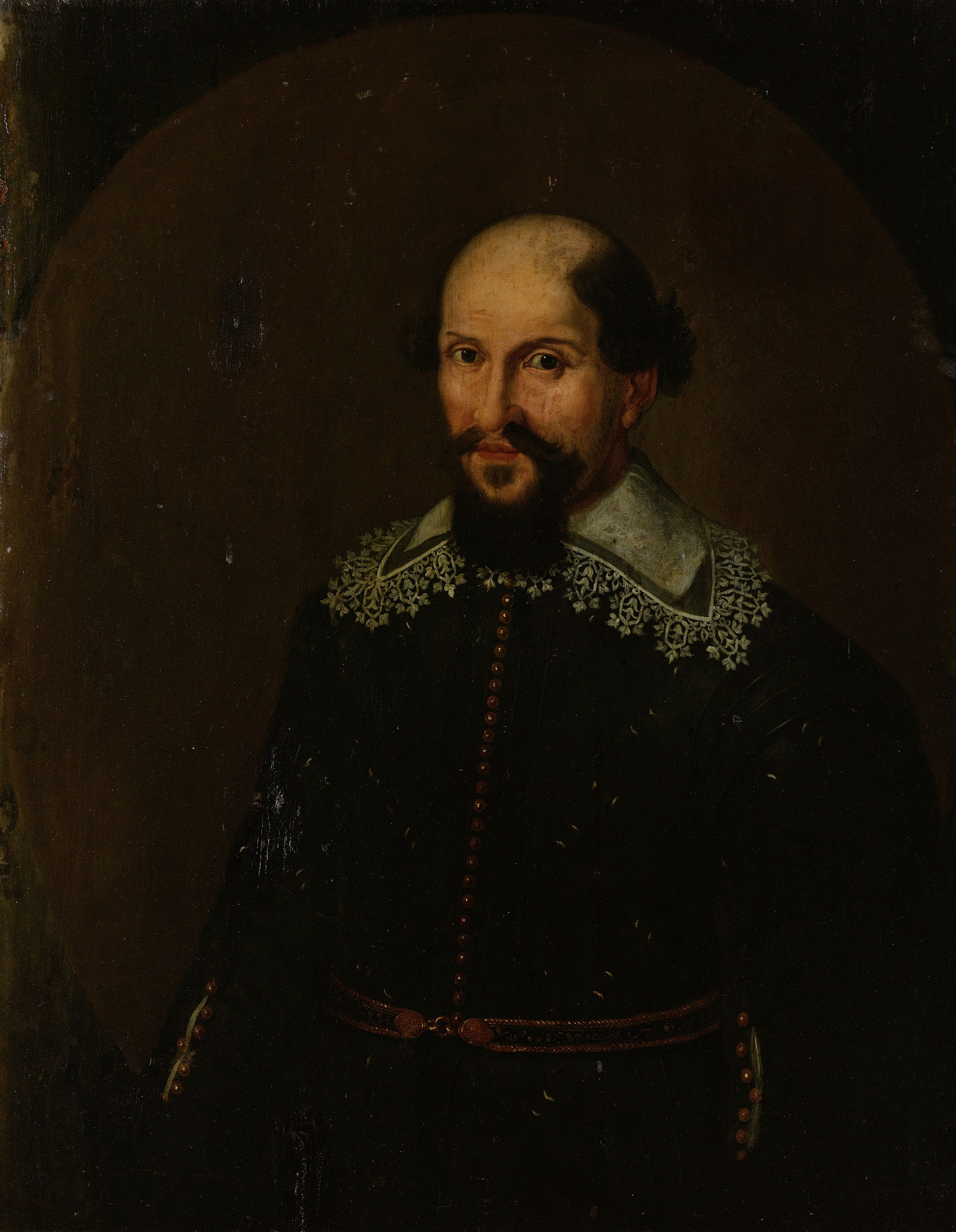
Jacques Specx (copy from a reversed engraving)

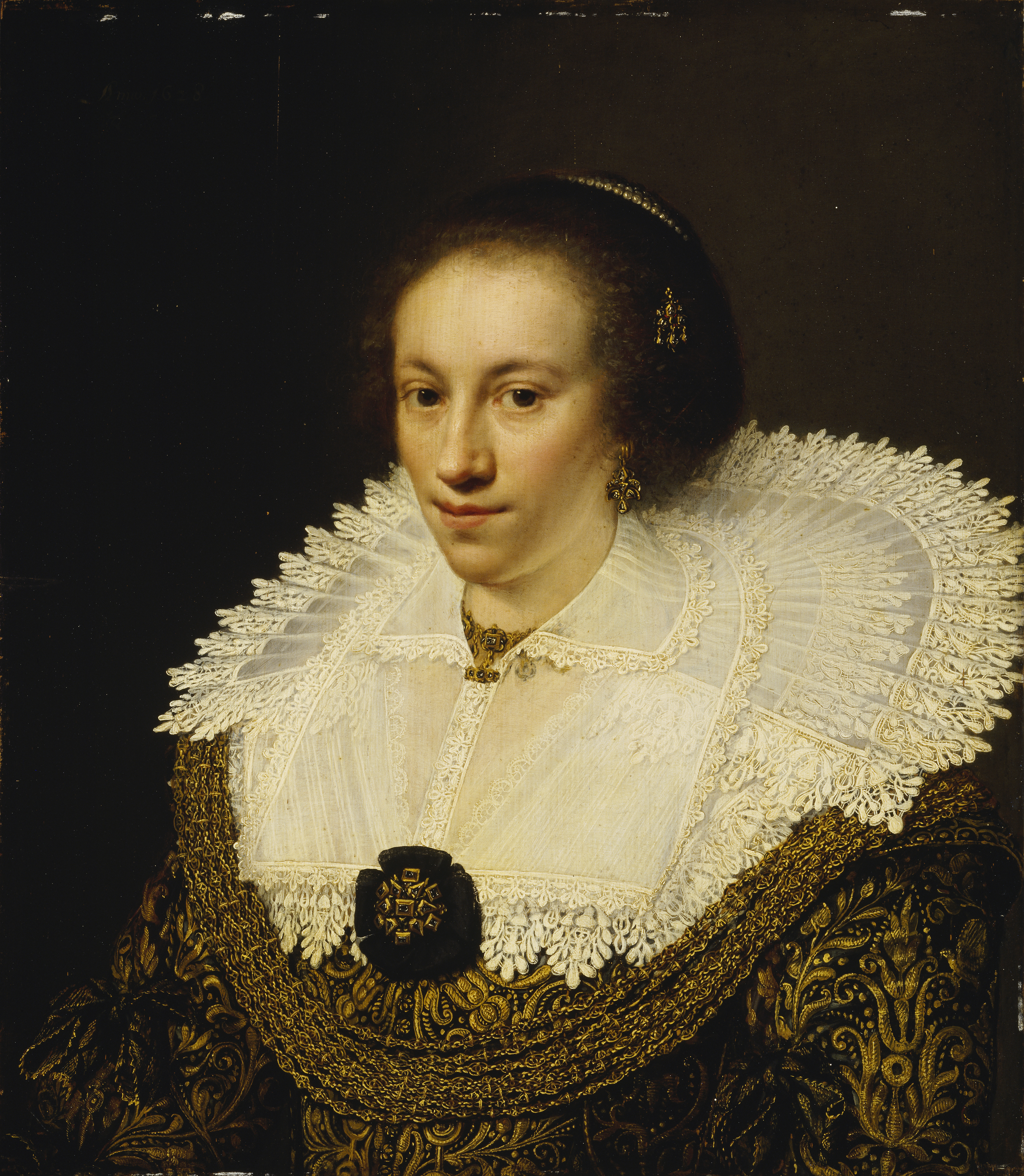
Maria Odilia Buys by Jan van Ravesteyn

This painting is one of the few Rembrandt paintings to have a 17th-century provenance, though it lacks a continuous 18th-century provenance. The painting remained in the Specx family, documented as being in the collection of their daughter Maria in 1655. It is then next documented as being sold from the collection of the art dealer C.S. Roos in 1820, whose son C.F. Roos continued the dealership and bought it back in 1830. It was exhibited in the collection of the art dealer Katz in 1938 and was subsequently in the collections of André Meyer and Wildenstein & Co. In 2017 it was sold from the divided estate of Paul-Louis Weiller for GBP 3,368,750.

== See also ==
- List of paintings by Rembrandt
