= Portrait of Jan Six =

1654 painting by Rembrandt

- Portrait of Jan Six aged 36
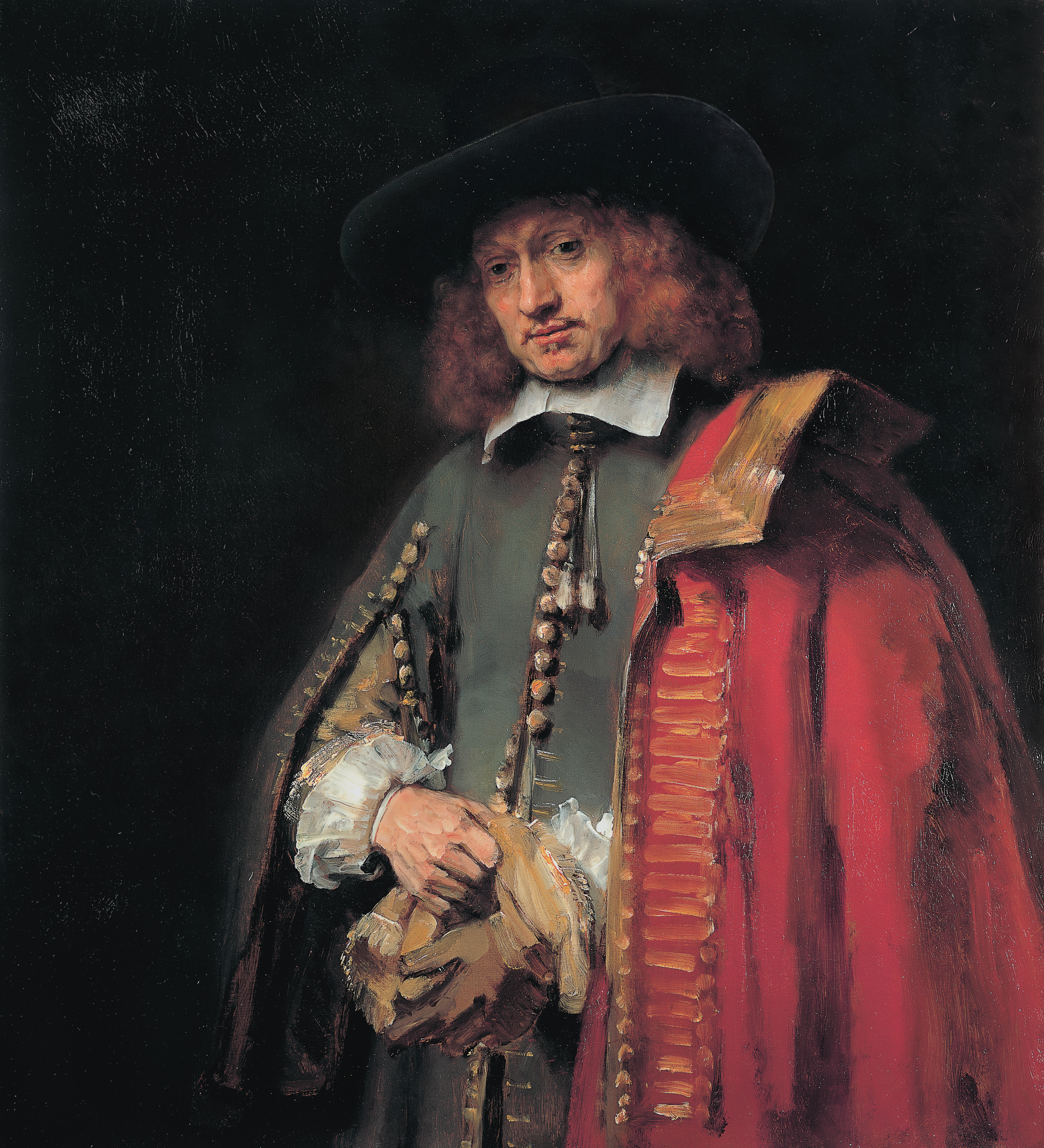
- Artist: Rembrandt
- Year: 1654
- Medium: oil paint, canvas
- Dimensions: 112 cm (44 in) × 102 cm (40 in)
- Location: Netherlands
- Accession: CS00070-000

Portrait of Jan Six is a 1654 oil-on-canvas painting by the Dutch painter Rembrandt van Rijn. Having been handed down many generations, via the direct descendants of the portrait's subject, Jan Six, the work remains in the Six Collection in Amsterdam.

== Description ==
This painting was documented by Hofstede de Groot in 1915, who wrote:

712. JAN SIX (1618-1700). Sm. 329; Bode 6; Dut. 228; Wb. 348; B.-HdG. 371. More than half-length; life size. He stands, seen in full face, turned slightly to the left with his head bent over a little on the right shoulder, and looks straight out of the picture. He is about to go out; he has put his large black felt hat on his long fair reddish hair, and with the right hand, which holds one glove, he draws the other glove on to his left hand. He wears a light grey coat with yellow buttons; over the left shoulder hangs a short bright red cloak with a collar and trimmings of gold lace. He has a plain collar and pleated wristbands. Dark grey background. The light falls from the left at the top of the whole figure. Painted in 1654. The date is known from the couplet written by J. Six himself:

AonlDas qVI sVM tenerls VeneratVs ab annls
TaLIs ego lanVs SIXIVs ora tVLI.

The sum of the capitals, M, D, L, X, V, I, gives the date 1654. Canvas, 44 1/2 inches by 40 1/2 inches. Engraved by J. W. Kaiser. Etched by P. J. Arendzen; by W. Steelink in Van Someren, Oude Kunst in Nederland; by Desboutin. Mentioned by Vosmaer, pp. 273, 556; Bode, pp. 532, 558; Dutuit, p. 54; Michel, pp. 452, 565 [351-3, 440]; Hofstede de Groot, Urkunden, No. 151; Professor Jan Six, Oud Holland, xi. (1893), p. 156; Moes, No. 7228, 4. Exhibited at Amsterdam, 1872, and 1900, No. 127. Painted for the sitter, and since preserved in his family. In the collection of J. Six, Amsterdam.

Hofstede de Groot also mentioned this painting in his introduction as one of the six finest portraits made by Rembrandt:

When Rembrandt had become one of the most famous painters of his century – as Orlers says as early as 1641 – and people had to stoop to entreaty if they would be painted by him, he could impose his own terms instead of having them dictated by others. He could light his models in the way that seemed to him most beautiful; he could adorn them in the manner that he thought appropriate to their character, indicate to them the best pose to take, and determine the degree of finish in the execution. Free from all external hindrances, he could then create; he no longer aimed at securing so exact a likeness of his sitter. Thus there came into existence masterpieces such as the portraits of the married couples in the collection of the Duke of Westminster (748 and 864) and the Metropolitan Museum, New York, formerly in the collection of B. Altman (755 and 869), the "Nicolaes Bruyningh" at Cassel (628), and above all the "Jan Six" at Amsterdam (712), perhaps the finest and most expressive of all.

== See also ==
- List of paintings by Rembrandt
- Rembrandt

== Sources ==
- Six collection — website.
