= Jan Six =

Dutch politician (1618–1700)

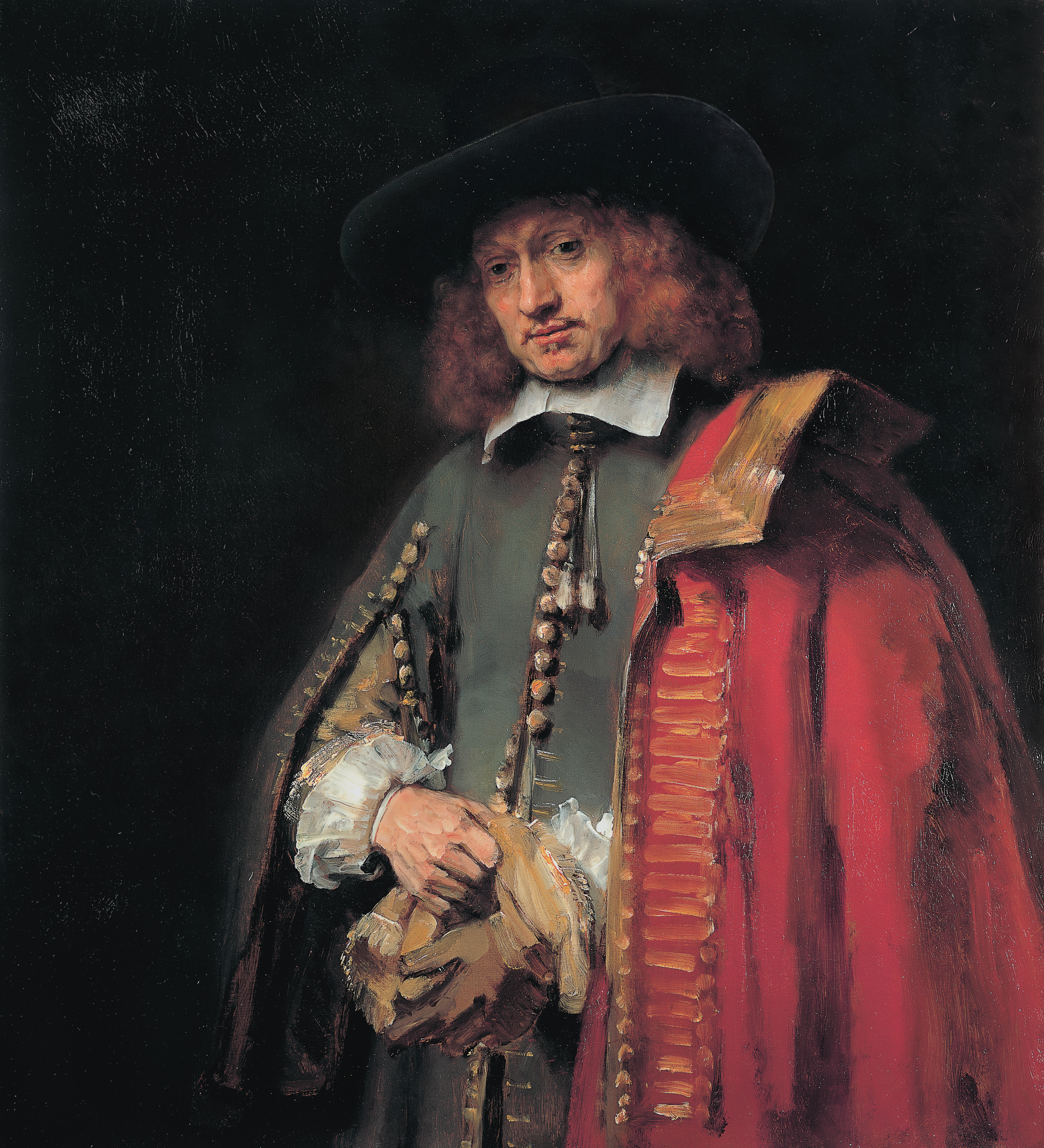
Portrait of Jan Six by Rembrandt (1654)

Jan Six (14 January 1618, Amsterdam – 28 May 1700, Amsterdam) was an important cultural figure in the Dutch Golden Age.

== Biography ==
From a well-to-do cloth merchant family Six (family name), Jan Six was the son of Jean T. A. Six (1575–1617) and his wife Anna Wijmer (1584–1654). His father died two months before Jan was born.

Jan studied liberal arts and law in Leiden in 1634. He became the son-in-law of the mayor of Amsterdam, Nicolaes Tulp, in 1655, when he married Tulp's daughter Margaretha. Thanks to his father-in-law, he became magistrate of family law and various other appointments on the city council, eventually becoming mayor of Amsterdam himself in 1691, aged 73.

Six was good friends with the poet Joost van den Vondel and the painter Rembrandt van Rijn, during the forties. Rembrandt depicted Six in the Portrait of Jan Six, and in the etching of the same title. Six remained a devotee of the arts all his life and wrote plays himself, the most famous being Medea, published in 1648 (with an etching by Rembrandt), and Onschult (Innocence) in 1662. In the same year the Dutch translation of Baldassarre Castiglione's Il libro del Cortegiano was dedicated to Six.

== Six Collection ==
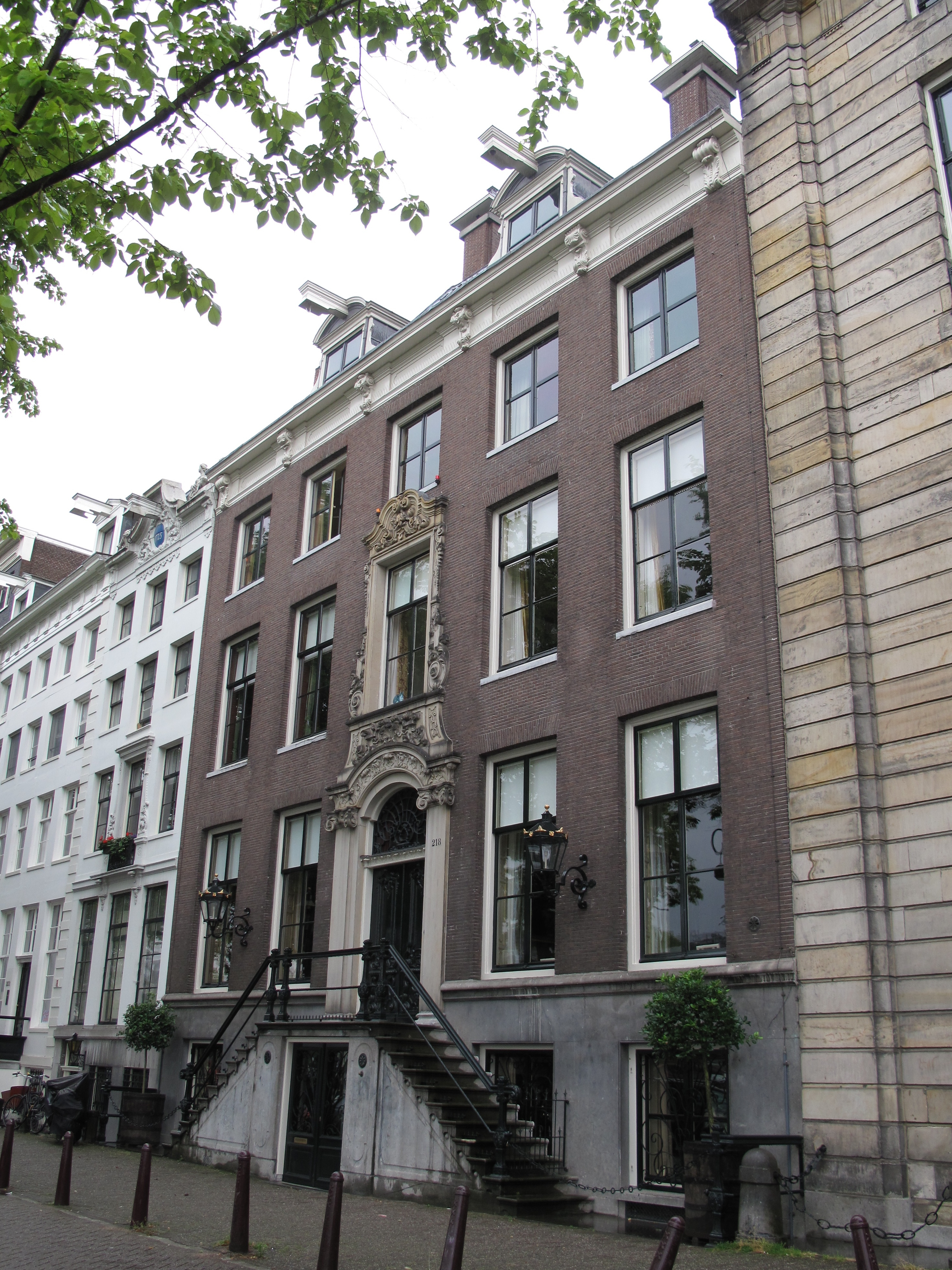
Home of the Six Collection, Amsterdam

His collection of paintings, drawings, etchings, and other artefacts (including many from his wife's family) were popular in his lifetime. This collection was eventually handed down generations later to the couple Lucretia Johanna van Winter (1785–1845) and Hendrik Six (1790–1847) whose extensive art collections were combined when they married in 1822 and are known collectively as the Six Collection, though 171 paintings were from the Van Winter family. Among the 76 Van Winter paintings collected by Lucretia Jans herself included a flower painting by Rachel Ruysch that she bought in 1820, The Milkmaid by Vermeer and the Serenade by Judith Leyster. The 171 paintings that Lucretia Jans took with her on her marriage, were only half of her father's extensive collection that itself had been known and put on display for a half century. The other half went to her sister Anna Louisa, who married Willem van Loon. A few of those paintings can still be seen in Museum Van Loon, but the rest of the other half of the Van Winter collection was sold by Van Loon heirs in 1877 to Gustave baron de Rothschild (son of James Mayer de Rothschild) in Paris.

The Six collection has been the subject of controversy in the Netherlands for decades, because though the house on the Amstel received subsidy from the Dutch government and was open to the public for visiting hours, the house was always also used as a home, and the number of visitors was limited. The dispute has been resolved and the top pieces are lent to the Rijksmuseum several months every other year.

The Six collection is still curated by the Six family descended from Jan Six.
