= Dagnam Park =

Park in London, England

Coordinates: 51°36′52.16″N 0°14′16.3″E

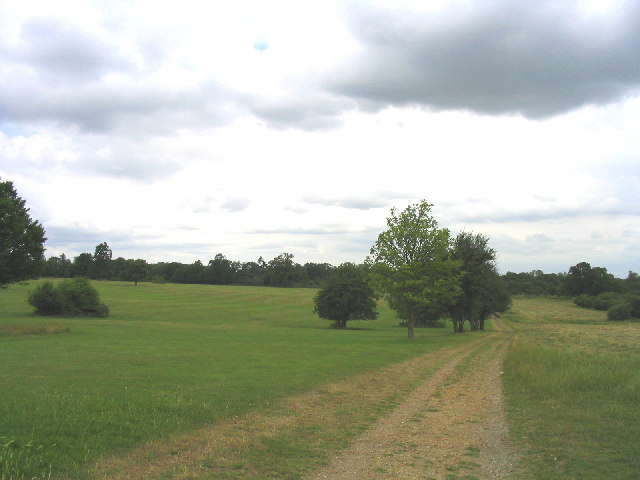
Dagnam Park

Dagnam Park is a public park located in Harold Hill in the London Borough of Havering.

It is a remnant of the grounds of Dagnams Park, the house of the manor of Dagnams. In 1947 the 850 acres remaining of the Dagnams estate was sold to the London County Council for the construction of the Harold Hill estate.

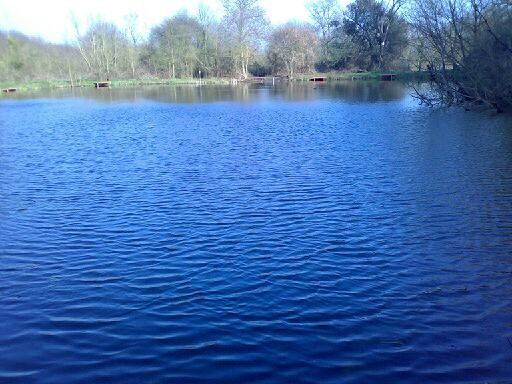
Lily Pond

The park is part of The Manor Local Nature Reserve, which includes Hatters Wood, Fir Wood, Duck Wood and Dagnam Park.
