= Isabella Henriette van Eeghen =

Dutch local historian (1913–1996)

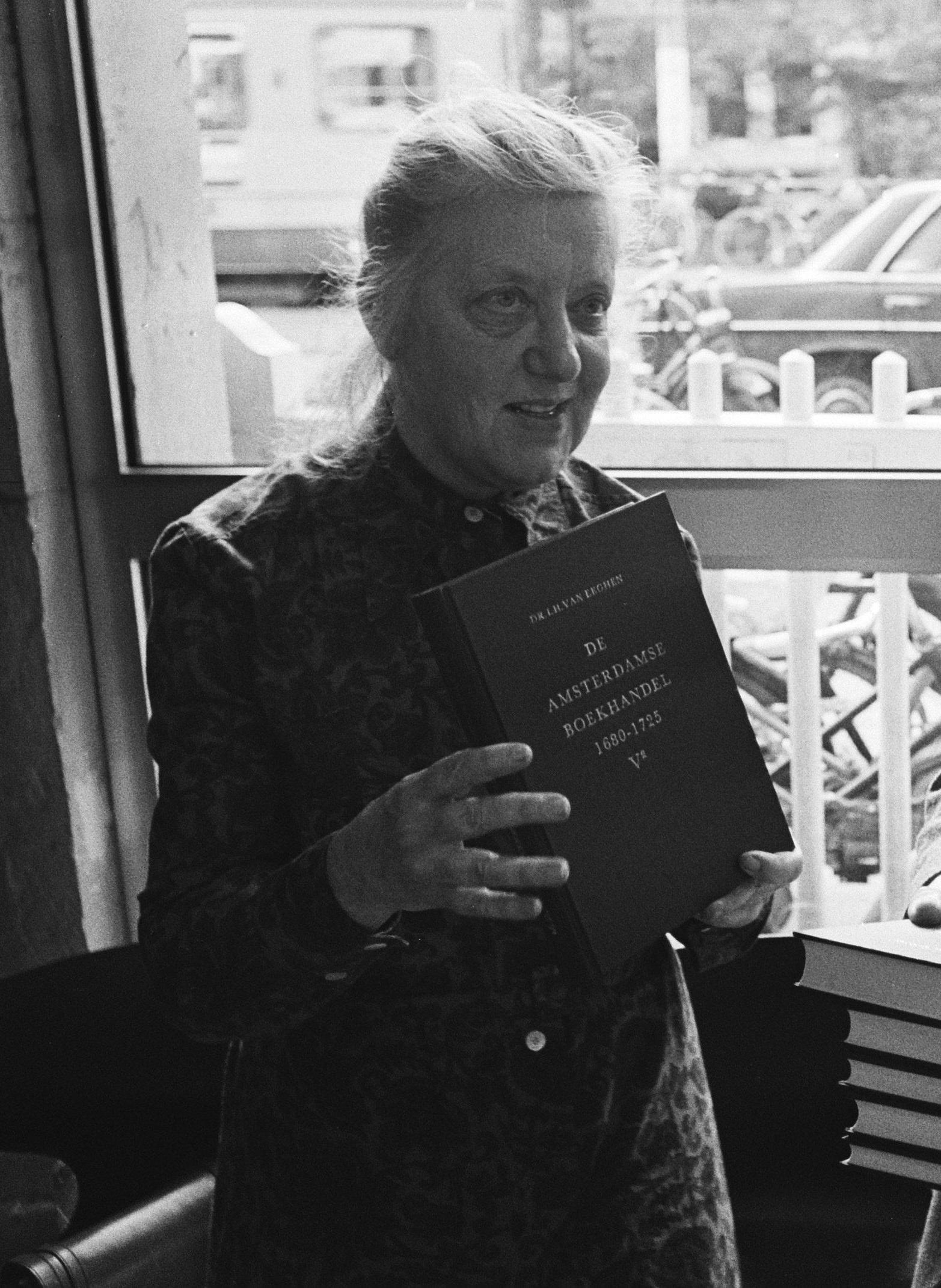
- Born: 3 February 1913; Amsterdam, Netherlands
- Died: 26 November 1996 (aged 83); Amsterdam, Netherlands

Isabella Henriette van Eeghen (3 February 1913 – 26 November 1996), usually cited as I. H. van Eeghen, was a Dutch historian who worked for the Stadsarchief Amsterdam.

== Early life and education ==
Van Eeghen was born in Amsterdam as the daughter of the banker Christiaan Pieter van Eeghen in an Amsterdam canal mansion on 497 Herengracht that today is known as the KattenKabinet. Her father and grandfather were directors of Van Eeghen & Co. a bank active on the Herengracht since the 17th-century. Today, what remains of the firm is part of Bank Oyens & Van Eeghen. The young Isa was therefore quite wealthy, and determined to follow in the footsteps of her grandfather, also called Christiaan Pieter van Eeghen, who in his free time set up the Vondelpark and was responsible for various improvements to the Van der Hoop museum in 1854, the forerunner of the Rijksmuseum. It was the elder Van Eeghen who paid to have the paintings in the Amsterdam surgeons' guild restored in 1865, among them of course the Anatomy Lesson of Dr. Nicolaes Tulp.

Isa attended the local girls' school MMS and then continued at the Gymnasium, eventually earning her degree in history from the University of Amsterdam. She earned her doctorate with a study on the cloisters and monasteries of Amsterdam in 1937. She then started a study to become archivist, choosing the history of the Walloon community of Amsterdam as her object of study. She was forced to do this in a volunteer capacity because she was refused a job at the Amsterdam archives.

== Career ==
When she gained her archivists diploma in 1943, she was still not considered for a job as archivist, so she accepted a job as administrator at the archives in 1944. It wasn't until 1947 when the Maastricht archives offered her a job as archivist that the Amsterdam archives appointed her chartermaster. She was not the first woman in such a position, because Gerda Kurtz, who had similar troubles with discrimination, had been working at the Haarlem archives since 1938, albeit at a lower salary than male colleagues.

It was thus at the age of 32 that Isa first left her parents' home and rented rooms along with a group of five other women in a canal mansion on the nearby Prinsengracht, though she continued to eat dinner with her parents. In 1946, she became the first woman to be in the steering committee of the Amsterdam historical society Genootschap Amstelodamum. From 1950 to 1984, she was the editor of both its monthly magazine and its yearly book of essays Jaarboek Amstelodamum.

Among various projects, she was responsible for the exact dating and attribution of Amsterdam artworks of the 17th-century, most notably Elsje Christiaens. She was a specialist in historical stories about children, women, marriage, crime, and personal diaries. Known in Dutch as egodocumenten, she is one of the first to study these diaries as a source of historical evidence.

== Works ==
- De verzameling Van Eeghen : Amsterdamse tekeningen, 1600-1950 , Gemeentearchief Amsterdam, 1988
- Het Trippenhuis te Amsterdam, by Meischke, R.; Reeser, H.E.; Eeghen, I.H. van, Koninklijke Nederlandse Akademie van Wetenschappen, 1983
- Uit Amsterdamse dagboeken : de jeugd van Netje en Eduard Asser 1819-1833, Eeghen, I.H. van, Scheltema & Holkema, Amsterdam, 1964
- Het huis met de paarse ruiten en de familie van Loon in Amsterdam, Loon, M.N. van; Eeghen, I.H. van, Museum Van Loon, 1984
- Jacob Aertsz. Colom's Kaart van Holland 1681, by Eeghen, I.H. van, Sijmons, A.H., Alphen aan den Rijn: Canaletto, 1990
- Seven letters by Rembrandt, by Gerson, Horst, Eeghen, I.H. van, The Hague: Boucher, 1961
- Fodor 100 jaar : tentoonstelling van een keuze uit de collectie Fodor, by Eeghen, I.H. van, exhibition Museum Fodor 1963-07-12 - 1963-09-30, Amsterdam Museum, 1963
- An Amsterdam burgomaster's daughter by Rembrandt - in Buckingham Palace, by Eeghen, I.H. van, Stadsdrukkerij Amsterdam, 1958
- De Amsterdamse waaierindustrie in de 18de eeuw, by Eeghen, I.H. van, Genootschap Amstelodamum, 1953
- "In mijn journaal gezet" : Amsterdam 1805-1808 : het getekende dagboek van Christiaan Andriessen, by Eeghen, I.H. van, exhibition Gemeentearchief Amsterdam 1983-10-15 - 1983-12-17, Koninklijk Oudheidkundig Genootschap Amsterdam, 1983
- Alledaags Amsterdam in de Franse tijd, Eeghen, I.H. van, exhibition Gemeentearchief Amsterdam 1983-10-15 - 1983-12-17, 1983
- Eerherstel voor Christiaan Andriessen, Eeghen, I.H. van, Genootschap Amstelodamum, 1964
- Rembrandt aan de Amstel, by Eeghen, I.H. van, Genootschap Amstelodamum, 1969
- Vier eeuwen Herengracht : geveltekeningen van alle huizen aan de gracht, by Fontaine Verwey, H. de la; Eeghen, I.H. van; Roosegaarde Bischop, G.; Wijnman, H.F., Stadsdrukkerij Amsterdam, 1976
- Het Amsterdams grachtenboekje uit de zeventiende eeuw : het plaatwerk van Cornelis Danckerts, by Eeghen, I.H. van, Genootschap Amstelodamum, 1963
- Vier eeuwen Amsterdams Binnengasthuis : drie bijdragen over de geschiedenis van een gasthuis, by Moulin, D. de; Eeghen, I.H. van; Meischke, R., Nijgh & van Ditmar, 1973
- Amsterdam in de tweede helft der XIXe eeuw gezien door Jacob Olie Jacobsz, by Eeghen, I.H. van, Genootschap Amstelodamum, 1960
- De historische verzameling der Universiteit van Amsterdam (1923-1953), by Eeghen, I.H. van, Stadsdrukkerij Amsterdam, 1953
- Vrouwenkloosters en Begijnhof in Amsterdam van de 14e tot het einde der 16e eeuw, by Eeghen, I.H. van, Amsterdam: Paris, 1941
- Bewaard uit het hart : een selectie van 63 Amsterdamse woon- en pakhuizen uit de periode van 1450, by Eeghen, I.H. van; Jansen, L.; Kroon, B.A.M., Gemeente Amsterdam, 1965
- Inventaris van het archief van de familie Backer 16e-20e eeuw, by Eeghen, I.H. van, Gemeentearchief Amsterdam, 1996
- Het Deutzen Hofje, by Eeghen, I.H. van, Amsterdam, Deutzen Hofje, 1960

=== Rembrandt and other artwork research in Amstelodamum ===
- De anatomische lessen van Rembrandt, by Eeghen, I.H. van, 1948
- De echtgenoot van Cornelia Pronck, by Eeghen, I.H. van, 1956
- Baertjen Martens en Herman Doomer, by Eeghen, I.H. van, 1956
- Een doodshoofd van Rembrandt bij het Amsterdamse Chirugijnsgilde?, by Eeghen, I.H. van, 1956
- De kinderen van Rembrandt en Saskia, by Eeghen, I.H. van, 1956
- Maria Trip of een anoniem vrouwsportret van Rembrandt, by Eeghen, I.H. van, 1956
- Maarten Soolmans en Oopjen Coppit, by Eeghen, I.H. van, 1956
- Rembrandt's Claudius Civilis and the funeral ticket, by Eeghen, I.H. van, 1956
- De portretten van Philips Lucas en Petronella Buys, by Eeghen, I.H. van, 1956
- De Staalmeesters, by Eeghen, I.H. van, 1957
- De anatomische les van Christiaan Coevershof of : op zoek naar een notoir misdadiger, by Eeghen, I.H. van, 1958
- Rembrandt en de mensenvilders, by Eeghen, I.H. van, 1969
- Elsje Christiaens en de kunsthistorici, by Eeghen, I.H. van, 1969
- Wat veroverde Rembrandt met zijn Claudius Civilis?, by Eeghen, I.H. van, 1969
- De Staalmeesters, by Eeghen, I.H. van, 1971
- Voor wie schilderde Rembrandt het portret van Nicolaas Ruts?, by Eeghen, I.H. van, 1977
- Willem Jansz van der Pluym en Rembrandt, by Eeghen, I.H. van, 1977
- Drie portretten van Rembrandt (Bruyningh, Cater, Moutmaker) Vondel en Blaeu, 1977
- De familie Trip en het Trippenhuis, by Eeghen, I.H. van, 1983
- De tekeningen van vader en zoon Andriessen, by Eeghen, I.H. van, 1985
