= List of drawings by Rembrandt =

The following is a list of drawings by Rembrandt that are generally accepted as autograph.

Image	Title	Year	Technique	Dimensions	Gallery	Commentary
	Old Man Reading a Book	c. 1628	?	?	Kupferstichkabinett Berlin	The drawing is related to the painting W27
	Study of the legs of a seated woman	c. 1628	Chalk	22.6 x 17.6 cm	Rijksmuseum Amsterdam	The drawing is related to the painting W37
	The Raising of the Cross	1628-1629	Black chalk, heightened with white, framing lines in pencil and with the pen and brown ink	19.3 x 14.8 cm	Museum Boijmans Van Beuningen, Rotterdam	The drawing is related to the painting W106
	Two Sitting Figures	c. 1628-1629	Black chalk	19.3 x 14.8 cm	Museum Boijmans Van Beuningen, Rotterdam	The drawing is related to the painting W23
	Three Scribes	c. 1628-1629	Pen, brush	22.6 x 17.6 cm	Rijksmuseum Amsterdam	The drawing is related to the painting W23
	Old Man with Outspread Arms	c. 1628-1629	?	?	Kupferstichkabinett, Dresden	The drawing is related to the etching B095
	Study for Judas Returning the Thirty Pieces of Silver	c. 1628-1629	?	?	Private collection	The drawing is related to the painting W23
	Standing Beggar in Lost Profile	c. 1628-1629	Pen	29.4 x 17 cm	Rijksmuseum Amsterdam	The drawing is related to the etching B162
	Self-portrait with Open Mouth	c. 1628-1629	Pen and brown ink with grey wash; ruled framing lines in the same brown ink	12.7 x 9.5 cm	British Museum, London	The drawing is related to the etching B013
	Self-portrait	c. 1629	Pen	12.7 x 9.4 cm	Rijksmuseum Amsterdam	The drawing is related to the etching B338
	St. Paul in Meditation	c. 1629	?	?	Musée du Louvre, Paris	Indented for transfer to the etching B149
	Diana at the Bath	c. 1629	Black chalk with some light brown wash	18.1 x 16.4 cm	British Museum, London	Indented for transfer to the etching B201
	Seated Old Man	1630	Red chalk on laid paper	15.7 x 14.7 cm	National Gallery of Art, Washington	Inscribed R 1630
	The Entombment of Christ	1630	Red chalk, corrected with white	28.2 x 20.4 cm	British Museum, London	Inscribed 1630
	Kneeling Man	c. 1630	Red and black chalk	20.6 x 16.1 cm	Musée du Louvre, Paris	Related to lost painting reproduced in a print dated 1631 by Jan van Vliet
	Seated Old Man	c. 1630	Red and black chalk	14.5 x 14.3 cm	Nationalmuseum, Stockholm	The drawing is related to the etching B325
	Bearded Old Man Seated in an Armchair	1631	Red chalk on paper	25 x 17 cm	Private collection, New York	Signed with the monogram RHL and dated 1631
	Old Man Seated in an Armchair	1631	Red chalk, frame line: pencil	22.7 x 14.7 cm	Teylers Museum, Haarlem	Inscribed RHL 1631
	Old Man with Clasped Hands, Seated in an Armchair	c. 1631	?	?	Kupferstichkabinett Berlin	Indented for transfer to the etching B291
	Bust of a Bearded Old Man	c. 1631	Red chalk, slightly touched with white chalk	11.4 x 9.1 cm	Musée du Louvre, Paris	The drawing is related to the etching B315
	Violin Player and Woman	c. 1631	?	?	Kupferstichkabinett Berlin	The drawing is related to the etching B138
	Lying Naked Woman	c. 1632	Black and white chalk on paper	19.5 x 23.4 cm	Nationalmuseum, Stockholm	The drawing is related to the painting W130
	Old Man Leaning on a Stick	1632–1635	Pen and brown ink	13.5 x 7.8 cm	Metropolitan Museum of Art, New York	The drawing is related to the etching B133
	Study for Drunk Lot	1633	Black chalk on paper	25.1 x 18.9 cm	Städel, Frankfurt am Main	Inscribed Rembrandt f. / 1633
	Portrait of Saskia as a Bride	1633	Silver pen on white-grounded parchment	18.5 x 10.6 cm	Kupferstichkabinett Berlin	Inscribed dit is near mijn huisvrou geconterfeyt / do sy 21 jaer oud was den derden / dach als wij getroudt waeren / den 8 Junijus / 1633 (This was portrayed after my wife when she was 21 years old, the third day after we were married. June 8, 1633)
	Woman Seated in an Armchair	c. 1633	?	?	Kunsthalle Hamburg	Considered to be a preparatory drawing for the painting W88b
	Man Kneeling	c. 1633	?	?	Städel, Frankfurt am Main	The drawing is related to the etching B111
	Entrance of a Cottage	c. 1633	?	?	Kunsthalle Hamburg	The drawing is related to the etching B090
	Self-portrait	c. 1633	?	?	Musée des beaux-arts de Marseille	The drawing is related to the etching B017
	Landscape with Two Cottages	c. 1633	Silverpoint on prepared parchment	8.2 x 13.3 cm	Museum Boijmans Van Beuningen, Rotterdam	The drawing is related to the painting W206
	Study for the Painting of St. John the Baptist Preaching	c. 1633-1634	pen, brown ink and brown wash with white heightenings	14.5 × 20.4 cm	Musée du Louvre, Paris	The drawing is related to the painting W110
	The Preaching of St. John the Baptist	c. 1633-1634	?	?	Private collection	The drawing is related to the painting W110
	Three Studies of a Bowman	c. 1633-1634	?	?	Nationalmuseum, Stockholm	Inscribed on the reverse ...lderij 2 - 0 - 0 / 3 - 8 - 0 ... / 5 - 0 - 0. The drawing is related to the painting W110
	Groups of Listeners	c. 1633-1634	?	?	Kupferstichkabinett Berlin	The drawing is related to the painting W110
	Studies for Groups and Figures	c. 1633-1634	?	?	Kupferstichkabinett Berlin	The drawing is related to the painting W110
	Two Studies of a Woman Seated on the Ground	c. 1633-1634	?	?	Musée du Louvre, Paris	The drawing is related to the painting W110
	Bearded Old Man with a Fur Cap	c. 1633-1634	?	?	Musée du Louvre, Paris	The drawing is related to the painting W110
	Two Men in Discussion, a Third Listening to Them	c. 1633-1634	?	?	Chatsworth House	The drawing is related to the painting W110
	Sketch of a Bearded Old Man and Three Studies of Headgear	c. 1633-1634	?	?	Chatsworth House	The drawing is related to the painting W110
	Portrait of a Man in an Armchair, Seen Through a Frame	1634	Black and red chalk, pen and wash in bistre, on vellum	37.3 x 27.2 cm	Private collection, New York	Inscribed Rembrandt f. 1634
	Bearded Old Man	1634	?	?	Royal library, the Hague	Inscribed on pasted strip: Een vroom gemoet acht eer voor goet / Rembrandt / Amsterdam. 1634
	Jesus and his Disciples	1634	Brown pen, gray brush, brown brush, black chalk, red chalk, green chalk, black pen	35.7 x 47.8 cm	Teylers Museum, Haarlem	Inscribed Rembrandt f. 1634
	Bearded Old Man in a High Fur Cap	c. 1634-1635	Pen and brown ink on	10.5 x 9.6 cm	Morgan Library, New York	The drawing is related to the painting W110
	Two Studies of John the Baptist	c. 1634-1635	red chalk on paper	18.2 x 17.4 cm	Courtauld Gallery, London	The drawing is related to the painting W110
	The Last Supper, after Leonardo da Vinci	1634–1635	Red chalk	36.2 x 47.5 cm	Metropolitan Museum of Art, New York	Inscribed Rembrandt f.
	Two Butchers at Work	1635	Pen and bistre	14.9 x 20 cm	Städel, Frankfurt am Main	Inscribed t vel daer aen ende voorts de rest bysleepende
	The Angel Preventing Abraham from Sacrificing his Son, Isaac	1635	Red chalk over black chalk, with grey wash, on paper prepared with light brown wash	19.5 x 14.7 cm	British Museum, London	Regarded as a preparatory drawing for the painting W136
	The Last Supper, after Leonardo da Vinci	c. 1635	Red chalk, heightened with white, on paper	12.5 x 21 cm	British Museum, London	Inscribed R..b...dt
	The Last Supper, after Leonardo da Vinci	1635	Pen and brown ink, wash, traces of white	12.8 x 38.5 cm	Kupferstichkabinett Berlin	Inscribed Rembrandt f. 1635
	The Baptism of the Eunuch	c. 1635	?	?	Staatliche Graphische Sammlung München	Related to a lost painting by Rembrandt that was reproduced in a print by his associate Jan van Vliet in 1631
	The Lamentation over the Dead Christ	c. 1635	?	?	Kupferstichkabinett Berlin	The drawing is related to the painting W113
	Soldiers and Girls Carousing	c. 1635	?	?	Kupferstichkabinett Berlin	The drawing is related to the painting W135
	The Prodigal Son in the Tavern	c. 1635	?	?	Städel, Frankfurt am Main	The drawing is related to the painting W135
	The Naughty Child	c. 1635	Pen and brown ink on paper, brown wash	20,7 x 14,2 cm	Kupferstichkabinett Berlin	The drawing is related to the painting W137
	The Abduction of Ganymede	c. 1635	Pen and brush in brown	18,5 x 16,1 cm	Kupferstichkabinett, Dresden	Regarded as a preparatory drawing for the painting W137
	Seated Old Woman, Full Length	c. 1635	?	?	Ossolineum, Wrocław	The drawing is related to the painting W173
	Man in a Tall Fur Hat	c. 1635	?	?	Städel, Frankfurt am Main	The drawing is related to the etching B097
	The Pancake Woman	c. 1635	Pen	10.8 x 14.4 cm	Rijksmuseum Amsterdam	The drawing is related to the etching B124
	Seated Woman with a Rolled-up Letter	c. 1635	Pen and brown ink, washes in brown	24 x 19 cm	Nationalmuseum, Stockholm	The drawing is related to the etching B340
	Four Studies of Saskia	c. 1635-1636	Pen and brown ink, locally gray wash, corrected with white bodycolour	20 x 15 cm	Museum Boijmans Van Beuningen, Rotterdam	The drawing is related to the etchings B365, B367, B368
	Self-portrait	c. 1636	?	?	Kupferstichkabinett Berlin	The drawing is related to the etching B019
	Susannah and the Elders	c. 1636	Sanguine on paper	23.5 x 26.4 cm	Kupferstichkabinett Berlin	Inscribed on the reverse verkoft syn vaendrager synd – 15 - / een floora verhandelt – 6 -/ (f)ardynandus van sijn werck verhandelt / aen ander werck van sijn voornemen / den Abraham een floorae / Leenderts floorae is verhandelt tegen 5 g
	Old Man in a Turban, Drawn Twice	c. 1636	?	?	Private collection	The drawing is related to the painting W213
	Head of an Oriental in a Turban	c. 1636	?	?	Private collection	The drawing is related to the painting W213
	Old Man in a Turban	c. 1636	Pen and iron-gall ink on paper tinted with a pale yellow wash	17.3 x 13.5 cm	National Gallery of Victoria, Melbourne	The drawing is related to the painting W213
	Head of an Oriental in a Turban	c. 1636	?	?	Musée du Louvre, Paris	The drawing is related to the painting W213
	Studies of a Woman with Two Children	c. 1636	?	?	Peck Collection	Inscribed een kindekin met een oudt jack op syn hoofdken
	Jacob Being Shown Joseph's Bloody Cloak	c. 1635-1637	?	?	Kupferstichkabinett Berlin	The drawing is related to the etching B038
	Joseph Distributing Corn in Egypt, after Pieter Lastman	1637	Black chalk	31,3 x 46,2 cm	Albertina, Vienna	Inscribed Rembrandt ft.
	An Elephant	1637	Black chalk on paper	23,3 x 35,4 cm	Albertina, Vienna	Inscribed Rembrandt ft. 1637
	Self-Portrait	c. 1637	Red chalk	12.9 x 11.9 cm	National Gallery of Art, Washington	The drawing is related to the etching B002
	Study of Russian Costume	c. 1637	?	?	Morgan Library, New York	Inscribed in ongenaeden synden en werden niet geschooren
	Studies of Grieving Marys	c. 1637	Pen in brown and red chalk	20.1 x 14.3 cm	Rijksmuseum Amsterdam	Inscribed een dijvoot thresoor dat in een fijn harte bewaert wert tot troost harer beleevende siel
	Paul and Barnabas at Lystra	c. 1637	Sanguine	29.8 x 44.2 cm	Musée Bonnat, Bayonne	Inscribed een vrouw wijst op een jonck kind
	The Lamentation at the Foot of the Cross	c. 1637	Pen and brown ink and brown wash, with red and perhaps some black chalk	21.6 x 25.4 cm	British Museum, London	The drawing is related to painting W113
	Joseph Telling his Dreams	c. 1637	Red chalk	18 x 12.5 cm	Museum Boijmans Van Beuningen, Rotterdam	The drawing is related to the etching B037
	Studies of a Woman Reading and an Oriental	c. 1637	?	?	Private collection	The drawing is related to the etching B037
	Man Kneeling in Prayer; a Woman's Head	с. 1637	Red chalk	18.3 x 15.8 cm	Albertina, Vienna	The drawing is related to the etchings B098 and B367
	Solomon's Idolatry	c. 1636-1638	Red chalk	48.5 x 37.6 cm	Musée du Louvre, Paris	The drawing is related to the painting W47
	Eve Giving the Apple to Adam	c. 1638	?	?	Private collection	The drawing is related to the etching B028
	Eve Giving the Apple to Adam	c. 1638	?	?	Private collection	The drawing is related to the etching B028
	Saskia Sitting up in Bed	c. 1638	Pen and brush in brown, corrected with opaque white, tinted paper	15 x 13.8 cm	Kupferstichkabinett, Dresden	The drawing is related to the etching B369
	Saskia Asleep in Bed	c. 1638	Pen and brown ink	?	Ashmolean Museum, Oxford	The drawing is related to the etching B369
	Sick Woman Lying in Bed, Probably Saskia	c. 1638	?	?	Petit Palais, Paris	The drawing is related to the etching B369
	Saskia in Bed	c. 1635-1640	Pen and brown ink	8.4 x 10.4 cm	British Museum, London	The drawing is related to the etching B369
	Portrait of Titia van Uylenburch	1639	Pen and brown ink, washes on brown paper	17.4 x 14.6 cm	Nationalmuseum, Stockholm	Inscribed Tijtsija van Ulenburch / 1639
	Portrait of Baldassare Castiglione, after Raphael	1639	Pen and brown ink, white body colour	16.3 x 20.7 cm	Albertina, Vienna	Inscribed de Conten batasar de kastijlijone van raefael / verkoft voor 3500 gulden / het geheel cargesoen tot Luke van Nuffelen heeft gegolden f59456:- Ao 1639
	Portrait of a Young Woman Holding Gloves	c. 1639	Pen and brown iron-gall ink, with brown wash, heightened with white	16 x 12.9 cm	British Museum, London	Regarded as a preparatory drawing for the painting W184b
	Woman in a Rich Dress and a Fur Hat, Seen from Behind	c. 1639	?	?	Museum der bildenden Künste, Leipzig	The drawing is related to the etching B109
	The Artist Drawing from the Model	c. 1639	Pen and brown iron-gall ink with brown wash and touched with white, on paper washed brown	18.8 x 16.4 cm	British Museum, London	The drawing is related to the etching B192
	Study for a Presentation in the Temple	c. 1639	Pen and dark bistre	18 x 19 cm	Amsterdam Museum	The drawing is related to the etching B049
	Portrait of Cornelis Claesz Anslo	1640	Red chalk, heightened with white, on paper	15.7 x 14 cm	British Museum, London	Inscribed Rembrandt f. 1640. Indented for transfer to the etching B271
	Portrait of Cornelis Claesz Anslo	1640	Red chalk, pen and wash in bistre, Indian ink, whity body colour	24.6 x 20.1 cm	Musée du Louvre, Paris	Inscribed Rembrandt f. 1640
	Nude Man Kneeling	c. 1640	?	?	Musée Bonnat, Bayonne	The drawing is related to the etching B092
	Sleeping Watchdog	c. 1640	Pen and brown ink with brush and brown wash, with touches of opaque white watercolor, on cream laid paper	14.3 x 16.8 cm	Museum of Fine Arts, Boston	The drawing is related to the etching B158
	Three Men Being Beheaded	c. 1640	Pen and brown ink, corrected with white; framing lines in pen and brown ink	15.3 x 22.6 cm	British Museum, London	The drawing is related to the etching B092
	Sketch of an Executioner	c. 1640	Pen	15.6 x 20.1 cm	Rijksmuseum Amsterdam	The drawing is related to the etching B092
	Bust of the Emperor Galba	1640-1641	Pen and bistre	14.2 x 9 cm	Kupferstichkabinett Berlin	Inscribed .alba
	The Entombment of Christ	c. 1640-1641	Pen	15.6 x 21 cm	Rijksmuseum Amsterdam	The drawing is related to the painting W162
	The Passeerder Windmill in Amsterdam	c. 1640-1641	?	?	Formerly Bremen, Kunsthalle	The drawing is related to the etching B233
	Two Men in Discussion, One in Oriental Dress	1641	Quill and reed pen in brown ink with corrections in white bodycolour (darkened) on laid paper	22.9 x 18.5 cm	Courtauld Gallery, London	Inscribed Rembrandt f. 1641
	Christ and the Woman Taken in Adultery	c. 1639-1641	?	?	Musée du Louvre, Paris	The drawing is related to the painting W47
	Seated Old Woman, Half-length	c. 1641	?	?	Courtauld Gallery, London	The drawing is related to the painting W173
	A Man Helping a Rider to Mount a Horse	c. 1641	Pen	14.2 x 14.9 cm	Rijksmuseum Amsterdam	The drawing is related to the painting W153
	Windmill on the Bastion Blauwhoofd in Amsterdam	c. 1641	Oiled charcoal on brown tinted paper, framing lines with the pen in brown ink, gone over in pencil on the right side	16.6 x 27.5 cm	Museum Boijmans Van Beuningen, Rotterdam	The drawing is related to the etching B233
	Studies of an Officer, an Oriental and a Man in High Cap	c. 1641-1642	Pen	21.2 x 13.4 cm	Musée du Louvre, Paris	The drawing is related to the painting W190
	Two Jews in Discussion, Walking	1641-1642	Black chalk, pen and brown	9.7 x 8.4 cm	Teylers Museum, Haarlem	Inscribed .../ ...samson/ sijnd troni/ een(?) die een pijl wtreckt over/ ... schouder
	Figure Studies	c. 1642	?	?	Rembrandthuis, Amsterdam	The drawing is related to the etching W120
	Two Women Walking (Ruth and Naomi?)	c. 1642	?	?	Royal Museums of Fine Arts of Belgium, Brussels	The drawing is related to the etching W120
	Cottage Near the Edge of a Wood	1644	Pen and inks ranging from light to dark brown, brown washes, corrected in white (oxidized, partially abraded), and touches of red chalk (in added structures to the left of the main cottage)	29.9 x 45.5 cm	Metropolitan Museum of Art, New York	Inscribed Rembrandt f. 1644
	Satire on Art Criticism	1644	Pen and brown ink corrected with white	15.5 x 20.1 cm	Metropolitan Museum of Art, New York	Inscribed den tijd 16[4?]4 / dees ... van d kunst / is .ooting gunst ... Houdlos... / i ind. dat...
	Jacob's Dream	c. 1644	?	?	École des Beaux-Arts, Paris	Inscribed in ongenaeden synden en werden niet geschooren
	Posthumous Portrait of the Preacher Jan Cornelisz. Sylvius	1644-1645	?	?	National Gallery of Art, Washington	Inscribed den een on ... sijden ... ofte ... /near Chrisstum gaenden
	Young Woman Looking out of a Window	c. 1645	?	?	Courtauld Gallery, London	The drawing is related to the painting W200
	Sheet of Studies, with a Woman Teaching a Child to Walk	c. 1646	Pen and brown ink	16 x 16.5 cm	Nationalmuseum, Stockholm	The drawing is related to the etching B194
	Jan Cornelisz Sylvius	c. 1646	Pen and brown ink	14 x 11.6 cm	Nationalmuseum, Stockholm	The drawing is related to the etching B280
	Jan Cornelisz Sylvius	c. 1646	Pen and brown ink, with white heightening	28.5 x 19.5 cm	British Museum, London	The drawing is related to the etching B280
	The Star of the Kings	1645-1647	Pen and brown ink with (on the recto only) brown wash mixed with some white bodycolour; framing line in pen and brown ink (right side only).	20.4 x 32.3 cm.	British Museum, London	Inscribed Rembrandt f.
	Jan Six	1647	?	?	Six Collection, Amsterdam	Indented for transfer to the etching B285
	Jan Six in Hat	1647	?	?	Amsterdam Museum	The drawing is related to the etching B285
	Jan Six with a Dog	1647	Pen and wash? white body colour	22 x 17.5 cm	Six Collection, Amsterdam	The drawing is related to the etching B285
	Study for a Susanna	c. 1647	Black chalk and brush on paper	20.3 x 16.4 cm	Kupferstichkabinett Berlin	The drawing is related to the painting W213
	Two Sick Women	c. 1645-1649	Pen	10.1 x 12.2 cm	Rijksmuseum Amsterdam	The drawing is related to the etching B074
	Head of a Sick Woman	c. 1645-1649	?	?	Rijksmuseum Amsterdam	The drawing is related to the etching B074
	Man Standing, a Cap in his Outstretched Right Hand	c. 1645-1649	?	?	Courtauld Gallery, London	The drawing is related to the etching B074
	Blind Old Man Guided by a Woman	c. 1645-1649	?	?	Musée du Louvre, Paris	The drawing is related to the etching B074
	Study for the Group of the Sick	c. 1645-1649	?	?	Kupferstichkabinett Berlin	The drawing is related to the etching B074
	Study of a Seated Beggar Woman, Supplicating	c. 1645-1649	?	?	Private collection	The drawing is related to the etching B074
	Old Man with a Fur Cap	c. 1645-1649	?	?	Private collection	The drawing is related to the etching B074
	Study for the Hundred-guilder Print	c. 1645-1649	?	?	Musée du Louvre, Paris	The drawing is related to the etching B074
	The Amsteldijk at Meerhuizen, Looking Towards The Little Windmill	c. 1649-1650	?	?	Musée du Louvre, Paris	Inscribed on the reverse: Dees tekeningh vertoont de buiten amstelkant / Soo braaf getekent door heer rembrandts eygen hant / PKo (This drawing depicts the Buiten-Amstel, most able drawn by Master Rembrandt's own hand. P[hilips] Ko[ninck]).
	St. Jerome Reading in an Italian Landscape	c. 1650	Reed pen and wash	25 x 20.7 cm	Kunsthalle Hamburg	The drawing is related to the etching B104
	Farm Buildings Near a Canal	c. 1650	Pen and dark greyish brown ink with greyish brown wash on grey paper	11.6 x 12.2 cm	British Museum, London	The drawing is related to the etching B213
	Cottage on the Diemerdijk, Looking East	c. 1650	?	?	Ashmolean Museum, Oxford	The drawing is related to the etching B213
	Landscape with the House with the Little Tower	c. 1650	Pen and brown ink, brush and brown wash	9.7 x 21.4 cm	J. Paul Getty Museum, Los Angeles	The drawing is related to the etching B235
	View of Haarlem with the Saxenburg Estate in the Foreground	c. 1650-1651	Pen and brown ink, brown wash, heightened with white	8.9 x 15.2 cm	Museum Boijmans Van Beuningen, Rotterdam	The drawing is related to the etching B234
	Landscape with a Farmhouse and a Hay Barn	c. 1650-1652	Pen, brown ink and brownish wash on light brown paper	8.8 x 17.3 cm	National Gallery of Denmark, Copenhagen	The drawing is related to the etching B224
	Farmstead with Adjoining House	c. 1650-1652	?	?	Private collection	The drawing is related to the etching B224
	Farmhouse beneath Trees, with a Footbridge	c. 1650-1652	Reed pen and brown ink, grey wash, some white highlighting on brownish paper	15.7 x 18.1 cm	Fitzwilliam Museum, Cambridge	The drawing is related to the etching B222
	Susanna and the Elders	c. 1650-1652	Brush	20.1 x 18.8 cm	Rijksmuseum Amsterdam	The drawing is related to the painting W213
	Homer Reciting Verses	1652	?	?	Six Collection, Amsterdam	Inscribed Rembrandt aen Joannes Sicx. 1652
	Minerva in her Study	1652	?	?	Six Collection, Amsterdam	Inscribed Rembrandt f. 1652
	The Ruins of the Old City Hall in Amsterdam (After the Fire)	1652	?	?	Rembrandt House Museum, Amsterdam	Inscribed vand waech afte sien stats huis van Amsteldam doent afgebrandt was den 9 Julij 1652. Rembrandt
	View at the Inn Huis te Vraag	с. 1652	?	?	Present location unknown	The drawing is related to the etching B221
	Bust of Andrea Doria	1653	?	?	Kupferstichkabinett Berlin	Inscribed ANDREAS D. AVREA Hartog van S[tad] genuwa
	The Calumny of Apelles, after Mantegna	c. 1652-1654	Pen and brown ink, with brown wash, on grey-brown prepared paper	26.3 x 43.2 cm	British Museum, London	Inscribed CaLomnia d'apella / Inocenv[v=s]ia / Susp[ic]ione / I[g]nora[n]cia / acnoni / Ins[s=v]idia / Penitencia / Veritas
	River with Trees	1654-1655	?	?	Musée du Louvre, Paris	Inscribed on reverse [om te] etsen witten tarpentyn oly / [daer] toe de helft tarpentyn / tesaemen in een glaesen flesken gedaen en / flesken in suver[?] waeter een ha[lf] [uu]r laeten kooken
	Jupiter with Philemon and Baucis	1655	?	?	Kupferstichkabinett Berlin	Inscribed d'ouden filemon onvan[g]t mes ind[e] mon en dHaend op de vloer omgeswicht
	The Anatomy Lecture of Dr. Jan Deyman	1656	?	?	Amsterdam Museum	Study for a frame for the painting W246
	Four Orientals Seated under a Tree	c. 1656	Pen and brown ink with brown and grey wash, touched with white and with some scraping-out, on oriental paper prepared with pale brown wash	19.4 x 12.4 cm	British Museum, London	The drawing is related to the etching B029
	The Emperor Akbar and his Son Selim in Apotheosis	c. 1656	Pen and brown ink, brown wash, corrected with white bodycolour	21.2 x 17.4 cm	Museum Boijmans Van Beuningen, Rotterdam	The drawing is related to the etching B029
	Christ Comforted by the Angel	c. 1657	?	?	Kunsthalle Hamburg	The drawing is related to the etching B075
	The Agony in the Garden	c. 1657	Brown ink; brown wash; paper	19.6 x 19 cm	Fitzwilliam Museum, Cambridge	The drawing is related to the etching B075
	Lieven Willemsz. van Coppenol	c. 1658	?	?	Museum of Fine Arts (Budapest)	The drawing is related to the etching B282
	Christ and the Woman Taken in Adultery	1659-1660	?	?	Staatliche Graphische Sammlung München	Inscribed on an attached strip of paper soo jachtich om Christus in zijn antwoordt te verschalken konden schrifterlick antw[oord] niet afwachten
	The Blind Belisarius Receiving Alms	c. 1660	?	?	Kupferstichkabinett Berlin	Inscribed erbarmt u over den armen bellisaro die nochtans wel was in groot aensien door syn manhaftijge daden en door de jalousij is verblindt
	Walking Man in a High Cap	c. 1660	Pen	14.7 x 6.2 cm	Rijksmuseum Amsterdam	The drawing is related to the painting W320
	Self-portrait	с. 1660	Pen and black-brown ink, brush in gray, white blush on sepia paper	8.2 x 7.1 cm	Albertina, Vienna	The drawing is related to the painting W281
	Simeon's Song of Praise	1661	?	?	Royal library, the Hague	Inscribed Rembrandt f. 1661
	The Conspiracy of Claudius Civilis	1661	?	?	Staatliche Graphische Sammlung München	The drawing is related to the painting W298
	A Child Being Taught to Walk	c. 1660-1662	Pen and brown ink on brownish-cream paper	9.3 x 15.4 cm	British Museum, London	Inscribed on reverse 'dit voor af te vragen / [vr]agen aen ons beijde oft wijt an de Heeren / [g?]oede mannen willen laten ver blijben / dan tijssen te vragen of Hij niet een / beijden d schilderien gelieft opgemaeckt te hebben / geen van beijden begerende.'
	Three Syndics of the Clothmakers' Guild	c. 1661-1662	?	?	Kupferstichkabinett Berlin	The drawing is related to the painting W299
	Study of a Syndic, Jacob van Loon	c. 1661-1662	Pen and brush in brown, corrections with white	19.5 x 16 cm	Rijksmuseum Amsterdam	The drawing is related to the painting W299
	Study for One of the Syndics, Volckert Jansz.	c. 1661-1662	Reed pen and brush in brown ink, brown wash, corrected and heightened with white, on cashbook paper	22.5 x 17.5 cm	Museum Boijmans Van Beuningen, Rotterdam	The drawing is related to the painting W299
	Isaac and Rebecca	c. 1662	?	?	Private collection	The drawing is related to the painting W312
	A coach	c. 1660-1663	Pen and brown ink with greyish brown wash	19.3 x 25.4 cm	British Museum, London	The drawing is related to the painting W303
	Homer Dictating to a Scribe	c. 1663	Pen, brush and brown ink, heightened with white	14.8 x 17 cm	Nationalmuseum, Stockholm	The drawing is related to the painting W301
	Elsje Christiaens Hanging on a Gibbet (front view)	1664	Pen and brown ink, brush and brown wash	17.1 x 9.1 cm	Metropolitan Museum of Art, New York	
	Elsje Christiaens Hanging on a Gibbet (side view)	1664	Pen and brown ink, brush and grayish brown wash on heavy brownish paper	15.8 x 8.0 cm	Metropolitan Museum of Art, New York	

== See also ==
- List of paintings by Rembrandt
- List of etchings by Rembrandt
- Rembrandt's Mughal drawings
- Self-portraits by Rembrandt

== Sources ==
- Rembrandt Drawings: 116 Masterpieces in Original Color. Dover Publications, Inc. Mineola, New York. 2007. ISBN 978-0-4864-6149-6.
- http://www.garyschwartzarthistorian.nl/schwartzlist/?id=148
