= River with Trees =

Drawing by Rembrandt

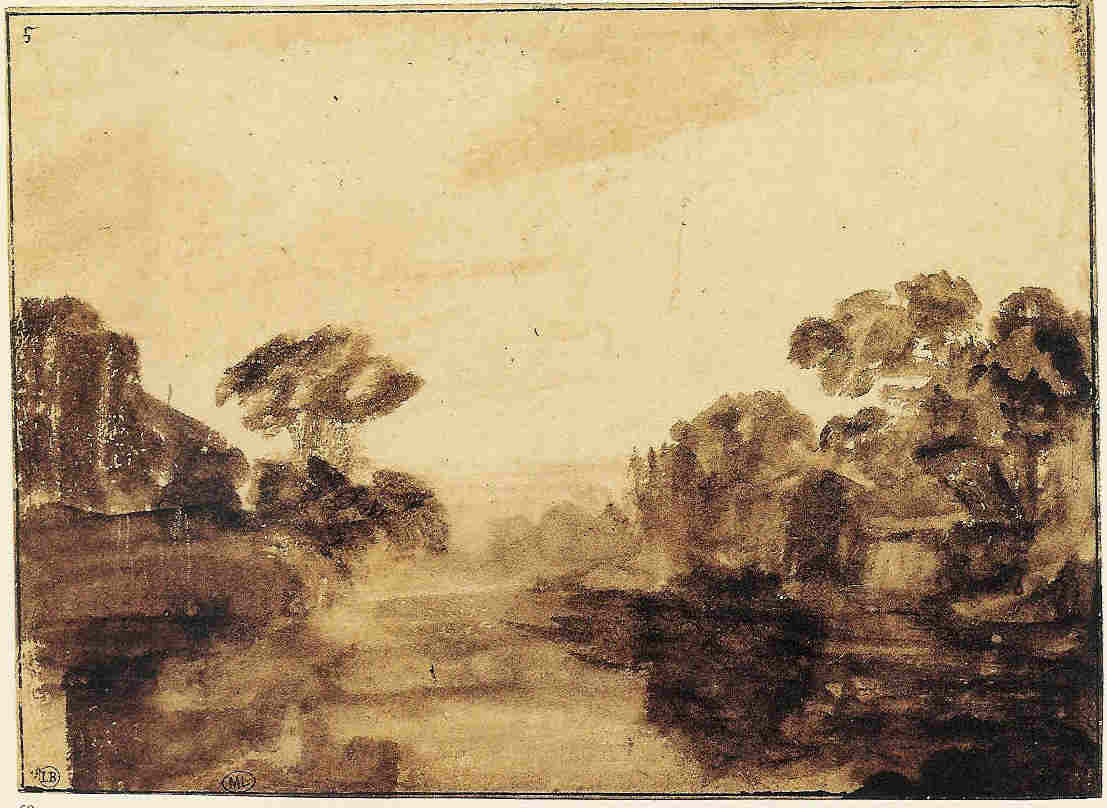
- Artist: Rembrandt
- Location: Louvre, Paris

River with Trees is a brown wash landscape drawing by Rembrandt, dating to c. 1654–1655 and now in the Louvre in Paris.

== See also ==
- List of drawings by Rembrandt
