= Portrait of Maria Trip =

Painting by Rembrandt, c. 1639

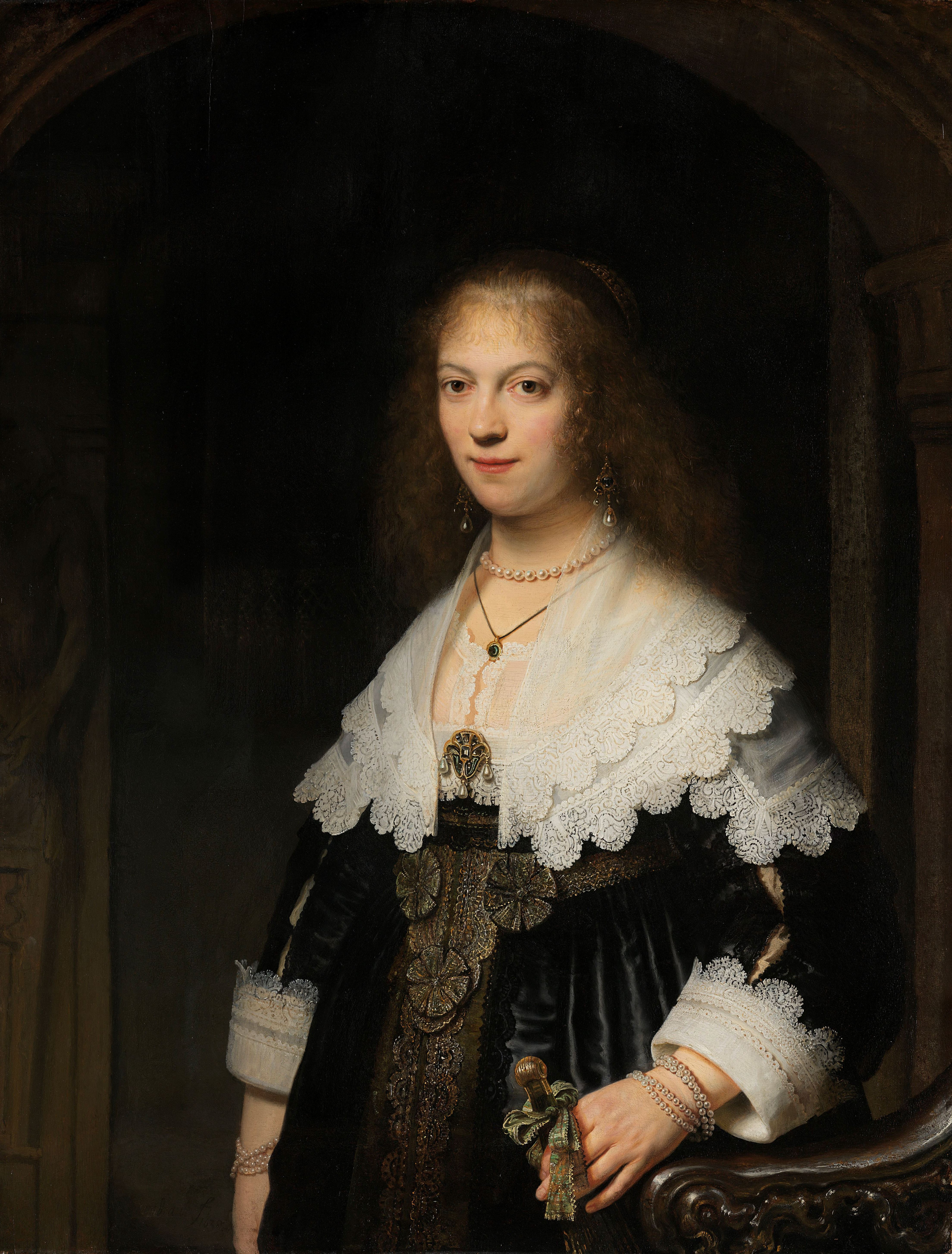
- Artist: Rembrandt
- Year: c.1639
- Catalog: Rembrandt Research Project, A Corpus of Rembrandt Paintings VI: #184b
- Medium: oil on panel
- Dimensions: 107 cm × 82 cm (42 in × 32 in)
- Location: Rijksmuseum, Amsterdam

Portrait of Maria Trip (c. 1639) is an oil painting on panel by the Dutch painter Rembrandt. It is an example of Dutch Golden Age painting and is now in the collection of the Rijksmuseum.

This painting was documented by Hofstede de Groot in 1915, who wrote:

845. A YOUNG WOMAN AT A STONE BALUSTRADE.

Bode 19; Dut. 283; Wb. 352; B.-HdG. 274. About thirty-five. Half-length; life size. She stands, inclined to the left, and looks at the spectator. She holds her fan in her left hand, which rests on the balustrade. Her brown hair is uncovered and falls in ringlets on her brow. Her figured black silk gown is cut out at the throat and trimmed with rosettes; over it is a triple collar of rich lace, lying flat. She has rich pearls in her ears, on her bosom, round her neck, and on her wrists. A small jewelled medallion is suspended from a black ribbon. Her right hand hangs at her side. She stands in front of a recess with a caryatid to the left; behind her is a dark curtain. Full daylight falls from the front. Corrections are visible on the lower edge, where there was once a table, and there were large buttons on the left sleeve.

Signed on the left at foot, "Rembrandt f. 1639"; cedar panel, 42 inches by 32 inches. A carefully executed pen-sketch for this picture is in the British Museum Print Room; reproduced, HdG. iv. 88. Etched by L. Flameng in the Gazette des Beaux-Arts, and in Dutuit, iii. Mentioned by Vosmaer, pp. 170, 520; Bode, pp. 459, 559; Dutuit, p. 54; Michel, pp. 213, 565 [163-4, 440]. Exhibited at Amsterdam, 1872 and 1898, No. 44; Brussels, 1882, No. 216; The Hague, 1890, No. 85; Utrecht, 1894, No. 417. In the Van Weede van Dijkveld collection, Utrecht. Exhibited on loan since 1896 in the Rijksmuseum, Amsterdam, 1911 catalogue, No. 2022.

The painting was researched in the 20th century by Isa van Eeghen who discovered that it was a portrait of Maria Trip, the wife of Balthasar Coymans.

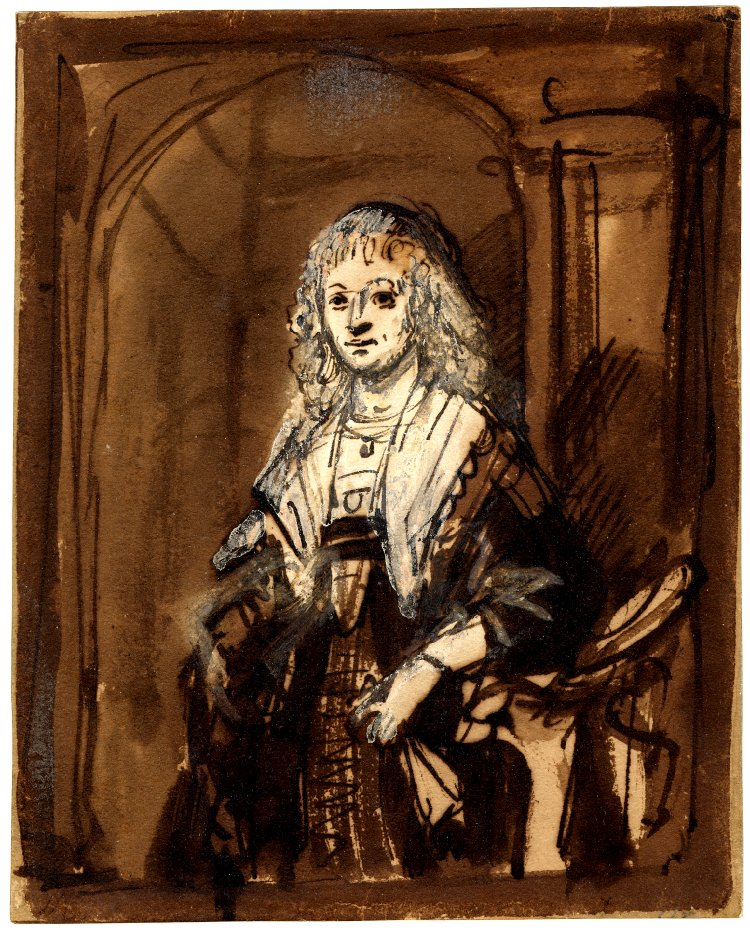
Sketch from the British Museum

== See also ==
- List of paintings by Rembrandt
