= Rembrandt's Mughal drawings =

Series of illustrations by Rembrandt

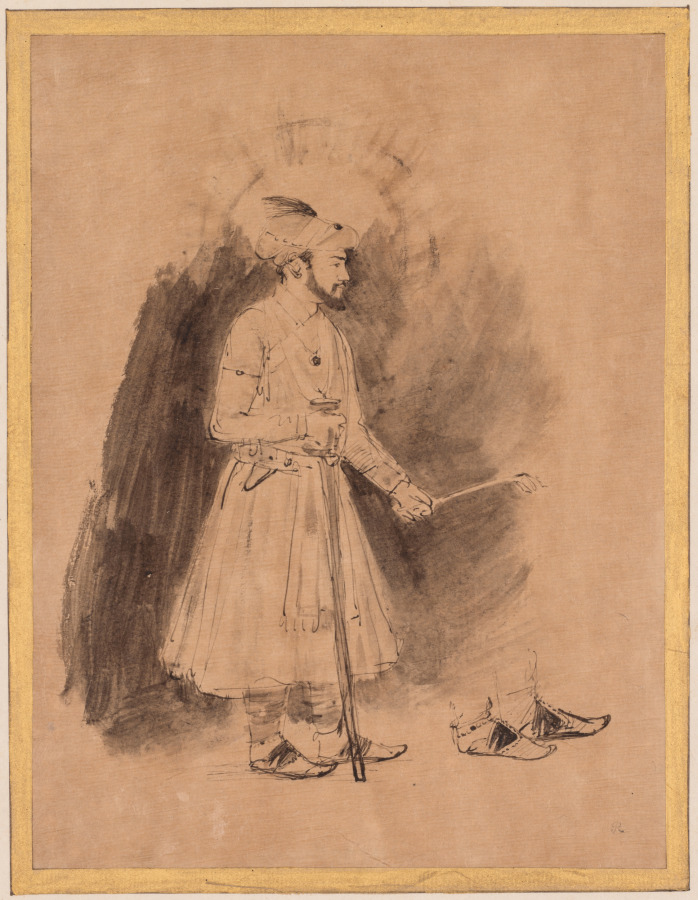
Shah Jahan (Mughal Emperor) by Rembrandt van Rijn, c. 1656–1661

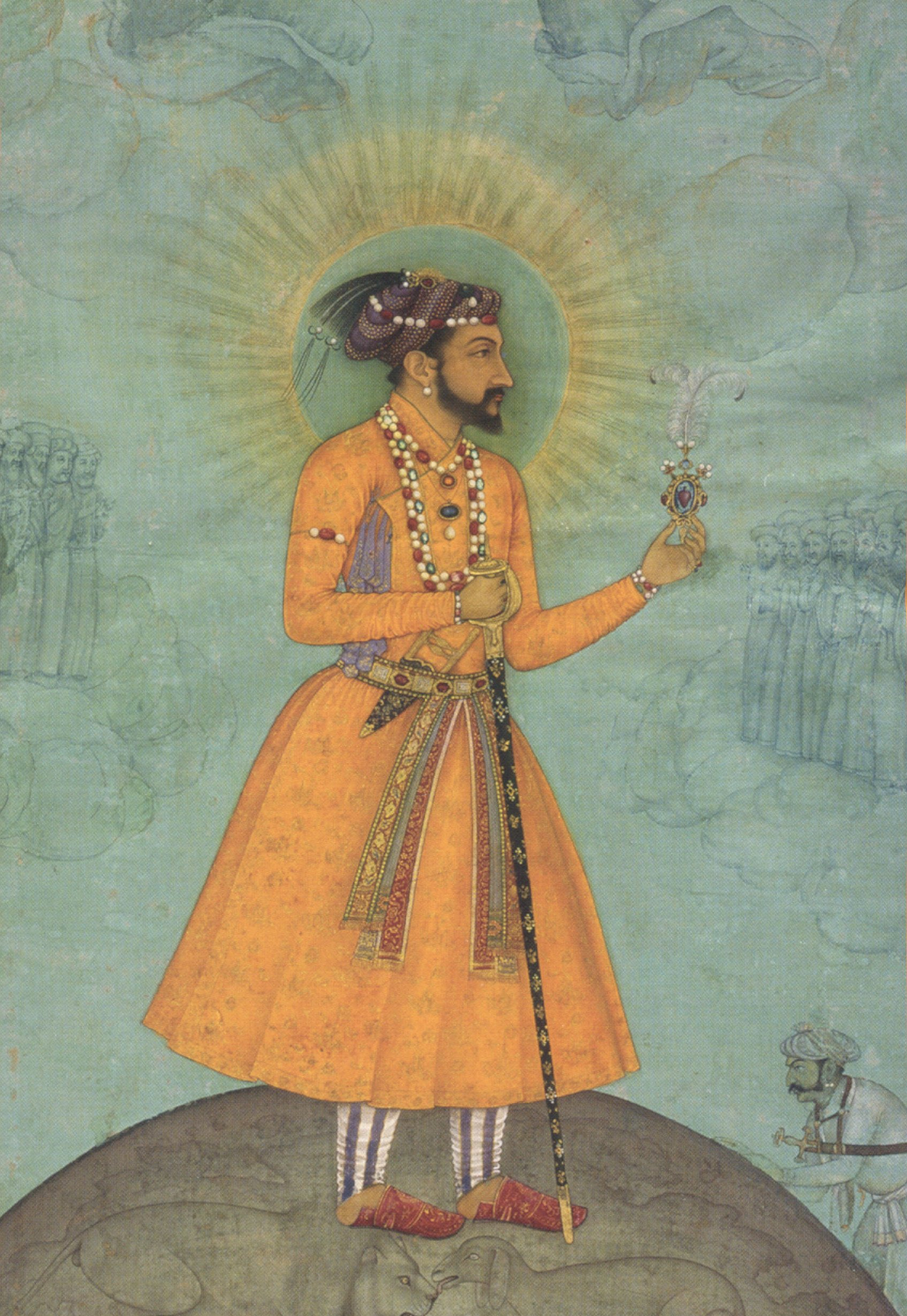
Jujhar Singh Bundela Kneels in Submission to Shah Jahan by Bichitra, c. 1630

A Rembrandt Drawing Inspired by a Mughal Miniature

In his late career in the 1650s, the Dutch artist Rembrandt created drawings that were inspired by miniatures from Mughal India. This was the only time the artist engaged with the artistic style of a "dramatically foreign culture". They depict Mughal emperors, noblemen, courtiers, and sometimes women and common folk. They were executed on expensive Asian or Japanese paper, and only 23 drawings survive today.

The early 1600s witnessed a growth in trade between Mughal India and the Dutch East India Company, and many artists, including Rembrandt, were exposed to Indian objects and works of art for the first time. Rembrandt's Mughal drawings were a result of this cultural exchange that occurred due to global trade.

The drawings are not strictly copies of Mughal paintings, and it is not known whether they were intended for personal use or were commissions. This departure in his oeuvre has been interpreted as Rembrandt's way of reinventing himself as an artist during a low point in his late career, when he faced bankruptcy. In 2005, Dr. Marian Bisanz-Prakken of Albertina wrote: "It is supposed that Rembrandt's creative examination of the Mughal miniatures may have exerted some influence on the pen and wash style of his late drawings."

== History and context ==
Once the Dutch East India Company was established in 1602, Amsterdam witnessed the growth of an international market where goods from across the world were traded. Rembrandt benefitted from this global exposure that enabled him to buy "drawings and prints from the principal masters of the whole world". His inventory included Chinese, Turkish and Mughal Indian artefacts. The latter was the inspiration for his late-career Mughal drawings, which marked a significant departure from his usual style and subjects.

In 1656, following Rembrandt's bankruptcy, an inventory of his possessions showed that he owned an album of "curious miniature drawings", which are believed to be Indian Mughal miniatures. Stephanie Schrader, who curated Rembrandt and the Inspiration of India and has extensively studied the drawings, states that Rembrandt's creation of these drawings at this low point in his career could have been a way of re-establishing himself as an artist who is aware of prevailing international styles.

The first public record comes from a 1747 sale catalogue of Jonathan Richardson that states: "A book of Indian Drawings, by Rembrandt, 25 in number." Rembrandt is believed to have made many drawings after contemporary Indian paintings and miniatures, but only 23 survive today. The exact sources for the drawings are not known. Whether these were commissioned or meant for personal use is not verifiable either.

== Style and technique ==
Rembrandt's drawings were not strict imitations of Mughal works. Although Indian miniatures were executed in rich colours, Rembrandt's drawings take a more restrained approach, focusing more on the shape of the figures and their "exotic" facial features and attire. He also introduced perspective and shading, elements not found in Mughal miniatures. Unlike the miniatures, which were often in profile, the drawings convey a sense of movement and make apparent the distribution of body weight.

While most of the drawings depict Indian royalty or noblemen, a few represent the common people or women. All drawings are made on 'Asian paper', which was then imported by the Dutch East India Company and highly prized. Rembrandt's use of expensive paper has been interpreted as him holding the subject matter in high regard.

== List of 23 extant drawings ==
No.	Image	Title	Year	Technique	Dimensions	Gallery	Commentary
1		Emperor Akbar and his Son Selim in Apotheosis	c. 1656	Pen and brown ink, brown wash and white gouache on Japan paper	Height: 21.2 cm (8.3 in); Width: 17.4 cm (6.8 in)	Museum Boijmans Van Beuningen, Netherlands	
2		A Mughal nobleman on horseback	c. 1656–61	Pen and brown ink with brown and grey wash, touched with red and yellow chalk and white heightening and with some scraping-out, on oriental paper; the lance drawn with a ruler.	Height: 205 mm (8.07 in); Width: 177 mm (6.96 in)	British Museum, England	
3		A Deccani nobleman standing	c. 1656–61	Pen and brown ink with grey and brown wash and scraping-out on oriental paper prepared with pale brown wash.	Height: 196 millimetres; Width: 158 millimetres	British Museum, England	
4		A Medallion Portrait of Muhammad Adil Shah of Bijapur, Rembrandt	c. 1656–61	Pen, Brown Ink, And Brown Wash On Japan Paper	Height: 97mm; Width: 76mm	Fine Arts Museum of San Francisco, United States	
5		A Mughal Nobleman standing (Prince Daniyal)	c. 1656–61	Pen and brown ink with grey and brown wash, touched with red chalk (in the turban) and white heightening, on Asian paper	Height: 184 millimetres; Width: 112 millimetres	British Museum, England	
6		Four Mullahs Seated under a Tree	c. 1656–61	Pen and brown ink with brown and grey wash, touched with white and with some scraping-out, on Asian paper prepared with pale brown wash	Height: 194 millimetres; Width: 124 millimetres	British Museum, England	
7		Indian archer	c. 1656–58	Pen and brown ink, with brown, grey, and light brown wash and opaque white, on Japanese paper toned with light brown wash; later additions in pen and brown ink; framing line in grey ink	, h: 188mm × w: 131mm	Rijksmuseum	
8		Indian Ruler (Shah Shuja')	c. 1656–61	Brown ink and brown wash on Asian paper toned with light brown wash	Height: 23 cm; Width: 18 cm	Albertina Museum, Austria	
9		Indian Warrior with a Shield	c. 1654–56	Pen and brown ink and wash, with red chalk wash, black chalk and scraping (correction), on Japanese paper	Height: 178; Width: 100 mm	Morgan Library & Museum, United States	
10		Portrait of Aurangzeb	c. 1655	Brown ink, brown wash, black chalk and white opaque watercolor on Asian paper; later additions in gray wash and scratchwork, framing line in brown ink, mounted overall	Height: 18 cm; Width: 7.3 cm	Harvard Art Museums, United States	
11		Portrait of Jahangir	c. 1656–58	Pen and brown ink, with brown, pink, and grey wash, on Japanese paper toned with light brown wash; framing line in brown ink	Height: 183 mm; Width: 120 mm	Rijksmuseum, Netherlands	
12		Portrait of Shah Jahan	c. 1656–68	Pen and brown ink, with brown wash and opaque white, on Japanese paper toned with light brown wash	Height: 69 mm; Width: 71 mm	Rijksmuseum, Netherlands	
13		An Indian Lady	c. 1656	Pen and brown ink on paper	Height: 7.9 cm (3.1 in); Width: 7.2 cm (2.8 in)	Museum Boijmans Van Beuningen, Netherlands	
14		Shah Jahan and Dara Shikoh	c. 1656–61	Brown ink and gray wash with scratchwork on Japanese paper prepared with pale brown wash	Height:21.3 cm; Width: 17.8 cm	J. Paul Getty Museum, United States	
15		Shah Jahan and his Son	c. 1656–58	pen and brown ink, with brown wash, on Japanese paper toned with light brown wash	h 94 mm × w 86 mm	Rijksmuseum, Netherlands	
16		Shah Jahan	c. 1656–61	Pen and brown ink and brush and brown wash	Height: 22.5; Width: 17.1 cm	Cleveland Museum of Art, United States	
17		Shah Jahan, Standing with a Flower and a Sword	c. 1656–61	Pen and brown ink with brown wash on Asiatic paper	Height: 17.8 cm; Width: 10.1 cm	Fondation Custodia, France	
18		Two Indian Noblemen	c. 1654–56	Pen and brown ink and wash, with red chalk wash, yellow watercolor, white opaque watercolor, black chalk and scraping on Japanese paper	Height: 191 mm; Width: 234 mm	Morgan Library & Museum, United States	
19		Two Mughal noblemen (Shah Jahan and Dara Shikoh)	c. 1656–61	Pen and brown ink with brown and grey wash, touched with white and with scraping-out, on Asian paper prepared with pale brown wash	Height: 172 mm; Width: 214 mm	British Museum, England	
20	Image required (Private collection)	Two Heads of Women after an Indian Painting	c. 1656–61	Brown ink and brown wash on Asian paper	Height: 6.8 cm; Width: 9.4 cm	Nicolas Joly Art Conseil, Paris	
21		Emperor Jahāngīr receiving an Officer	c. 1656–61	Pen and brown ink, with brown and grey wash, touched with white, on oriental paper	Height: 210 mm; Width: 184 mm	British Museum, England	
22		Emperor Timur on his throne, after an Indian miniature	c. 1656–61	Pen and ink on oriental paper	Height: 186 mm; Width: 187 mm	Musee du Louvre, France	

== See also ==
- List of drawings by Rembrandt
- List of etchings by Rembrandt
- List of paintings by Rembrandt
- Self-portraits by Rembrandt

== Notes ==
- The information on the extant drawings are sourced from the exhibition catalogue of Rembrandt and the Inspiration of India, J. Paul Getty Museum.

== Bibliography ==
- Bisanz-Prakken, Marian (2005). Rembrandt and His Time: Masterworks from the Albertina, Vienna. Los Angeles: Hudson Hills. ISBN 978-1555952570.
- Filipczak, Zirka Z. (2007). "Rembrandt and the Body Language of Mughal Miniatures". Netherlands Yearbook for History of Art / Nederlands Kunsthistorisch Jaarboek. 58 (1): 162–187. doi:10.1163/22145966-90000746.
- Robinson, William (2018). Rembrandt's "Indian Drawings" and His Later Work. New York: Morgan Library & Museum.
- Schrader, Stephanie, ed. (2018). Rembrandt and the Inspiration of India. Los Angeles: J. Paul Getty Museum. ISBN 978-1-60606-552-5.
