= Bearded Old Man =

Drawing by Rembrandt

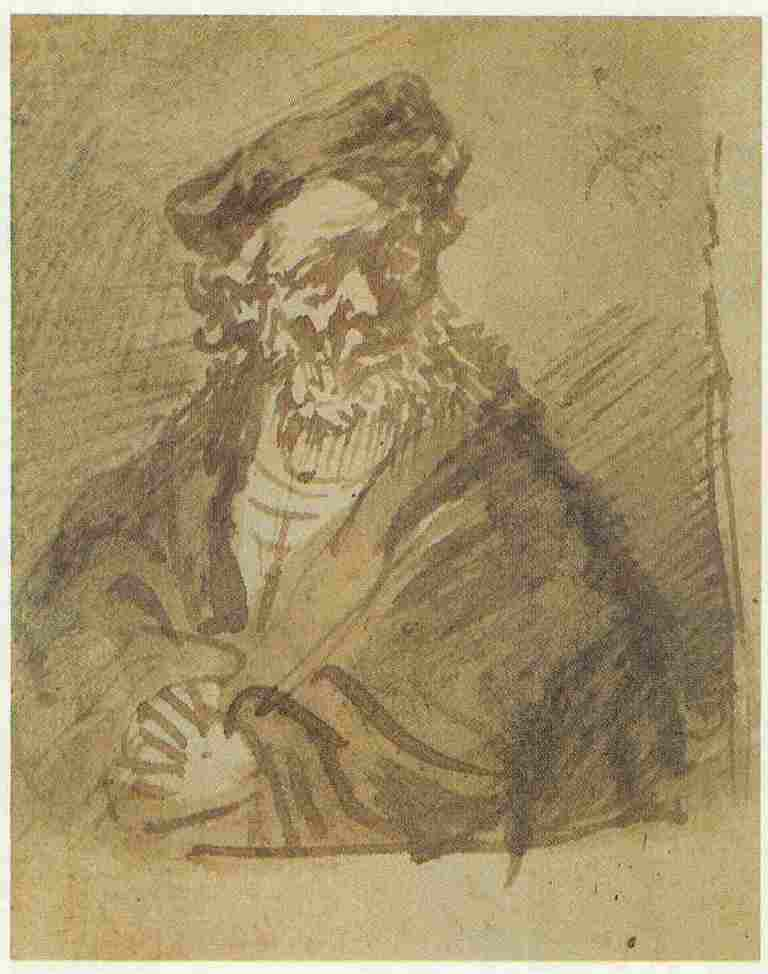

Bearded Old Man is a 1634 drawing by Rembrandt in pen and brown ink with areas of wash. It is now in the Royal Library of the Netherlands in The Hague.

== See also ==
- List of drawings by Rembrandt

== Sources ==
- Royal Library of the Netherlands
