= Elsje Christiaens =

Danish woman hanged in Amsterdam (1664)

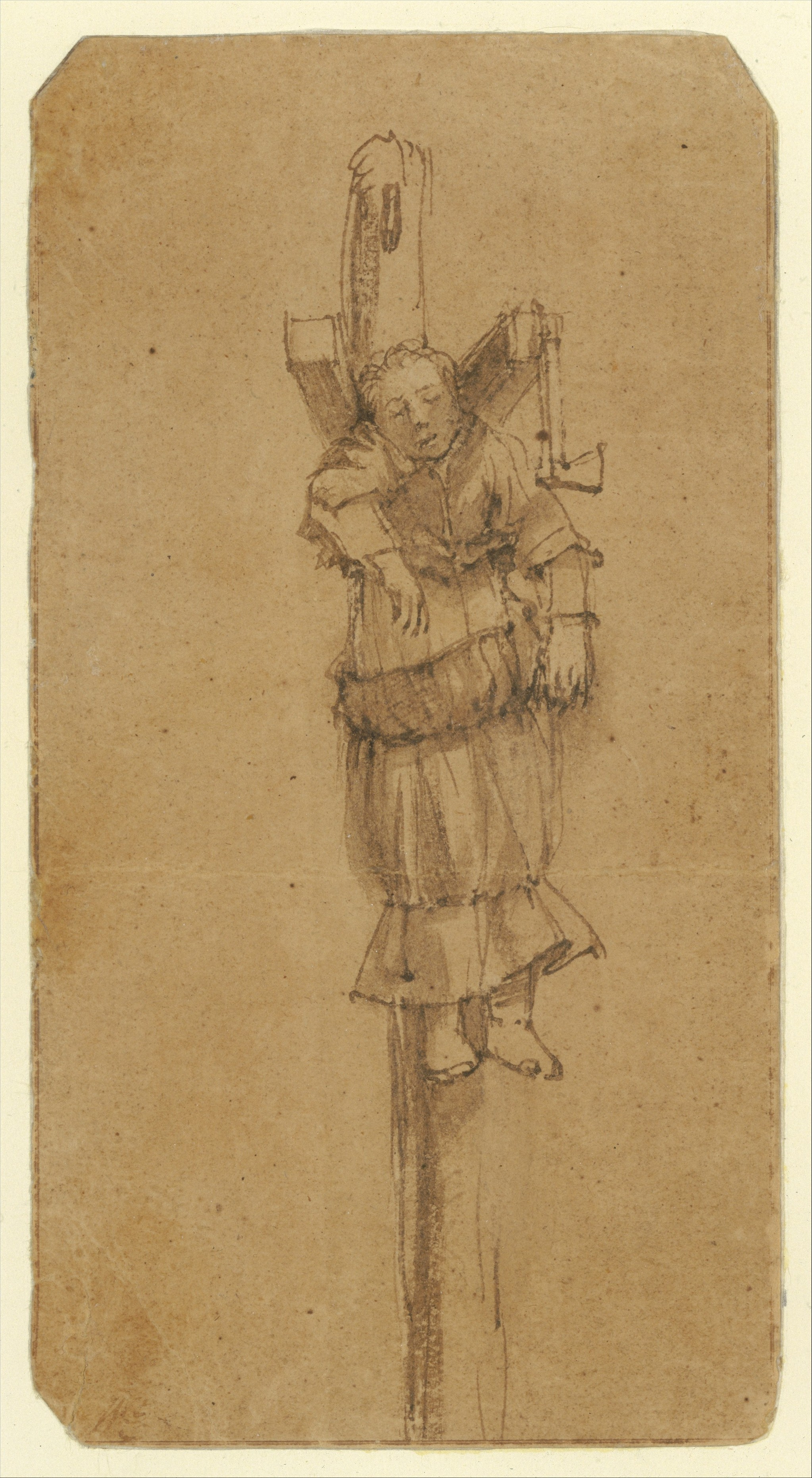
- Elsje Christiaens's body being displayed after her execution. The axe she used to kill is also exhibited. Drawing by Rembrandt van Rijn, 1664
- Born: c. 1646; Jutland, Denmark-Norway
- Died: 1664; Amsterdam, Denmark-Norway
- Cause of death: Execution
- Criminal charges: Murder

Details
- Victims: 1
- Country: Netherlands
- Location: Amsterdam
- Weapon: Axe

Elsje Christiaens(c. 1646 in Jutland – 1664 in Amsterdam) was a Danish woman who, aged 18, murdered her landlady with an axe in Amsterdam. She confessed and was executed. Her body was exhibited at the Volewijk, a field on the northern shore of the IJ, and Rembrandt van Rijn produced two drawings of it.

== Crime ==
Elsje had come to Amsterdam from her native Jutland to seek work as a maid, but was unable to find a job. Eventually she got into an argument with her landlady at the Damrak because she could not pay the rent. The fight escalated, the landlady grabbed a broom, threatening to take Elsje's few belongings, while Elsje took up an axe and killed her opponent. When a neighbour came in to find what the noise was about, Elsje took a coat and some linen out of another guest's chest and fled, covered in blood. In a possible suicide attempt, she jumped into the Damrak canal, but was pulled out of the water by passersby. After her arrest and confession, she was sentenced to death by the city magistrates.

Her public execution by strangling at a garrote took place at the Dam Square in Amsterdam. She was sentenced to being hit several times with the axe she had used before being strangled. Her body and the axe were then exhibited at a pranger in the Volewijk.

== Portrayals ==
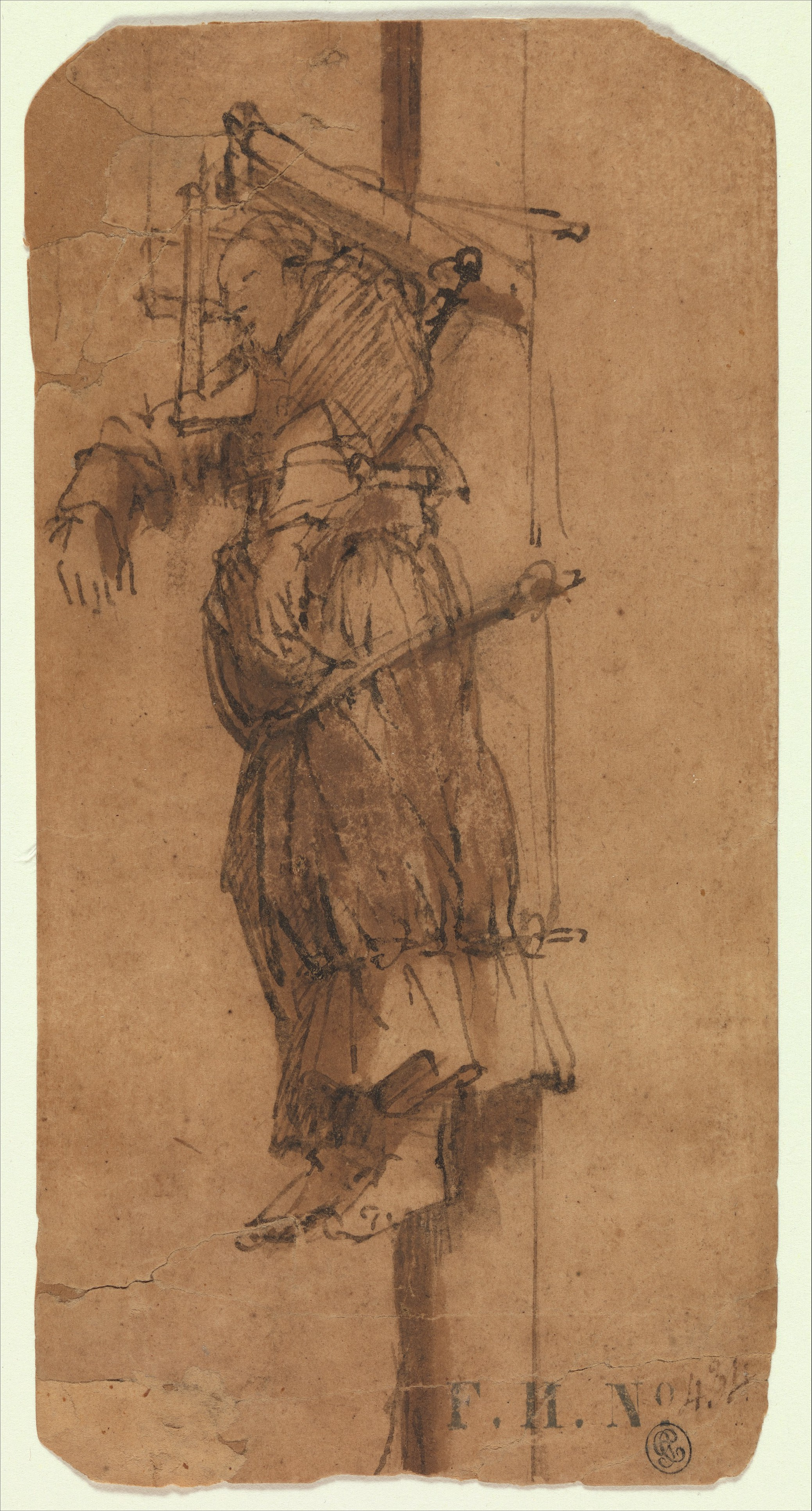
Side view

While her body was on public display on the pranger, it was drawn by the 57-year-old Rembrandt, who by then had already buried two wives and three of his children. On May 3, probably the same day as Elsje Christiaen’s execution, he hired a boat to row him out to the Volewijck moor where the body had been hung up. According to critic Jonathan Sawday, the image is unique in Rembrandt's work because though Rembrandt had long been fascinated by dead bodies, the image of the body is not contrasted with signs of life continuing around it.

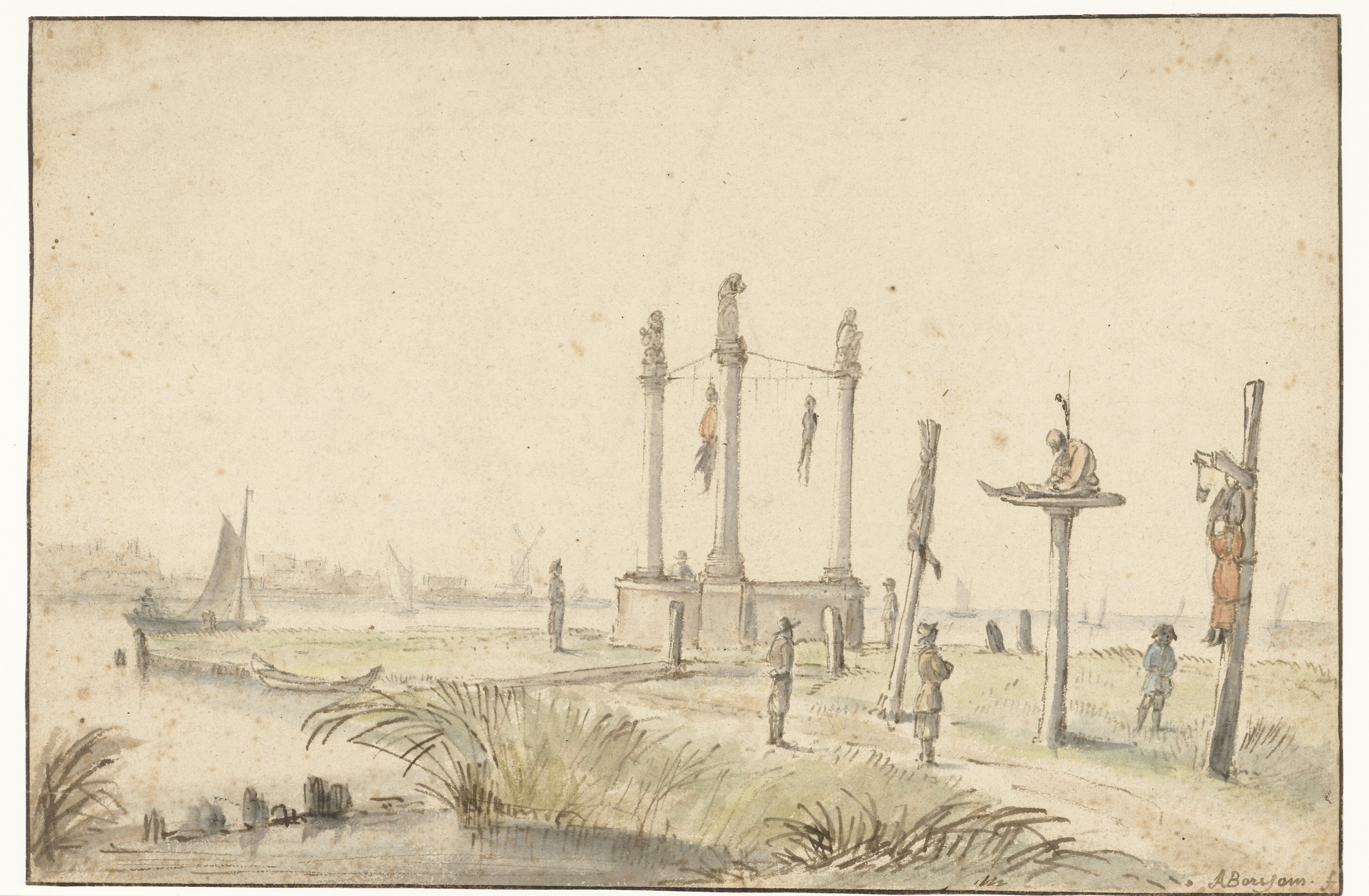
Anthonie van Borssom, Gallows field on the edge of the Volewijk, near Amsterdam, 1664. Christians' body is depicted at right.

Since this was the first execution of a woman in Amsterdam for 21 years, the spectacle was sufficiently unusual to attract public attention. Rembrandt was not the only artist who depicted the scene. There is also a pen-and-ink drawing with watercolour by Anthonie van Borssom, in which Christiaens' body can be seen hanging alongside those of other criminals at the execution site.

Before the subject of the drawings was definitively identified they were dated on stylistic grounds to 1655. The specific details of Christiaens' crime and execution, however, secure the dating to 1664 since no other body of an executed female is recorded as having been displayed in this way. The historical research was carried out by Isabella van Eeghen in the 1960s, who wrote "Elsje Christiaens, who once served as example to others to deter crime, now will serve again as example for the art historians to be careful with dating on the basis of stylistic grounds!"

The 2010 novel De schilder en het meisje ("The Painter and the Girl") by Margriet de Moor deals with the case. It connects the life of Rembrandt, trying to overcome his grief after the recent sudden death of his partner Hendrickje Stoffels, to the sad story of Christiaens and her death, which he learns of from his son Titus, culminating in a silent encounter with the girl's body.
