= Gerdina Hendrika Kurtz =

Dutch historian, writer and archivist

Gerda H. Kurtz
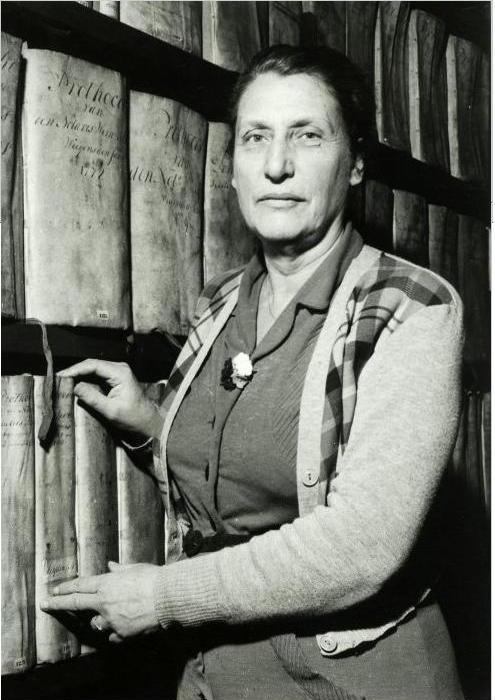
- Born: 15 November 1899; Amsterdam, the Netherlands
- Died: 17 December 1989 (aged 90); Haarlem, the Netherlands
- Occupation: Head of Haarlem City archives
- Writing career
- Pen name: G. H. Kurtz
- Subject: Various historical subjects
- Notable work: Kenu Symonsdochter van Haerlem

Gerdina Hendrika Kurtz (1899–1989) was a Dutch historian, writer and archivist. She published under the name G.H. Kurtz.

== Early years ==
Gerda Kurtz was born in Amsterdam, and moved to Haarlem with her family at age seven. She studied at a girls' school there, but her mother died when she was only 13 and she became focussed on schoolwork. She graduated from the Gymnasium and proceeded to the University of Utrecht to study History. During the course of her study she often returned to Haarlem to substitute-teach History and Geography at the Gymnasium. She enjoyed teaching, but was impatient with many of her students. She herself was a gifted student and graduated cum laude in History in 1929 (she was the 5th woman to graduate cum laude from a university in the Netherlands). She started working as a volunteer for the archives of Utrecht and passed her certification exam in 1930 as an official archivist. She continued her volunteer work and taught on the side, until she found an assistant's position with the Gelderse Vallei. Meanwhile, she kept looking for a position as archivist.

== Appointment as Haarlem Archivist ==
Kurtz graduated at the top of her class, but found difficulty in finding a suitable job. In 1913 a Dutch law enforcing the firing of women after marriage was reversed, but in 1924 a Royal decision was taken to fire all female federal government workers under the age of 45 who got married. In 1933, when Kurtz was looking for a job, this decision was extended to local government employees. Archivists either worked for local or federal government agencies, so her prospects were rather grim. The reasons for these political decisions were:

- Because of the high unemployment due to the inter-bellum crisis, women had to "make way for men" on the job market.
- Working women, once married, would use contraceptives to be able to keep up their income, and such behavior was simply not allowed by the church fathers in high government circles.

This second point made the political agenda only after more women began to work in government positions. Prior to that this point was never discussed in the legislature concerning young female farm workers or young female production workers. In any case, these laws discouraged the appointments of women in any jobs, since the expectation was that they would get married sooner or later.

When the city archivist of Haarlem died, the city council first attempted to dissolve the position completely by merging it with the city library. Protests from various groups led them to reconsider and so it came to pass that Kurtz was one of 9 candidates for the position. As a female she was low on the priority list, but she knew several influential people in Haarlem and she was the only one with the proper qualifications. After writing a letter to the city treasurer assuring him that she needed to be paid no more than 2500 guilders per year, she was hired. She held the position from 1938 until 1967.

== The Mistress ==
Six months after her appointment the archives moved to their present location in the old church St. Janskerk on the Jansstraat in Haarlem. The move itself was an opportunity to reorganize and reorder the archives and Kurtz developed her own catalog system for this. Kurtz became known as the Juffrouw, or mistress. She never married, but helped hundreds of visitors to the city archives with their research projects. During World War II she wrote a book about the history of the Haarlem archives, in which the devastating effects of the siege of Haarlem and the French occupation on the archives themselves became all too clear for her. This work probably influenced her to take many pictures of Haarlem during the German occupation, many of which have been used in scientific publications to document various aspects of the war. Not only did she take many pictures, she also hid the archives of the various Jewish organizations of Haarlem in the crypt of the Sint Janskerk, protecting them through the war years. It has been said of the North Holland archives that this was the only government institution in Haarlem without a notice stating "Jews not allowed".

== Later years ==
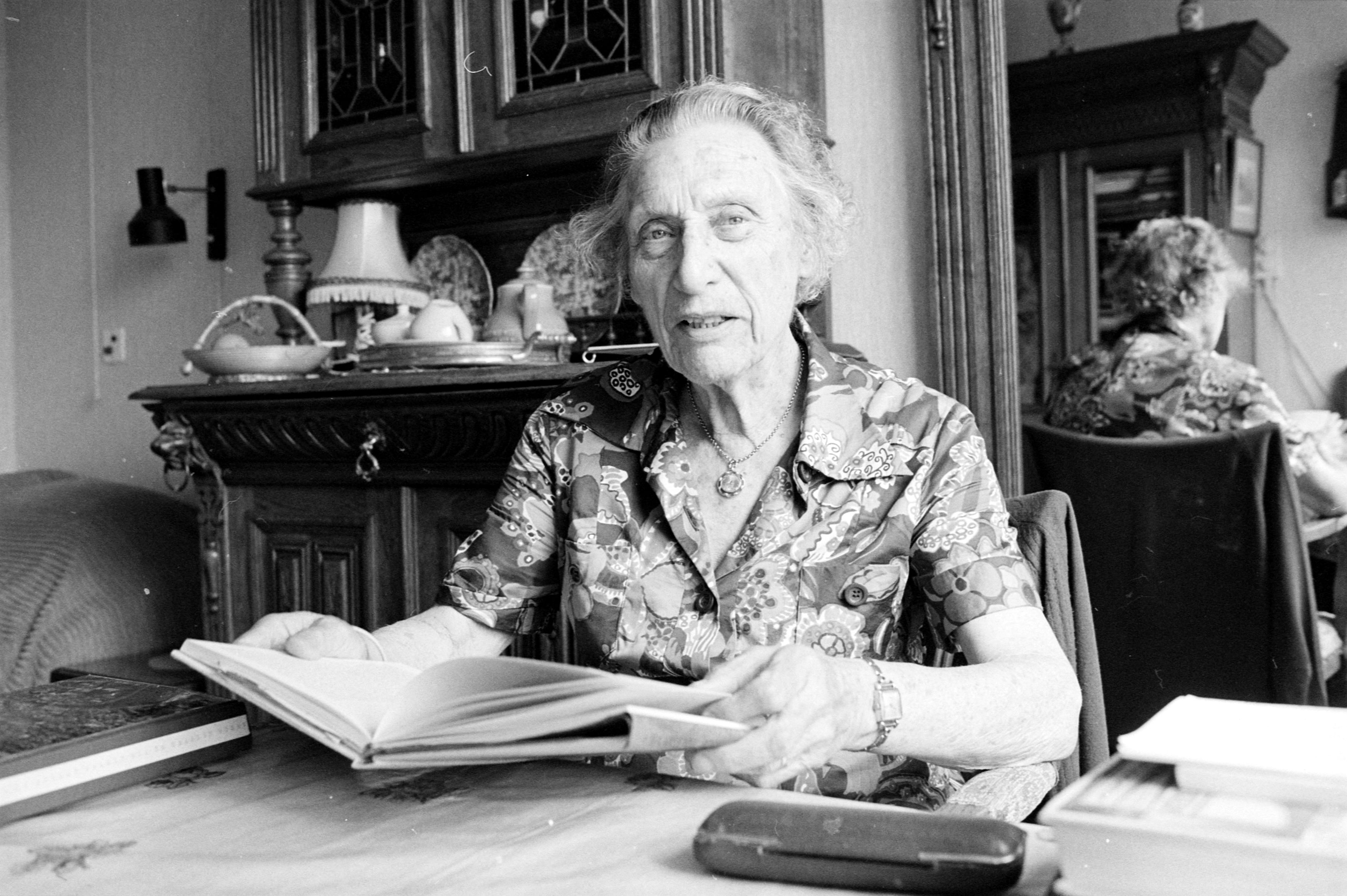
Gerda Kurtz in 1982

Kurtz published her last book at age 80 and died at the age of 90 in Haarlem of a long sickness. She is buried at Westerveld graveyard.

== Publications ==
From the moment she was appointed, she became a member of the Haarlem Historical Society and proceeded to write various publications. In her first four years she wrote ten books. Here are just some of her more popular books:

- Willem III en Amsterdam 1683–1685, 1928 (PhD thesis)
- Beknopte geschiedenis van Haarlem, 1946
- Geschiedenis en beschrijving der Haarlemse hofjes, 1951
- Honderd jaar Gemeentelijke Archiefdienst Haarlem, 1957
- Kenu Symonsdochter van Haerlem, 1956
- Het Proveniershuis te Haarlem, 1979
- De straat waarin wij in Haarlem wonen; geschiedenis en verklaring der Haarlemse straatnamen, 1965

== Sources ==
- Jaarboek Vereniging Haarlem 1989, Jaap Temminck
