= Eduard Isaac Asser =

Dutch lawyer and photographer

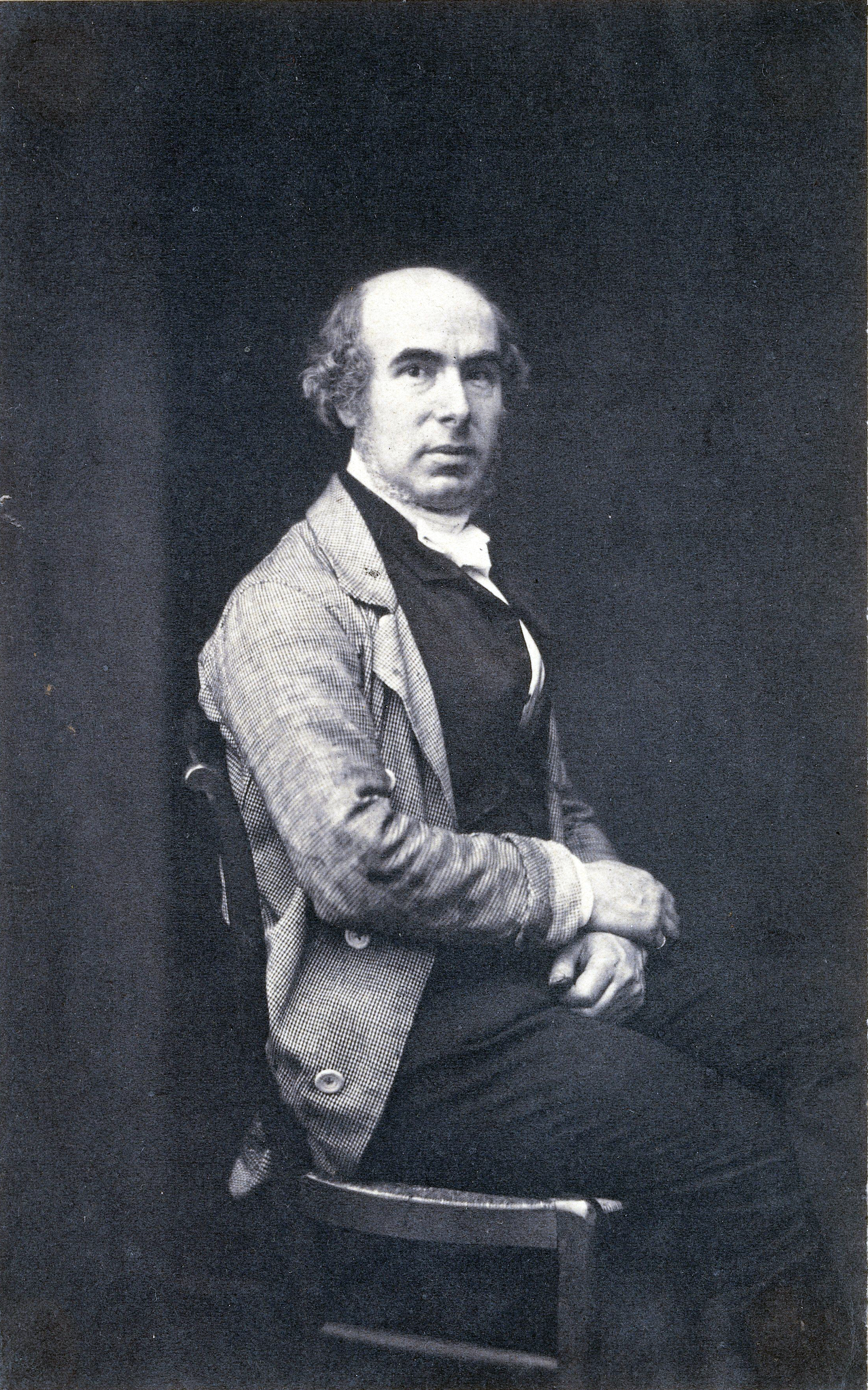
- Born: 19 October 1809; Amsterdam
- Died: 21 September 1894 (aged 84); Amsterdam

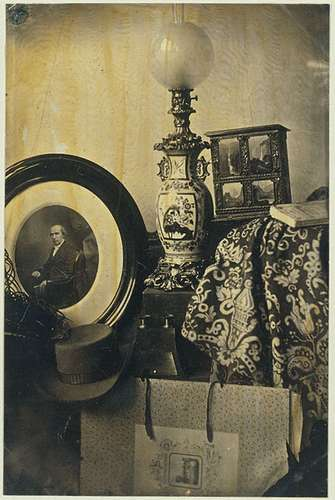
Still-life with self-portrait and his patented photolithography transfer paper, 1855

Eduard Isaac Asser (19 October 1809 – 21 September 1894) was a Dutch lawyer and amateur photographer.

== Biography ==
Asser was born in Amsterdam and became a successful lawyer and was thus able to afford his photography hobby, which was very expensive at the time.

== Contributions ==
Asser's experiments with Daguerreotype were initially reproductions of academic art. He is best known for his efforts to make the photographic printing process cheaper, most notably with his patent on the Procédé Asser in 1858, a photolithography process. He was an editor of the Dutch photography magazine and member of the Amsterdam photographers' society Helios.

== Legacy ==
Asser died in Amsterdam and he is considered the father of photography in the Netherlands. His descendants gave 200 of his earliest photos from 1839–1860 to the national collection in 1993. Since then they have been kept in the Rijksmuseum. Besides using art studio techniques for still lifes, Asser took many pictures of his family, most notably a childhood portrait of Tobias Asser.
