= Cornelia Pronck =

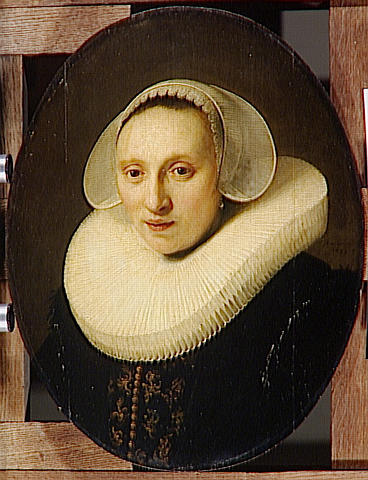
- Born: circa 1600; North Holland
- Died: 1666; Alkmaar

Cornelia Pronck (circa 1600 – 1666) was a Dutch woman known today for her portrait by Rembrandt, currently in the collection of the Louvre.

Pronck appears in Amsterdam archives as Neeltje Pronck. She married the sulpher dealer Albert Cuijper 1622. Her son Cornelis Martsz. Pronck sold a house in Amsterdam called "De Eendracht", where on 19 April 1638, the honorable Neeltge Cornelis, widow of Albert Cuijper, lying sick in bed, drew up her testament. She excluded the Amsterdam Orphan Chamber from any oversight on the estate and named Cornelis Martsz. Pronck and her brother Marten Cornelisz. Pronck as guardians of her children.

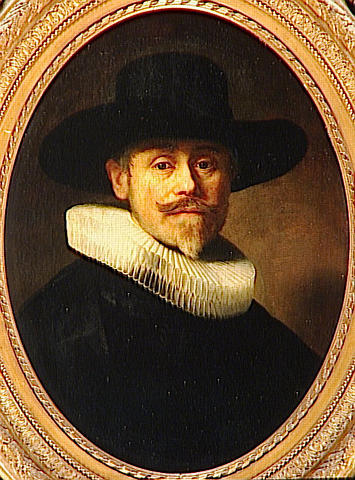
Portrait of Aelbert Cuyper, dated 1632

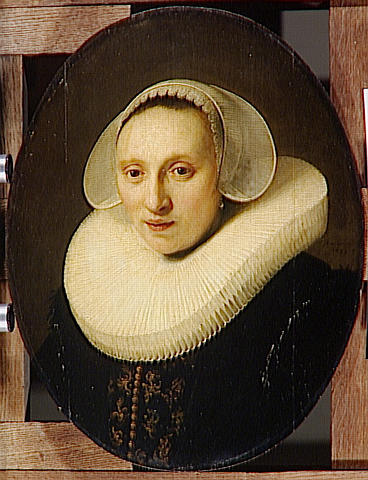
Pendant portrait of Cornelia Pronck, dated 1633
