= Cornelis Claesz Anslo =

Dutch Mennonite minister painted by Rembrandt (1592 – 1646)

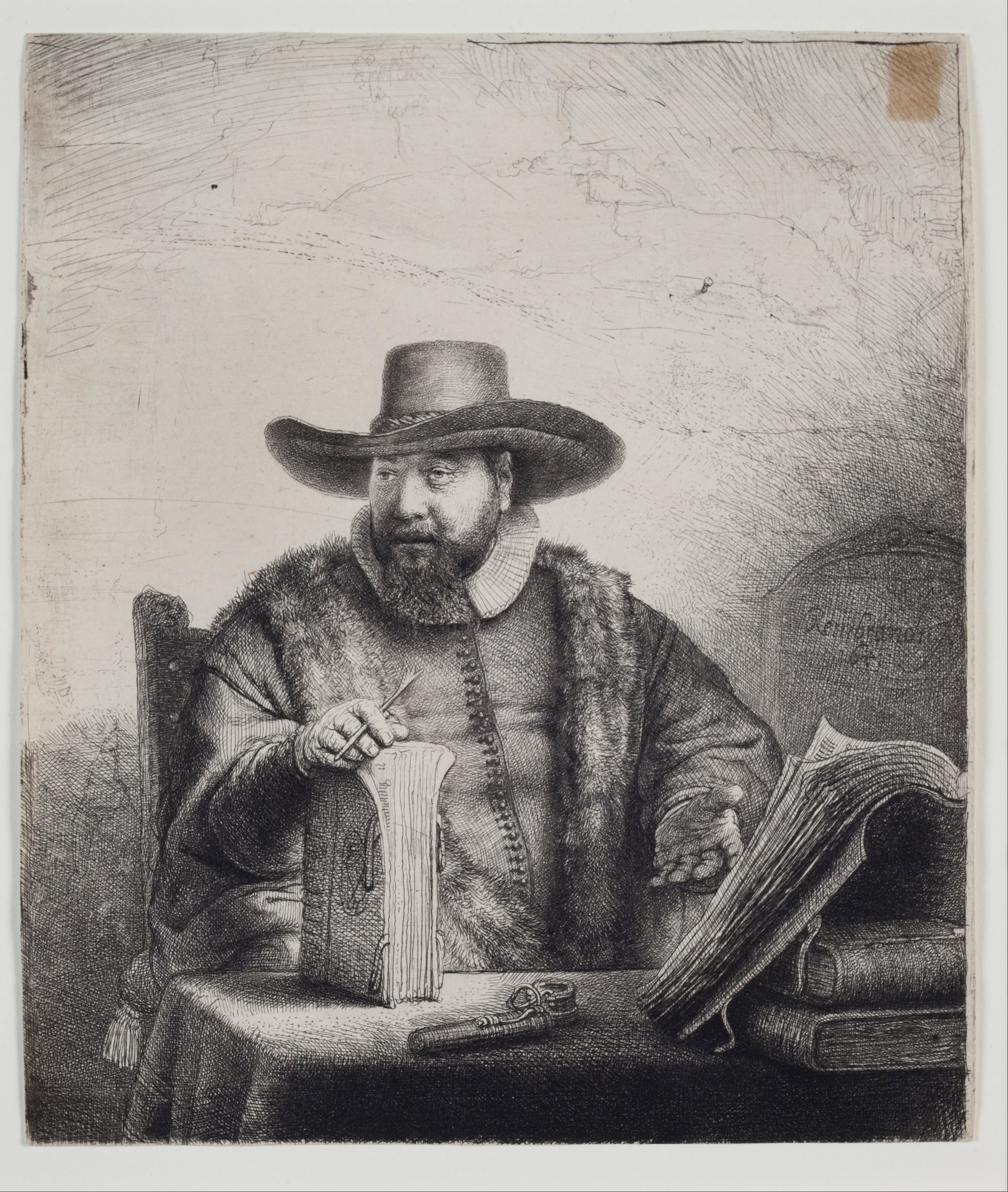
- Etched portrait by Rembrandt.
- Born: 1592; Amsterdam
- Died: 1646 (aged 53–54); Amsterdam

Cornelis Claesz Anslo (1592 – 1646) was a Dutch Mennonite minister, known best today for his portraits by Rembrandt.

== Biography ==
Anslo was born in Amsterdam as the fourth son of the Norwegian born Dutch cloth merchant Claes Claesz. Anslo (from Oslo). His older brothers Claes, Jan, and Reyer all became syndics of the drapeniers guild. His brother Reyer's son Reynier or Reyer became a poet. Cornelis married Aeltje Gerritsdr. Schouten in 1611 and was called 14 July 1617 to the Mennonite group in Amsterdam known as the Waterlanders. The poet Joost van den Vondel was deacon of his church and wrote a poem in his honor, mentioning Rembrandt, who portrayed him several times in drawings and etchings. Vondel wrote a wedding poem for Anslo's son Gerbrand Cornelisz. Anslo when he became engaged to Abigel Schouten on 20 March 1636. Vondel also wrote a wedding poem for Anslo's granddaughter Alida on 28 September 1658. Alida married Michael Blok, the brother of Agnes Block, Vondel's niece with whom he spent much of his time in his later years.

Anslo's father founded a hofje in Amsterdam that the Anslo brothers managed during their lifetime. The hofje was partially demolished and rebuilt on the original location, today's Eglantierstaat 52. Anslo became a pamphleteer during the 1625-1628 Amsterdam Mennonite conflict between Nittert Obbes, Hans de Ries and others and published an anonymous pamphlet as an attempt to prevent a schism.

Anslo died in Amsterdam.

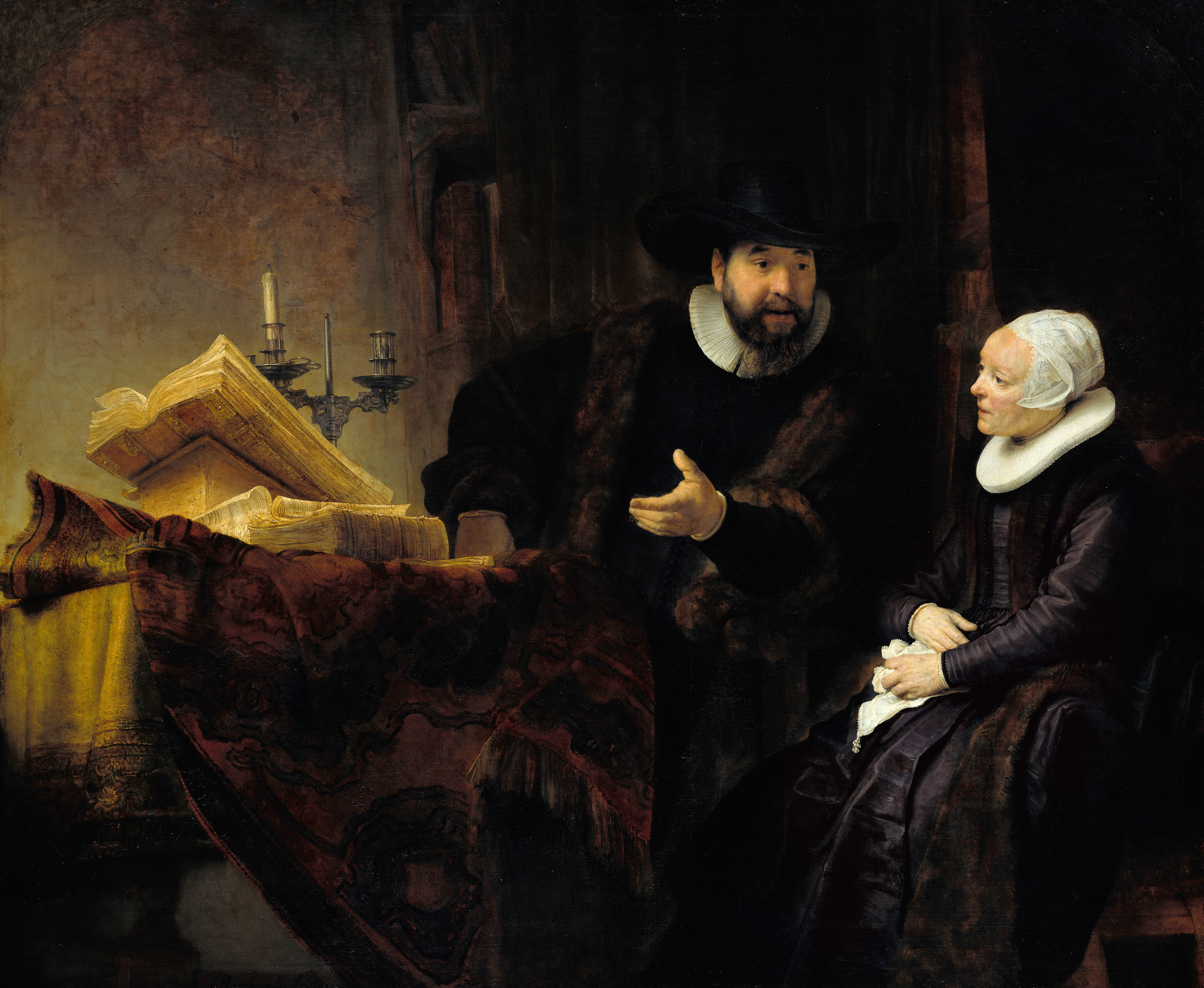
Portrait of Anslo and his wife, by Rembrandt.

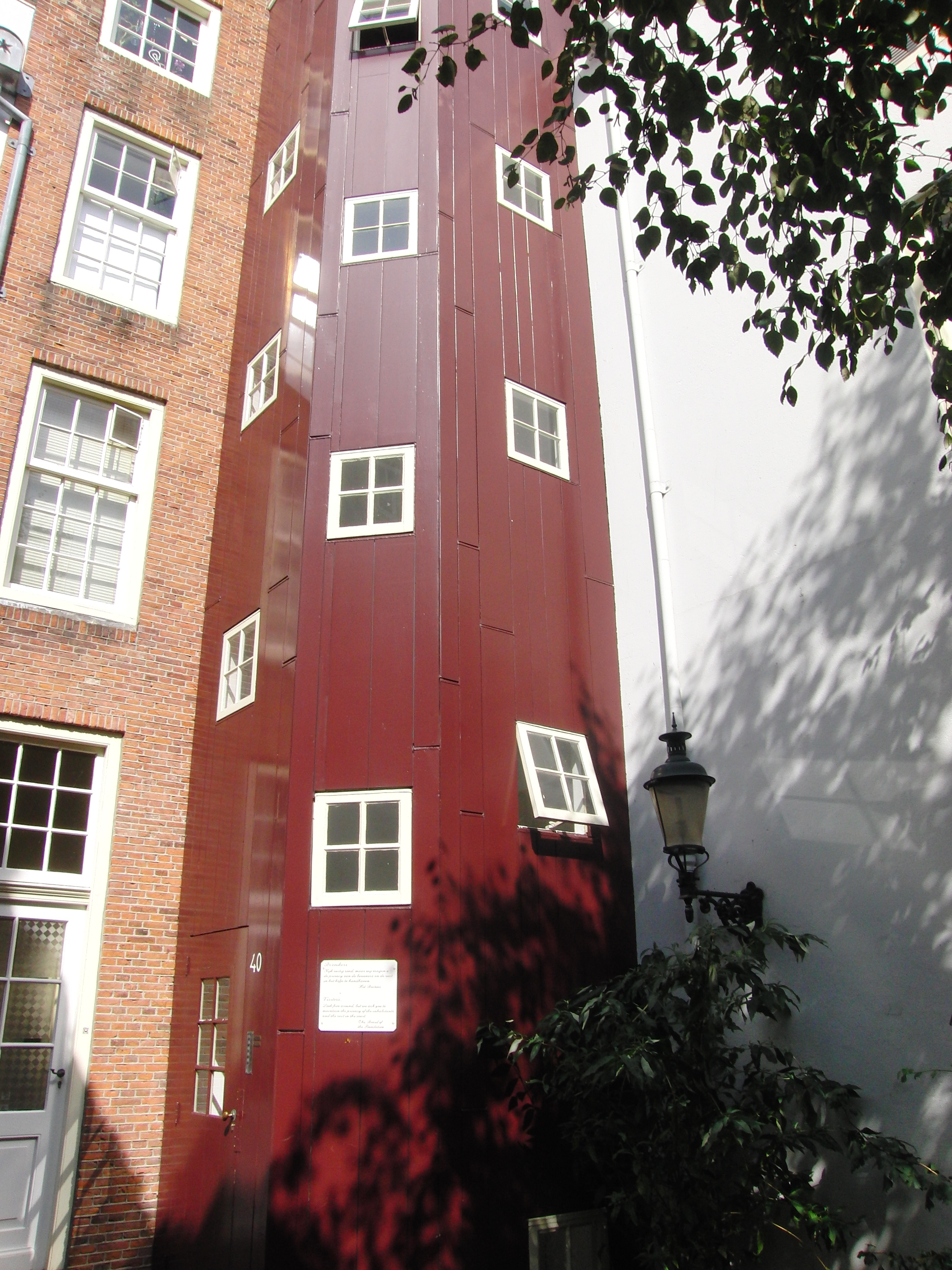
Anslo hofje
