= Bancroft's School =

Public school in Woodford Green, Greater London

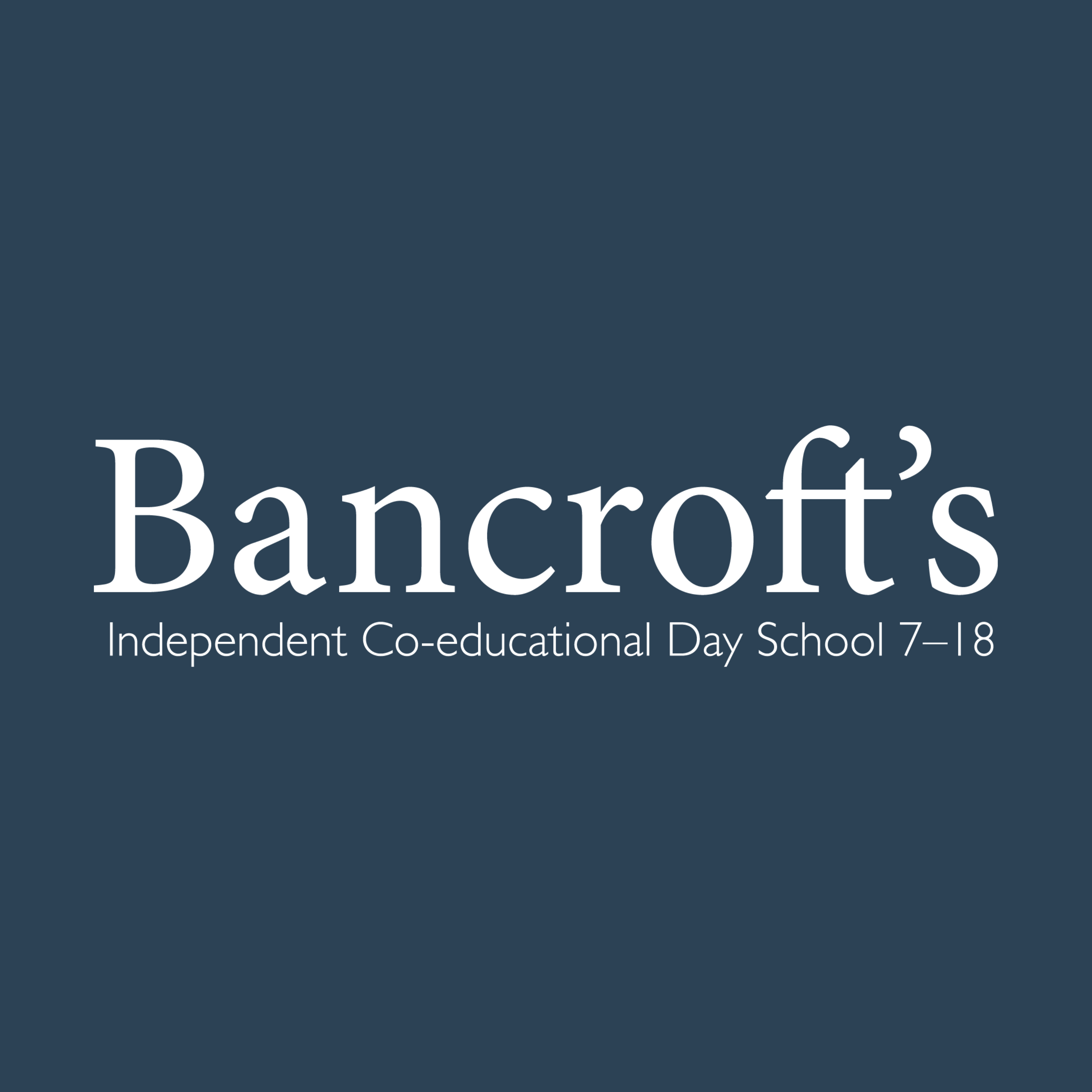

Location
- High Road; Woodford Green, London, IG8 0RF; England; 51°37′11″N 0°01′36″E

Information
- Type: Private day school Public School
- Motto: Unto God Only Be Honour and Glory
- Religious affiliation: Church of England
- Established: 1737; 289 years ago
- Founder: Francis Bancroft
- Local authority: Redbridge
- Department for Education URN: 102875 Tables
- Chairman of governors: Sir Andrew Ford
- Head: Alex Frazer
- Staff: c. 350
- Gender: Co-educational
- Age: 7 to 18
- Enrolment: 1130 (including 250 in the preparatory school)
- Houses: North; East; West; School
- Colours: Navy Blue, Gold, Black
- Alumni: Old Bancroftians
- Website: http://www.bancrofts.org/

Bancroft's School is a co-educational private day school in Woodford Green, London. The school has around 1,150 pupils aged between 7 and 18, around 250 of whom are pupils of the Preparatory School and 850 of whom are pupils of the Senior School.

The school's alumni, called "Old Bancroftians", include naturalists, poets, academics, politicians, authors, sportsmen, actors, and military figures. These include two recipients of the Victoria Cross, Britain's highest military award for gallantry, Robert Edward Cruickshank and Augustus Charles Newman. More recently, alumni have included Lord Pannick KC, Mike Lynch, Alan Davies, Hari Kunzru, Anita Anand and Andy Saull.

In September 2026 Bancroft's school joined St Aubyn's School and Woodford Green Preparatory School to form the Bancroft’s Family of Schools.

== History ==
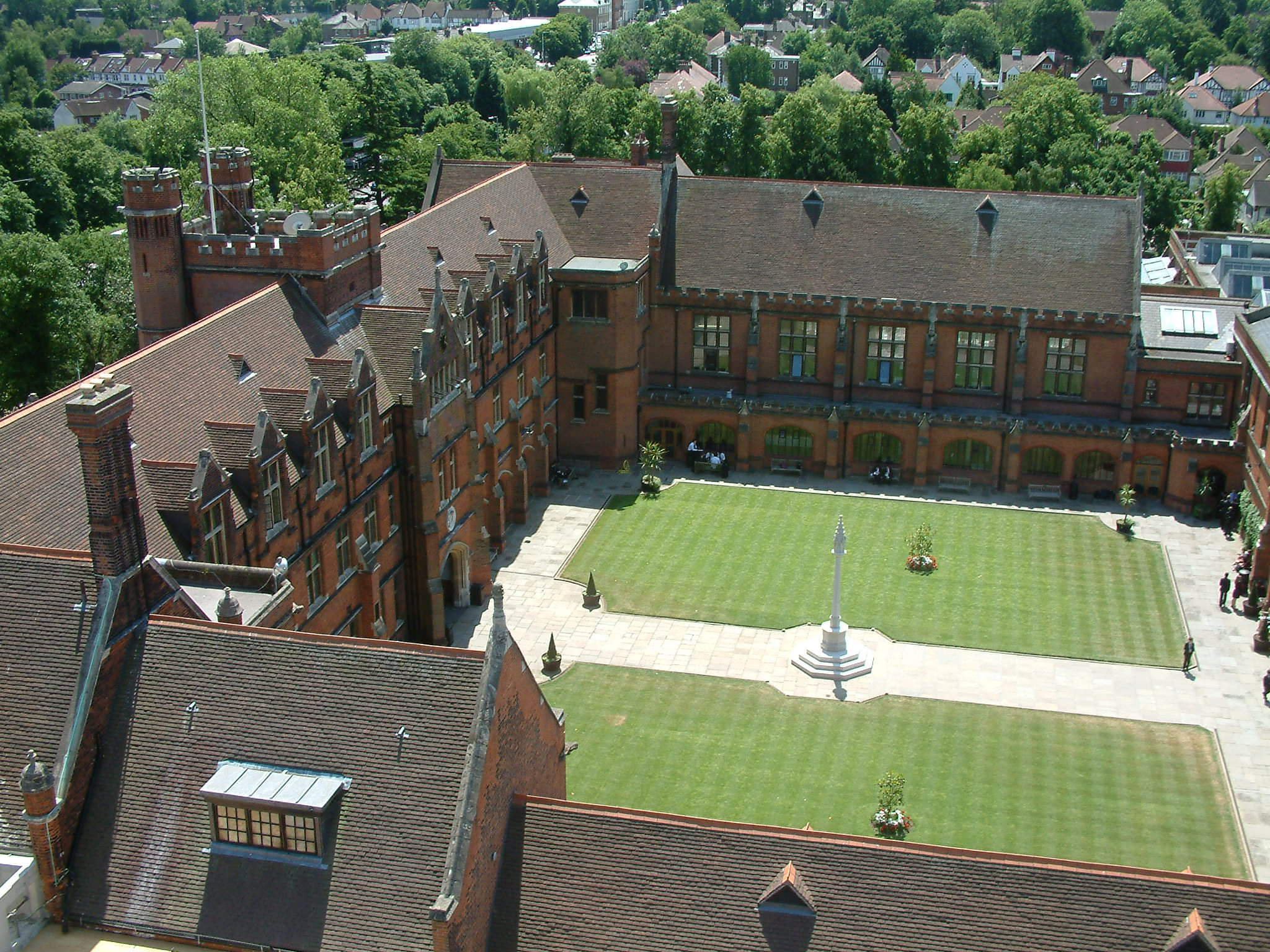
Bancroft's School in Woodford Green

The school was founded in 1737, following the death in 1728 of Francis Bancroft, who bequeathed a sizeable sum of money to the Drapers' Company, which continues to act as trustee for the school and as its governors. Bancroft's began in the Mile End Road in London's East End as a small charitable day school for boys, with an attached almshouse.

The foundation was originally known as Bancroft's Hospital and, until the late 19th century, also acted as a home for almsmen who had been freemen of the Company of Drapers. In 1884, the almshouse was abolished, and the school moved to a new site at Woodford Green, and the original buildings were demolished; the site is now occupied by Queen Mary, University of London.

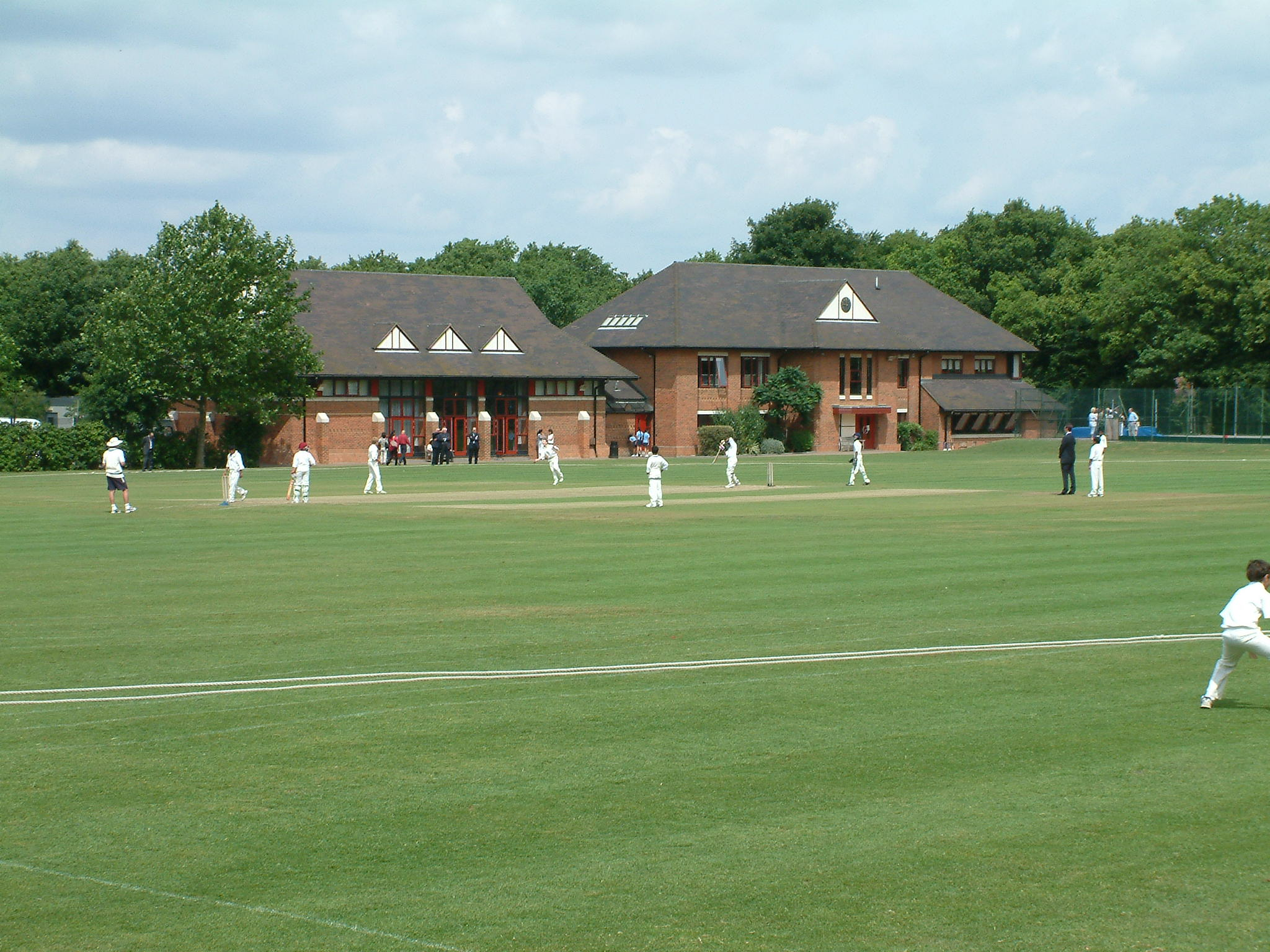
A school cricket match in front of the prep school

The current school location in Woodford Green occupies four and a half acres on the main site and a further 17 acres of off-site facilities. The main buildings were designed by Arthur Blomfield, who was also responsible for Selwyn College in Cambridge. Originally, there were just a hundred pupils, including sixty boarders. The numbers grew steadily during the twentieth century until there were nearly one thousand on the roll. The buildings were also extended, with the original Science Block (1910) then further extended (1969/70 and officially opened by Solly Zuckerman, Baron Zuckerman), the Great Hall (1937), the Adams Building (Music Block) (1964), a new Gymnasium Block (1975), the Preparatory School (1990), the Courtyard Building (2006), new Sports Block (2007), and Preparatory School Extension (2009).

Following the Education Act 1944, Bancroft's became a direct grant grammar school. However, the removal of this status in the 1970s prompted the governors to decide on three courses of action: to discontinue boarding, to admit girls for the first time and become fully independent. Some years later the decision was also taken to build a new preparatory school. These were all completed by 1990; the school now takes half its pupils from age 7, and half the pupils are now girls. In 1997, the government abolished the Assisted Places Scheme, which had helped children from poor families to attend the school; the governors replaced these by Francis Bancroft Scholarships, which were supported by the Drapers' Company and by the residue of Francis Bancroft's original will.

Mary Ireland became head in January 2008, succeeding Peter Scott. It was announced in October 2015 that Ireland would be succeeded by Simon Marshall as head following the 2015–2016 academic year.

The school team won the Kids' Lit Quiz in 2009 at the world final in South Africa.

In September 2023, head Simon Marshall announced to the school that he would be retiring at the end of the 2023-2024 academic year. In September 2024 Alex Frazer became head of Bancroft's.

== Preparatory School ==
Bancroft's Preparatory School

Information
- Type: Preparatory day school
- Established: 1990
- Department for Education URN: 132134 Tables
- Head: Joe Layburn
- Gender: Coeducational
- Age: 7 to 11
- Enrolment: 200~
- Website: http://www.bancrofts.org/index.php/prep-school

The Preparatory School was founded in 1990 after the senior school had converted from a direct grant grammar to an independent school. Unlike most traditional preparatory schools, the final year is Year 6 (age 11) and not Year 8 (age 13).

== Curriculum ==
For the first two years, students study the following subjects: English, Maths, Spanish, German, Combined Science, Drama, Religious Studies, Geography, Learning for Life, History, PE, Games, Music, Design & Technology and Art.

In the Removes year (Year 8), students choose two languages to study out of French, German, Spanish, and Russian, and also study Latin.

In the Lower Fourth year (Year 9) students choose three subjects from Latin, Classics, Ancient Greek, Russian, French, Spanish and German and two subjects from Art, Music, Design & Technology, Drama and Computer Science.

At GCSE level, all pupils take the following core subjects: English Language, English Literature, Mathematics, Physics, Chemistry, and Biology. Four additional subjects are chosen from the following, one of which must be a language: Art, Design & Technology, Music, Spanish, German, French, Russian, Latin, Classical Civilisation, Classical Greek, Religious Studies, Physical Education, Drama, Computer Science, Geography, and History.

The school follows the IGCSE syllabi in Mathematics and English. Around a third of pupils take Mathematics a year early, going on to do an FSMQ in Additional Mathematics in the Fifth Form.

A-Level students choose three, or sometimes four of the subjects offered by the school: Art, Biology, Business Studies, Chemistry, Classical Civilisation, Classical Greek, Computer Science, Design Technology, Drama, Economics, English Literature, French, Geography, German, History, Latin, Mathematics, Further Mathematics, Music, Politics, Physics, Psychology, Religious Studies, and Spanish.

Some students taken an Extended Project Qualification in the Lower Sixth (Year 12) along with three A-levels. This EPQ is completed at the end of the Lower Sixth.

== Heads ==
Name	Joined	Left	Reference
Herbert Clement Playne	1906	1931	
Thomas Grantham Wells	1931	1943	
Sydney Adams	1944	1965	
Ian MacDonald Richardson	1965	1985	
Peter Campbell David Southern	1985	1996	
Peter Scott	1996	2008	
Mary Ireland	2008	2016	
Simon Marshall	2016	2024	
Alex Frazer	2024	-	

== Notable alumni ==
Name	Born	Died	Known For
Frederic Newton Williams	1862	1923	Physician and botanist
Sir Allan Powell	1876	1948	Chairman of Governors of the BBC, 1939–1946
Gilbert Waterhouse	1883	1916	Trench poet
Sir Reader Bullard	1885	1976	Ambassador to Iran, 1943–1945
Robert "Eddie" Cruickshank	1888	1961	World War I Victoria Cross
Henry Self	1890	1975	Civil Servant
Sir Kenneth Peppiatt	1893	1983	20th Chief Cashier, Bank of England, 1934–1949
Joseph Harold Sheldon	1893	1972	Physician, surgeon, and gerontologist
Edgar Middleton	1894	1939	Playwright and Author
Victor Purcell	1896	1965	Civil servant
Sir Wilfrid Percy Henry Sheldon, KCVO	1901	1983	Consulting physician; physician-paediatrician to Queen Elizabeth II
Lieutenant-Colonel Augustus Charles Newman	1904	1972	World War II Victoria Cross
Norman Suckling	1904	1994	Biographer, composer, pianist, writer on music, and educator
Sir Frederick Warner	1910	2010	Chemical engineer
Leslie Broderick	1921	2013	"Great Escape" survivor
Alan Palmer	1926	2022	Historian and teacher at Highgate School
Richard Pankhurst	1927	2017	Historian, grandson of Emmeline Pankhurst
Denis Quilley	1927	2003	Actor
Sir Keith Williamson	1928	2018	Marshal of the Royal Air Force
Fred Emery	1933		TV presenter and investigative journalist for the BBC
Sir Neil Macfarlane	1936		Member of Parliament for Sutton and Cheam 1974–1992
John F. Dewey	1937		Structural geologist, authority on the development and evolution of mountain ranges
Colin Barker	1939	2019	Marxist sociologist
Mike Leander	1941	1996	Singer, songwriter, and music producer
Alan Thurlow	1947		Organist and former director of music at Chichester Cathedral
Martyn Turner	1948		Political cartoonist
Peter Salsbury	1949		Former Chief Executive of Marks & Spencer
Peter Erskine	1951		Former Chief Executive of O2 (UK)
Peter Perrett	1952		Lead singer of The Only Ones
Lord Pannick KC	1956		Barrister and cross-bench member of the House of Lords
His Honour Judge Pelling KC	1956		Judge in Charge of the London Circuit Commercial Court
Mike Lynch	1965	2024	The first British-based internet billionaire entrepreneur
Stuart D. Lee	1966		J. R. R. Tolkien scholar and professor of E-learning at Oxford University
Alan Davies	1966		Comedian, writer and actor
David Prever	1967		Radio presenter; 4x winner of the Radio Academy Awards
Samantha Spiro	1968		Olivier Award-winning actress (Cleo, Camping, Emmanuelle and Dick)
Hari Kunzru	1969		British Indian novelist (The Impressionist)
Patrick Leman	1970		Psychologist and professor at University of London, University of Cambridge, and University of Waikato
Samantha Smith	1971		Former British No. 1 ladies tennis player
Anita Anand	1972		Radio and television presenter and journalist
Sara Campbell	1972		Freediver and former world record holder in multiple disciplines
Adam Foulds	1974		Novelist and poet
Louisa Leaman	1976		Author
Neg Dupree	1979		Comedian, writer, and actor
Russell Lissack	1981		Lead Guitarist, Bloc Party
YolanDa Brown	1982		Musician, Double MOBO winning saxophonist
Bobby Friedman	1985		Barrister, writer (biographer of John Bercow) and former Cambridge Union President
Andy Saull	1988		Rugby Player, best known for playing for Saracens F.C. and Oxford University

== The Old Bancroftians Association ==
The Old Bancroftians Association (OBA) was founded in 1892 when the Old Bancroftians' Football Club was formed, although there were already a few unofficial groups which had been around since the 1860s. The first meeting was held in 1896 at the Haunch of Venison in Fleet Street. However, a constitution was not agreed until 1909, when the first President, H.C Playne (who was also the school's Head Master), was appointed. The idea of the association was to keep young and old members together.

The association grew rapidly over the years, to a size of 3175 members in 2005, when membership for life was introduced for all Bancroftians.

The association provides a range of services for former members of the school, including the organisation of reunions and sports activities, including cricket, rugby golf, and football.
