= Zack Busner =

Zack Busner is a recurring character in the fiction of British author Will Self, appearing in the short story collections The Quantity Theory of Insanity, Grey Area, Dr. Mukti and Other Tales of Woe, the novels Great Apes, The Book of Dave, and the 2010s novel trilogy Umbrella, Shark and Phone.

== Appearances ==
As one can never tell if Self intends there to be a coherent storyline, piecing together a backstory for Dr. Busner can be exceedingly difficult. In the story "Inclusion", he is seemingly absorbed by the character Simon Dykes. While some might consider this the end of Busner, he reappears in Great Apes.

== Employment and characteristics ==
He apparently holds an institutional position in the stories "Dr. Mukti" and "Ward 9". Because his previous work is referenced throughout the latter, it can be safely assumed that these events take place after "The Quantity Theory of Insanity".

Busner has also lectured for the Royal Society of Ephemera and has written numerous pieces for their British Journal of Ephemera. It was in this publication that "The Quantity Theory of Insanity" was first published. Despite his age and failing health in "Dr. Mukti" he still provides a formidable opponent to the eponymous character. He is shown to be able to not only accurately predict people's behaviour but to use this along with manipulation to ensure his preferred outcome.

In the short story Inclusion Busner muses that although psychiatry has been his main focus, he could have gone into any number of fields and that a good epitaph for him might be "He had no interests but interest."

In an interview with DNA India, Self described the similarities between Busner and himself:

We both grew up in North London; we're both of Jewish heritage (although him more than me), we're both philosophically inclined, we're both highly sexual, we're both rebellious, we're both obsessed by mental illness (although him as a practitioner, me as a writer), we've both been married more than once and have numerous children, we both affect a certain dishabille, we both like Jimi Hendrix. The main difference between us is that he's 27 years older than me and a lot realer.

== Inspiration ==
Busner is a psychiatrist and psychoanalyst practising in London, and is prone to self-promotion at the expense of his patients. He is often the antagonist of the stories he appears in, although not always with villainous intent. It has been suggested that the character is based on the psychiatrist R. D. Laing and the neurologist Oliver Sacks.
