= Robert Edward Cruickshank =

Major Robert Edward Cruickshank VC
- Private Robert Cruickshank c. 1915
- Born: 17 June 1888; Winnipeg, Manitoba, Canada
- Died: 30 August 1961 (aged 73); Blaby, Leicestershire, England
- Burial place: Gilroes Crematorium, Leicester, Leicestershire, England
- Military career
- Allegiance: United Kingdom
- Branch: British Army
- Rank: Major
- Units: London Scottish (WWI); Home Guard (WWII)
- Conflicts: First World War; *Battle of the Somme; Second World War (Home Guard)
- Awards: Victoria Cross

Major Robert Edward Cruickshank VC (17 June 1888 – 30 August 1961) was a Canadian-born British recipient of the Victoria Cross (VC), the highest award for combat gallantry of the British and Commonwealth forces.

Cruickshank was born in Winnipeg, Manitoba in 1888, the first of 5 children. He moved to England with his family when he was 3 where he moved frequently.

In the First World War he initially volunteered for the Royal Flying Corps, but transferred to the London Scottish. After being injured in the Battle of the Somme he was returned home to recuperate before transferring to Egypt. While in Egypt, on 1 May 1918, he volunteered to carry a message along the front line where he was hit several times by a sniper. For his continued attempts at climbing the slopes of a wadi whilst wounded and under sniper fire, he was awarded the Victoria Cross. After the war he returned to business work before moving to Southend. After serving in the Home Guard as a Major in the Second World War, he served on several local organisations and committees before dying in Leicestershire in 1961. His medal was donated to his regimental museum.

== Early life ==
Cruickshank was born in Winnipeg in 1888, the first born of 5 children. His two brothers and two sisters were born in England. His youngest brother, John, died at the age of 10 in 1913, tripping as he alighted from a moving tram and fracturing his skull. He had been out shopping with a friend to buy a Scout's cape. His middle brother, Percy, also volunteered for the Army, and was killed while serving in the Royal Fusiliers on the Western Front in 1917, aged 19. He is buried in France.

Cruickshank moved to England at the age of 3; his father also called Robert originated from Aberdeen. His father had apparently been working with the Canadian Pacific Railway as an accountant. After the family arrived in England they initially lived in Islington according to the 1891 Census but by the 1901 Census had moved to Woodford. From 1903 to 1904 he was educated at Bancroft's School, Woodford, Essex. After leaving school, he worked as a travelling salesman, joining first Lipton, then the Lever Company. He was very interested in military matters and joined The City of London Yeomanry (Rough Riders), a volunteer unit 1908–1911.

At some stage his family moved to Harringay, North London, and he became involved in the Scouting movement shortly after it was established. He became an Assistant Scoutmaster in the 53rd North London Troop. He was also involved in local politics and was noted as a good speaker. He supported Percy Alden MP in several election campaigns.

== First World War ==
After war was declared, he initially volunteered for the Royal Flying Corps, but transferred to the London Scottish. After training he was initially posted to the 1st Battalion in France, where he was wounded at the Battle of the Somme in September 1916 at Leuze Wood.

He was evacuated to England, but after recovering, he was posted to the 2nd Battalion and joined them first in Salonika prior to it embarking to Egypt.

=== Victoria Cross ===
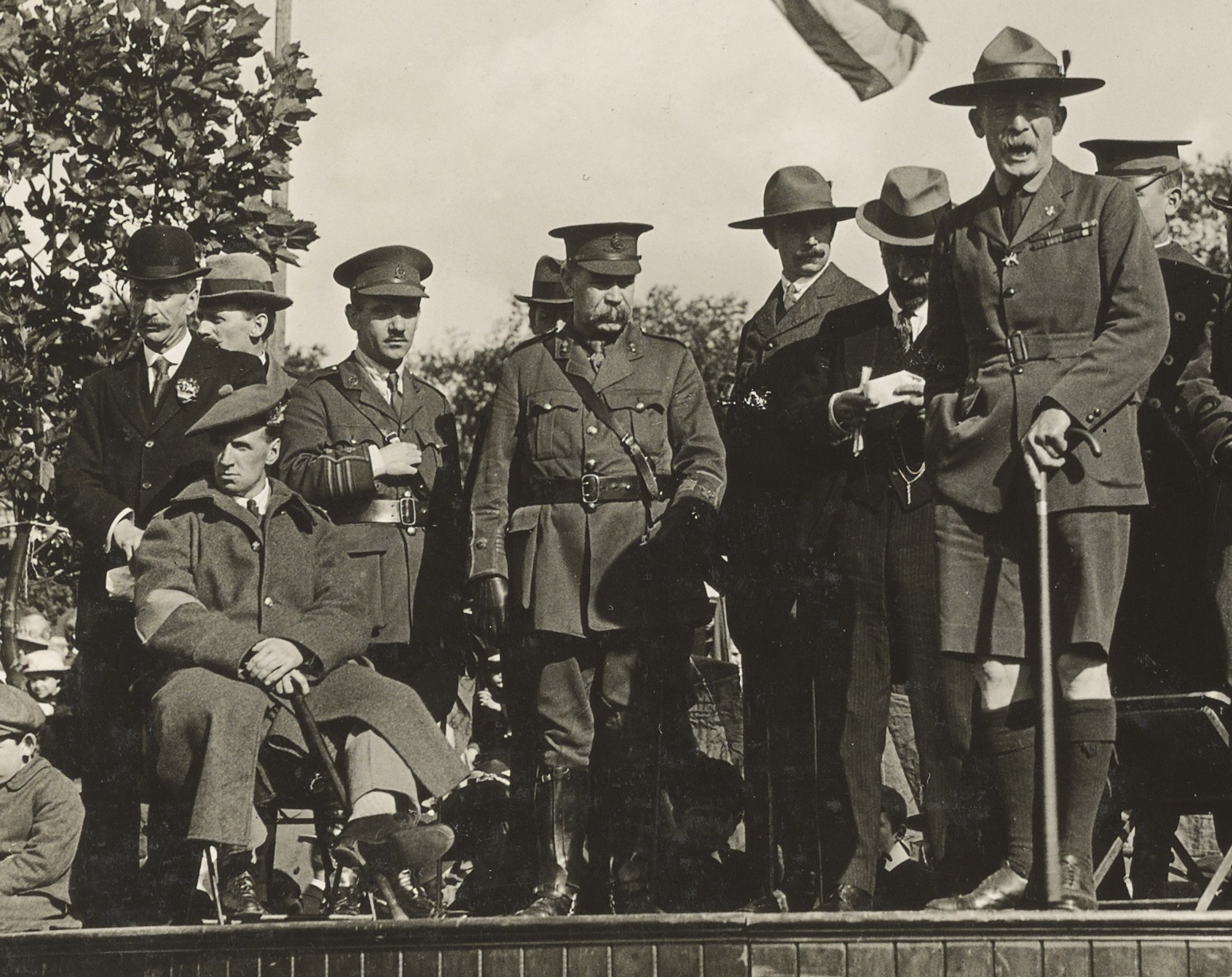
Robert Baden-Powell is speaking at a Boy Scout event in London in September 1918, where Robert Cruickshank, sitting left, is later honoured.

He was 29 years old, and a Private in the 2/14th (County of London) Battalion, The London Regiment (London Scottish), British Army when the following deed took place for which he was awarded the VC.

On 1 May 1918 east of the Jordan River, Palestine, in the midst of a pitched battle against Turkish troops, Private Cruickshank volunteered to take a message to company headquarters from his platoon which was in the bottom of a wadi, with its officer and most of the men casualties. The official War Office citation gave the following account:

The platoon to which Private Cruickshank belonged came under very heavy rifle and machine-gun fire at short range and was led down a steep bank into a wadi, most of the men being hit before they reached the bottom. Immediately after reaching the bottom of the wadi the officer in command was shot dead, and the sergeant who then took over command sent a runner back to Company Headquarters asking for support, but was mortally wounded almost immediately after; the corporal having in the meantime been killed, the only remaining N.C.O. (a lance-corporal), believing the first messenger to have been killed, called for a volunteer to take a second message back. Private Cruickshank immediately responded and rushed up the slope, but was hit and rolled back into the wadi bottom. He again rose and rushed up the slope, but, being again wounded, rolled back into the wadi. After his wounds had been dressed he rushed a third time up the slope and again fell badly wounded. Being now unable to stand he rolled himself back amid a hail of bullets. His wounds were now of such a nature as to preclude him making any further attempt and he lay all day in a dangerous position, being sniped at and again wounded here he lay. he displayed the utmost valour and endurance, and was cheerful and uncomplaining throughout. Citation for Private Robert Edward Cruickshank, Lond. R. (Harringay)

Following the action he was evacuated back to England where he recovered from his wounds, and was feted as a hero. He received his VC at Buckingham Palace on 24 October 1918, his mother and fiancée attending.

== Post-war period ==
Following the First World War he married Gwendoline Mansell and at some time moved to Southend. He had rejoined Lever Brothers, and worked for them for the next 34 years, involved with the sales of margarine. In 1921 he was one of two Lever Brothers ex-servicemen employees who won a ballot to unveil the Port Sunlight War Memorial. In Southend and elsewhere in Essex he became very involved with the British Legion, serving on several committees and acted as Chairman. In the mid-1930s work took him and Gwendoline to Glen Parva, Leicester, where they settled for the remainder of their lives.

During the Second World, Cruickshank volunteered for the Home Guard and he achieved the rank of major.

Following the war, he then served for many years on various local organisations, particularly the Glen Parva Parish Council where he served as their Chairman for 14 years, retiring only shortly before his death. He was also an active attendee at Regimental reunions, and kept close ties with former comrades. Cruickshank died on 30 August 1961. He was cremated and his ashes were interred at Glen Parva Parish Church, and his name inscribed in the Book of Remembrance. His wife, Gwendoline, survived until the age of 103. They had no children. On 29 April 2018, a plaque was unveiled in his honour at Glen Parva Memorial Gardens to commemorate the centenary of his being awarded the VC.

== Freemasonry ==
He was Initiated into Freemasonry in St Vedast Lodge, No.4033, (London, England) on 23 September; Passed, 22 October 1925 and Raised on 26 January 1926.

== Legacy ==
On his death, his wife presented his VC to the London Scottish, where it is now held in the Regimental Museum, 95 Horseferry Road, London. In 2006, the 150th Anniversary of the Victoria Cross, Bancroft's School, unveiled plaques to both his memory and that of Lieutenant Colonel Newman VC

== Recognition ==
In November 2013, Premier Greg Selinger of Manitoba, Canada announced that a lake in Manitoba was renamed Cruickshank Lake] in his honour.
