= London Cheesecake =

British pastry dessert

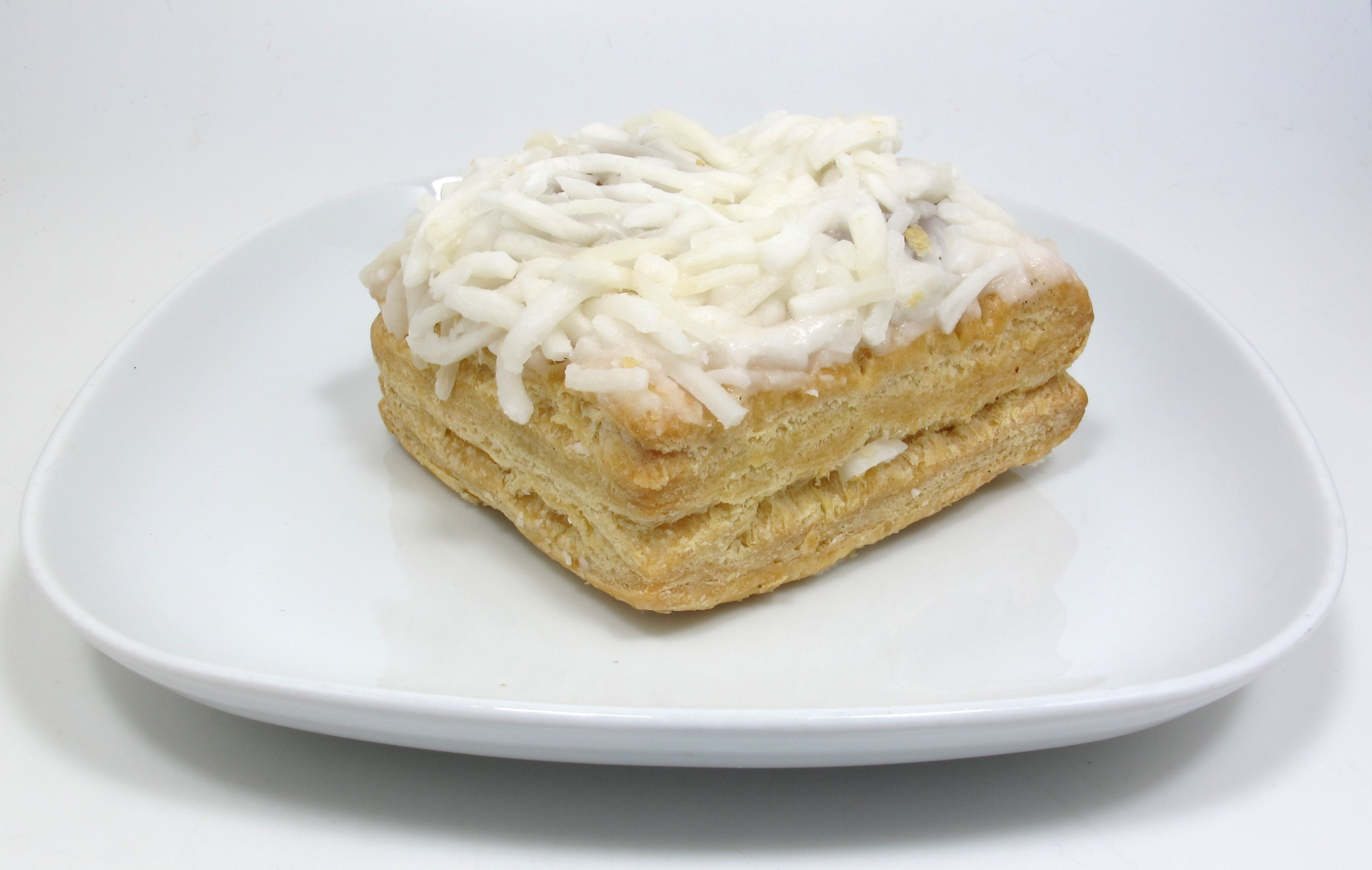
London Cheesecake

The London Cheesecake is a pastry confection that contains no cheese. It was described by Will Self in The Unbearable Lightness of Being a Prawn Cracker (2012) as "...not cake at all but rather a square of puff pastry...while so far as I could tell there wasn't any cheese incorporated into this sweetmeat, which instead was garnished with some coconut or mallow shavings."
