= Tough, Tough Toys for Tough, Tough Boys =

- First edition
- Author: Will Self
- Language: English
- Genre: Short Story Collection
- Publisher: Bloomsbury Publishing
- Publication date: 30 April 1998
- Publication place: United Kingdom
- Media type: Print (hardback & paperback)
- Pages: 244
- ISBN: 0-7475-3906-5
- OCLC: 39529277
- Dewey Decimal: 823/.914 21
- LC Class: PR6069.E3654 T68 1998b

Tough, Tough Toys for Tough, Tough Boys is a collection of short fiction by English author Will Self first published in hard cover in April 1998 and paperback in March 1999. The New York Times

== Stories ==
The Rock of Crack as big as the Ritz
Young black brothers Danny and Tembe discover the eponymous rock behind a wall in their basement. They begin chipping off lumps and selling it, slowly amassing wealth.

Flytopia
The story of a man who lives in a small countryside home. One day, while his girlfriend is away working in the city, he develops a communication with the bugs and insects that live in and around his home. They have an offer to make so that they can live in harmony with their human overlord, but it will require some sacrifice: a sacrifice that the man is only too happy to offer.

A Story for Europe
A two-year-old child begins to display a curious style of gibberish. Meanwhile, Herr Doktor Zweijerig, a German businessman, begins to collapse mentally.

Dave Too
The story of a world where everyone is Dave.

Caring Sharing
A four way love story, set in New York City, between Travis and Karin and their giant Emotos Brion and Jane.

Tough, Tough Toys for Tough, Tough Boys
Bill takes a long car journey from the outer reaches of Scotland to London, in one day. Along the route he picks up a hitch-hiker. The title of this story was a slogan for advertising Tonka Toys, and the story itself won a prestigious Aga Khan Prize.

Design Faults in the Volvo 760 Turbo: A Manual
Bill Bywater recounts the faults of the automobile, all the while failing to live his love life to the full.

The Nonce Prize
The final story returns to Danny and Tembe from the opening story. Danny is framed for child molestation and murder and is sent to HMP Wandsworth. He eventually finds an outlet in the prison English classes. His desire for redemption is entwined with his desire to win the Nonce Prize.

== Reception ==
"Mr. Self's latest book, Tough, Tough Toys for Tough, Tough Boys represents his most disciplined storytelling yet. The tales in this collection demonstrate a new control and polish, without sacrificing anything in terms of inventiveness or plain weirdness. Like his 1994 novel, My Idea of Fun it attests to Mr. Self's ability to render even the most bizarre, Twilight Zone-like events with convincing verisimilitude while enthralling – and often horrifying – the reader with his scathing, Swiftean humor." ."

While the Washington Post considered it in slightly harsher terms...

The dark devices Self relies on still bring gasps of admiration and shock, but for a successful author who has long since navigated the thicket of pubescent self-loathing there is a risk that they also serve a cynical purpose, providing cover for a failure of sustained imagination.

Two of these stories, "Design Faults in the Volvo 760 Turbo: A Manual" and "A Story for Europe", were also published in a 64-page chapbook, Design Faults in the Volvo 760 Turbo, as part of the 2005 Penguin Books 70th birthday celebration.
