= Henry Self =

British civil servant (1890–1975)

Sir Henry Self KCB, KBE
- Born: Albert Henry Self; 18 January 1890; Fulham, London, England
- Died: 15 January 1975 (aged 84); Brighton, Sussex, England

Sir Albert Henry Self KCB KBE (18 January 1890 – 15 January 1975) was an English civil servant. Prior to and during the Second World War he was responsible for arranging the purchase of American aircraft to meet the requirements of the Royal Air Force. Post-war, he held a post in the Ministry of Civil Aviation as the Deputy Chairman.

The son of Samuel Adolphus Theodore Self, a tram conductor, Henry Self was born in Fulham, London, and educated at Bancroft's School, Woodford Green.

Prior to his civil service career, he was employed as a dishwasher on the Fulham Road. During the Second World War, he was part of the British Air Commission in America. Initially he was the air representative to the British Purchasing Commission which was purchasing all kinds of armaments and war materiel in the US.

Aircraft production in the UK was nearly at maximum capacity, but additional aeroplanes could be purchased outside of the country. Turning to the United States, which was not yet at war, Self asked if North American Aviation could produce the Curtiss P-40 Warhawk under licence. North American offered to draw up a superior design to the Warhawk and bring it to production in a shorter time than setting a production line of the Curtiss design. This led to the North American Mustang which entered service with the RAF in 1941. It entered service with the USAAF being named the P-51 under U.S. Service.

Post war, Self became Permanent Secretary to the Ministry of Civil Aviation, replacing Sir William Hildred.

He was married to Audrey, daughter of Sir John Otter, at one time Mayor of Brighton, and granddaughter of the founder of, amongst others, Lancing College, Hurstpierpoint College and Ardingly College, Nathaniel Woodard. Henry Self had two sons: Peter Self (1919–1999), whose sons are Will Self and Jonathan Self, and Michael Self QC (1921–1998), who married Penny, daughter of the playwright John Drinkwater) and had two daughters.

Already a Companion of the Order of the Bath, he was made Knight Commander of the Order of the British Empire in the King's 1939 Birthday Honours list. He was invested as a Knight Commander of the Order of the Bath in 1947.

== Other positions ==
- President of the Modern Churchmen's Union
- Deputy chairman of the British Electricity Authority and Chairman of the Electricity Council and President of the British Electrical and Allied Research Association.

Government offices
Preceded by Sir William Hildred	Director-General of the Ministry of Civil Aviation; 1946–1947	Succeeded by Sir Arnold Overton
