= Phone (novel) =

2017 novel by Will Self

- First edition
- Author: Will Self
- Language: English
- Publisher: Viking
- Publication date: United Kingdom
- Publication place: United Kingdom
- Pages: 624
- Preceded by: Shark

Phone is the eleventh novel by Will Self, published in 2017. It concludes a "modernist" trilogy also consisting of Umbrella and Shark.

== Content ==
The stream-of-consciousness novel continues the story of psychiatrist Zack Busner.

== Reviews ==
Writing for The Sunday Herald, Todd McEwan wrote: "You begin to realise that this is not art, and it’s not even satire. It’s just stuff that oozes out of a writer who is floundering in the tar pit of the establishment.” Jon Day, writing for The Guardian, noted: "Phone isn't an attempt to inhabit the language of modernism but an attempt to exhaust a style. There's still plenty of fun to be had spotting references to Self's lodestars...It'll take you a couple of weeks to read all three novels properly. But I can't think of a better way to spend your time."
