= Dr. Mukti and Other Tales of Woe =

- First edition
- Author: Will Self
- Language: English
- Genre: Short story collection
- Publisher: Bloomsbury Publishing
- Publication date: 5 January 2004
- Publication place: United Kingdom
- Media type: Print (hardback & paperback)
- Pages: 272 pp
- ISBN: 0-7475-6531-7
- OCLC: 39529277
- Dewey Decimal: 823/.914 21
- LC Class: PR6069.E3654 T68 1998b

Dr. Mukti and Other Tales of Woe is the sixth collection of short stories by Will Self.

== Stories ==
=== Dr Mukti ===
Dr. Shiva Mukti is an overworked psychiatric doctor working in London. He feels dissatisfied. After an encounter with Dr Zack Busner the two begin trading patients of interest. However, it soon becomes clear that despite Busner's failing health he is determined to exact his calculated revenge upon Dr. Mukti.

=== 161 ===
A young boy on the run from a local gang enters the flat of an old man whose sight is failing. Hiding there he comes to exist in symbiosis with the old man and sees the world as he does from high above Liverpool.

=== The Five-swing Walk ===
A weekend dad considers the dull drudgery of his life as he wanders from park to park with his offspring and wonders whether he could effectively fake his own suicide to escape the machinations of the Child Support Agency.

=== Conversations with Ord ===
Two men indulge in a conversation pretending to be people that they aren't.

=== Return to the Planet of the Humans ===
A return to the world first established in Self's prior novel Great Apes and its protagonist, Simon Dykes.

== Reception ==
The Guardian newspaper said of the collection:

"Like most of Self's work, these stories detail a massive loss, a misplacement, of humanity. In some sense they are actually about being a satirist, about being able to have so removed a point of view that you might as well be looking down from orbit."

However, The Daily Telegraph review gave a harsher appraisal:

"Will Self is going through a bad patch. I thought Dorian, his last novel, was pretty dire, but this new collection of stories is even worse. They are not funny, they are not clever, they are just a mess. Perhaps one day he will recover the form which made the outrageous Cock and Bull and, in a more sombre vein, How the Dead Live, so readable; but for the moment, he is floundering."
