= Cock and Bull (book) =

1992 book by Will Self

- First edition
- Author: Will Self
- Language: English
- Publisher: Bloomsbury Publishing
- Publication date: Oct 1992
- Publication place: United Kingdom
- Media type: Print
- Pages: 224
- ISBN: 0-7475-1274-4
- OCLC: 27136296

Cock and Bull is the title of a volume composed of two novellas by Will Self, which includes the stories Cock and Bull. The two stories are characterized by empty, emotionless, phatic sex; rape; cruelty; and violence. The book was originally published in 1992 by Bloomsbury.

== Plot summaries ==
=== Cock ===
A woman grows a penis and then uses it to rape her tedious, alcoholic husband and his patronising, evangelical mentor from Alcoholics Anonymous. In the story's final twist, the woman comes into non-consensual contact with her violating member, and makes allusions to The Rime of the Ancient Mariner.

=== Bull ===
A sensitive rugby player-cum-writer for a small magazine grows a vagina behind his knee. His megalomaniacal general practitioner, having discovered the vagina during an examination, conceals it from Bull, telling him it was 'a burn and a wound', though later visits Bull at home, fixated on this popliteal yoni. The doctor, removing the bandages from the site, reveals the truth, and seduces Bull while he is traumatised and huddled beneath the sink. Gender stereotypes are examined; much fun is made of modern literary criticism and its often clichéd takes on the gender debate.

== Reviews ==
Michiko Kakutani, writing for The New York Times, wrote that "Self demonstrates an uncanny ability, similar to that displayed by Kafka in The Metamorphosis, to lend utterly absurd events an aura of verisimilitude by grounding the fantastic in the mundane. He possesses all those gifts a satiric writer might want: an eye for the telling detail, an ear for the pretensions of contemporary locution, an ability to write idiosyncratic prose that twinkles with cleverness and wit. Unfortunately, in this volume, these copious gifts are all too frequently put in the service of a misogynistic and ridiculously sophomoric vision."
