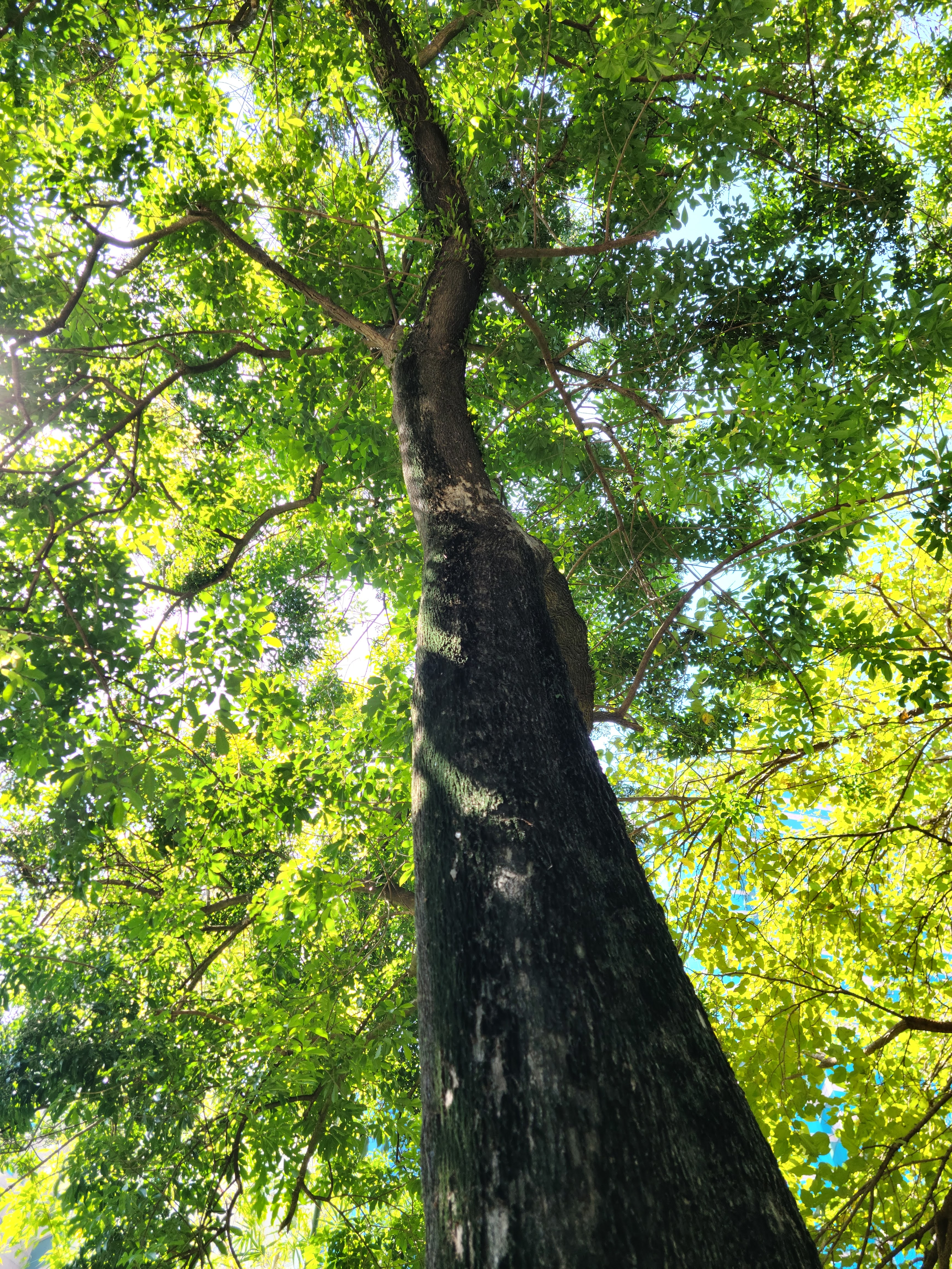

Conservation status
- Least Concern (IUCN 3.1)

Scientific classification
- Kingdom: Plantae
- Clade: Tracheophytes
- Clade: Angiosperms
- Clade: Eudicots
- Clade: Asterids
- Order: Lamiales
- Family: Lamiaceae
- Genus: Vitex
- Species: V. quinata

Binomial name
- Vitex quinata (Lour.) F.N.Williams

Synonyms
- Cornutia quinata Lour.; Vitex loureiroi Hook. & Arn.; Vitex altmannii Moldenke; Vitex babula Buch.-Ham. ex Wall.; Vitex celebica Koord.; Vitex heterophylla Roxb.; Vitex heterophylla var. undulata C.B.Clarke; Vitex loureiroi Wight ex C.B.Clarke; Vitex padangensis Hallier f.; Vitex quinata f. lungchowensis S.L.Liou; Vitex secundiflora var. longipes Moldenke; Vitex sumatrana Miq.; Vitex sumatrana var. urceolata (C.B.Clarke) King & Gamble; Vitex undulata Wall.; Vitex urceolata C.B.Clarke

= Vitex quinata =

Species of flowering plant

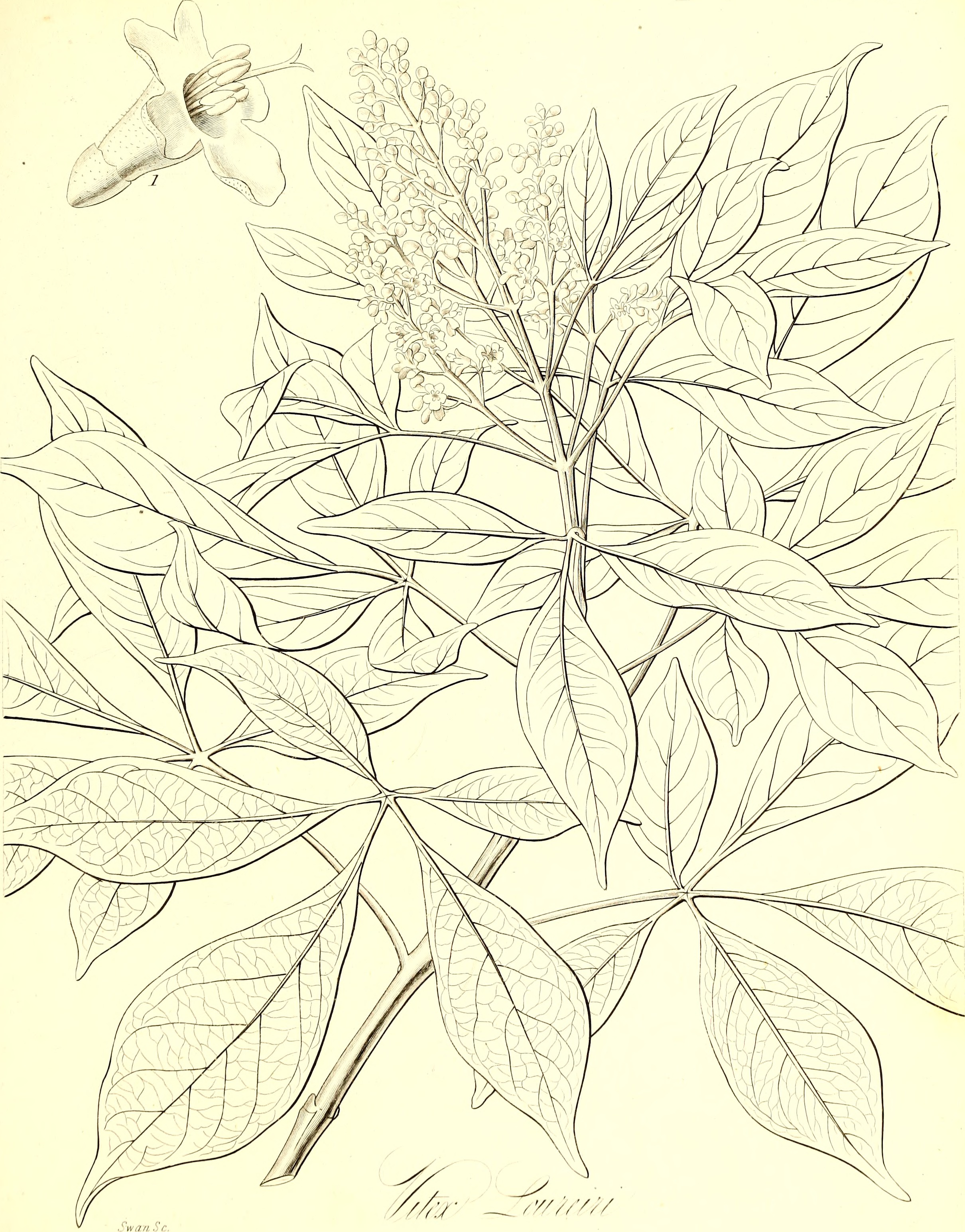

Vitex quinata is a species of flowering plantin the family Lamiaceae. It is sometimes referred to by the common name joho lawe tree. It is native to the Andaman Islands, Assam (India), Bangladesh, the Bismarck Archipelago, Borneo, Cambodia, the Caroline Islands, South-Central China, Southeast China, the East Himalayas, Hainan (China), India, Java (Indonesia), Laos, the Lesser Sunda Islands (Indonesia), Malaysia, Maluku (Indonesia), Myanmar, Nansei-shoto, New Guinea, Pakistan, Philippines, Sulawesi (Indonesia), Sumatra (Indonesia), Taiwan, Thailand, and Vietnam.

== Uses ==
Some sources claim the bark is used as a tonic in folk medicine where an infusion can be made to increase appetite.
