= Wilfrid Percy Henry Sheldon =

Sir Wilfrid Percy Henry Sheldon (1901-1983) was an English consulting physician. He wrote one of the first major textbooks of paediatric medicine and was physician-paediatrician to the household of Queen Elizabeth II for nearly 20 years. Together with researchers in Holland, Sheldon was responsible for the discovery that coeliac disease is related to wheat products in the diet.

== Education and career ==
Wilfrid Percy Henry Sheldon was born on 23 November 1901 at Woodford, Essex. He attended Bancroft's School in Woodford, King's College, London, and King's College Hospital, London, graduating from the latter in 1923. In 1926, he was appointed consulting paediatrician at King's College Hospital and became consultant physician to the Hospital for Sick Children in Great Ormond Street several years later. He was one of the few full-time early practitioners of paediatric medicine in Britain during this era, when volunteer hospital consultants were not paid for their services.

During the Second World War, Sheldon organized hospitals for children evacuated from London. In 1947 he became director of the department of child health at King's College Hospital.

Sheldon was physician-paediatrician to the household of Queen Elizabeth II from 1952 to 1971, a period covering the childhoods of the royal siblings Charles, Anne, Andrew and Edward. He also maintained a private practice in Harley Street, London.

As an advisor in child health to the Department of Health (United Kingdom) from 1952 to 1961, Sheldon was closely involved in establishing paediatric medical programmes under the National Health Service.

Sheldon was made Commander of the Royal Victorian Order in 1954, and Knight Commander in 1959. During the later years of his life, he lived in the Coombe neighborhood of Kingston upon Thames.

== Publications ==
- Text Book of Diseases of Infancy and Childhood (1936)
- Dietary Starch and Fat Absorption (1949)
- List of medical journal articles authored by Wilfrid Sheldon, University College of London Institute of Child Health

== See also ==
- British Pathe newsreel: Queen Visits Great Ormond Street Hospital (1952). Princess Elizabeth (Queen Elizabeth II) and Dr. Wilfrid Sheldon.
