= Psychogeography (book) =

2007 book by Will Self

- Author: Will Self
- Illustrator: Ralph Steadman
- Cover artist: Ralph Steadman
- Language: English
- Publisher: Bloomsbury Publishing PLC
- Publication date: United Kingdom; 22 Oct 2007
- Publication place: United Kingdom
- Pages: 256pp
- ISBN: 0747590338

Psychogeography is a 2007 book written by Will Self and illustrated by Ralph Steadman.

== Content ==
The book is centred on a collection of some of the articles written in a regular column by Self for the Independent newspaper.

It explores the experiences of walking and the psychological states and thoughts that are generated as a result across a wide geographical canvas. It begins with a discussion of a walk from London to New York (particularly refracted through the lens of 9/11). Overall the book takes in places as disparate as the Scottish Highlands, Istanbul, Morocco, Liverpool, Chicago, Siena, Australia, India, Brazil, Thailand and Ohio. According to some critics, it is particularly within the context of London that Self produces his most penetrating writing and ideas.

The title of the work refers to the tradition of psychogeography dating back to the Situationist International. Self's concept differs from its original form in a number of ways, however. His walking is not generally purposeless since he often has pre-arranged events to attend such as book signings whilst he is also drawn to particular tourist monuments (in addition to what he describes as the 'Empty Quarters' that are off the beaten track).

Part of the motivation for these journeys is to operate in a way that contrasts with the speed and pace of globalised travel; in this sense Self sees his mission, in part, as being an "insurgent against the contemporary world."
