= Deborah Orr =

British journalist (1962–2019)

- Born: Deborah Jane Orr; 23 September 1962; Motherwell, Scotland
- Died: 19 October 2019 (aged 57)
- Education: University of St Andrews (BA)
- Occupation: Journalist
- Years active: 1980s–2018
- Spouse: Will Self (m. 1997; div. 2018)
- Children: 2

Deborah Jane Orr (23 September 1962 – 19 October 2019) was a British journalist who worked for The Guardian, The Independent and other publications.

== Early life and education ==
Orr was born on 23 September 1962 to Winifred "Win" and John Orr, a factory worker. She was raised in Motherwell, Scotland. She had one brother. She attended Garrion Academy, Wishaw (which later merged with Wishaw High School to form Clyde Valley High School) and the University of St Andrews, from which she graduated with a degree in English in 1983.

== Career ==
Orr worked as deputy editor for City Limits magazine, a workers' cooperative. Orr said later that they had "had no idea how to promote co-operative working". Until 1990, Orr was a contributor to New Statesman. In 1990, she began writing for The Guardian regularly. From 1993 to 1998, Orr was editor of the Guardian Weekend magazine. From 1998 until her death, Orr worked as a freelance journalist. She was also a columnist for The Independent.

In January 2018, her column for The Guardian ended when the newspaper relaunched in tabloid format. In February 2018, she joined the i newspaper as a regular columnist. In January 2020, Orr's memoir, Motherwell: A Girlhood, was published by Weidenfeld & Nicolson and serialised on BBC Radio 4.

== Views ==
Orr wrote, in 2017, "Homeless people are stuck in the streets once again. The services of food banks have never been more in demand. People with mental and physical illnesses or disabilities are dying for want of care, or even heat. The National Health Service has been plunged into a financial and staffing crisis, yet still has to soothe the dented ego of Richard Branson by making a payout to Virgin Care. The teaching profession is struggling once more with a rejigged exam system, and is bracing itself for a further squeeze on budgets. Our prison service is a series of riots waiting to happen."

On 19 October 2011, an article by Orr stated that the trade for Israeli soldier Gilad Shalit in exchange for over 1,000 Palestinian prisoners "tacitly acknowledges what so many Zionists believe: that the lives of the chosen are of hugely greater consequence than those of their unfortunate neighbours." This statement, viewed by many as antisemitic, was the subject of criticism. Orr apologised for words which she described as "badly chosen and poorly used". Her apology, too, was the subject of criticism.

== Personal life ==
In 1997, Orr married English author Will Self. They had two sons and lived in Stockwell; they separated in 2017 and divorced in 2018.

In 2010, she discovered she had breast cancer and was treated for it, which included a mastectomy. In 2017, Orr wrote about her struggles with complex post-traumatic stress disorder.

She died of breast cancer in October 2019, aged 57.

== Selected works and publications ==
=== Monographs ===
- Orr, Deborah (2020). Motherwell: A Girlhood. Weidenfeld & Nicolson. ISBN 978-1-474-61145-9. OCLC 1044867732. – January 2020

=== Plays ===
- Orr, Deborah (co-creator) (2012). Enquirer.
