= Junk Mail (book) =

1995 book by Will Self

- Author: Will Self
- Publisher: Bloomsbury Publishing
- Publication date: 1995
- ISBN: 1408838508

Junk Mail is a 1995 book by Will Self published by Bloomsbury Publishing. It features pieces of writing centred on drugs and the counter-culture, taken from writing in British newspapers such as The Guardian, The Observer and The Independent. It incorporates a wide range of writing, such as an article on drug dealers in the East End of London called "New Crack City", reflections on the nature of slacking, travel essays on whirling dervishes in Turkey as well as life in Israel and Ulster, and a script of sorts for a rock video by the group Massive Attack. It also includes dialogues with Martin Amis, J. G. Ballard and William Burroughs and profiles on Thomas Szasz, Damien Hirst, Tim Willocks and Bret Easton Ellis.
