= How the Dead Live =

2000 novel by Will Self

- First edition
- Author: Will Self
- Language: English
- Publisher: Bloomsbury
- Publication date: 19 June 2000
- Publication place: United Kingdom
- Media type: Print Paperback
- Pages: 416 pp
- ISBN: 0-7475-4895-1

How the Dead Live is a novel by Will Self. It was originally published by Bloomsbury in 2000.

== Plot ==
The story follows Lily Bloom's encounter with the afterlife after dying from cancer. After being transported to new lodgings near Dalston, accompanied by her Aboriginal spirit guide Phar Lap Jones, her dead 9-year-old son Rude Boy, and a lithopedion foetus, she soon starts to adapt and learn the ways of the dead.

== Reviews ==
"Self is a manic, inventive stylist who can't leave anything out: literary allusions from Goodnight Moon to Finnegans Wake; discussions of Australian sympathetic magic; a sub-theme about Lily's dentures (dentures also made a cameo appearance in "The North London Book of the Dead"). What with Martin Amis and Zadie Smith, this has certainly been a vintage literary year for teeth, and maybe Self has bitten off more plot than he can chew. Nonetheless, what How the Dead Live lacks in economy of structure it repays in lavishness of feeling and characterisation. Lily is a colossal heroine, a nighttown Molly Bloom who memorably reveals herself through her furious monologue. What begins as a satiric novel of ideas ends as a surprisingly moving elegy"

"Self has always given the impression of a man who intends to elope with his thesaurus at the first available opportunity; on the evidence of How the Dead Live, that opportunity has finally presented itself. We get pointless reiterations (unbeatable gloating, unbelievable schadenfreude); we get the word puling twice in eight pages, which, for a book that invokes Joyce, will not do; and we get wave after wave of viscous imagery (congealed reality . . . blubbery blancmange of an evidence). Throw this book at a wall and it will stick."

"Self's writing is, in other words, a handy illustration of the close link between cynic and sentimentalist. The person who looks at the world and sees nothing but pustulation is no better or worse—philosophically speaking—than the person who looks at the world and sees nothing but puppy dogs. As guides to the world they are equally reliable, which is to say not reliable at all. Self is writing literature, of course, not philosophy, and anyone using his work as a map deserves our every sympathy."
