= Peter Self =

English journalist, academic and planning policy-maker (1919-1999)

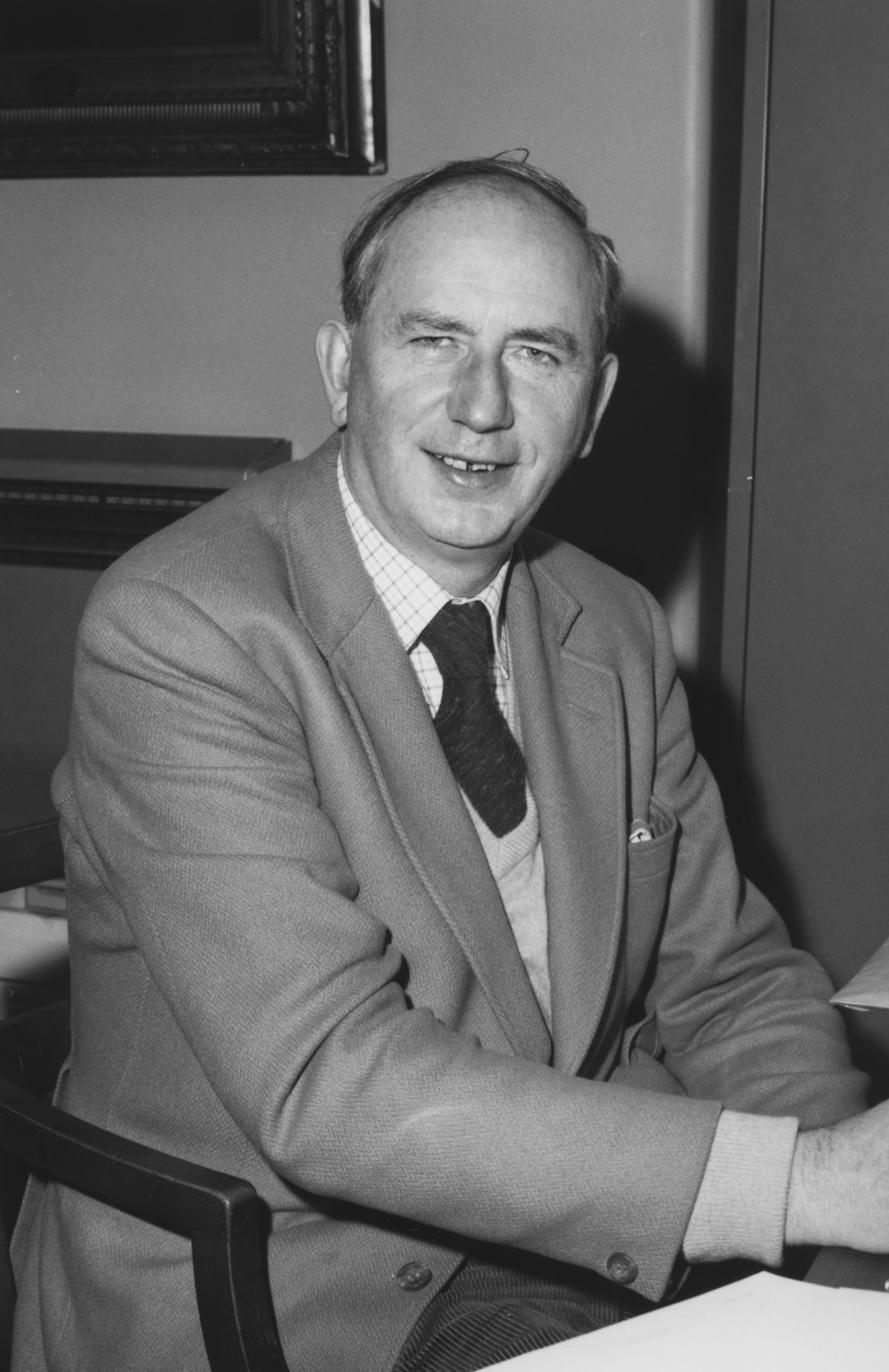
- Born: 7 June 1919; Brighton, England
- Died: 29 March 1999 (aged 79); Canberra, Australia
- Occupations: Professor of Public Administration; Journalist
- Spouses: Diana Mary Blizard Pitt (m. 1950; div. 1957) Elaine Adams (m. 1959; div. 1981)
- Children: Will Self; Jonathan Self

Academic background
- Education: Lancing College; Balliol College, Oxford (BA)

Academic work
- Discipline: Town planning
- Notable works: Planning the Urban Region (1982)

Peter John Otter Self (7 June 1919 – 29 March 1999) was an English journalist, academic, planning policy-maker and university teacher of planning.

== Early life ==
Self was born in Brighton, to Audrey (Otter) and Henry Self, a civil servant. Self was educated at Lancing College and Balliol College, Oxford, where he read Philosophy, Politics and Economics. In the Second World War, he was a conscientious objector, working on a farm. In his academic career, he became Professor of Public Administration at the London School of Economics, where he was a prominent member and leader of its Greater London Group research centre. He was also a prominent member of the Town and Country Planning Association. He then became Professor of Urban Research at the Australian National University.

== Personal life ==
He was the father of Jonathan Self and Will Self.

== Death ==
He died in Canberra on 29 March 1999.

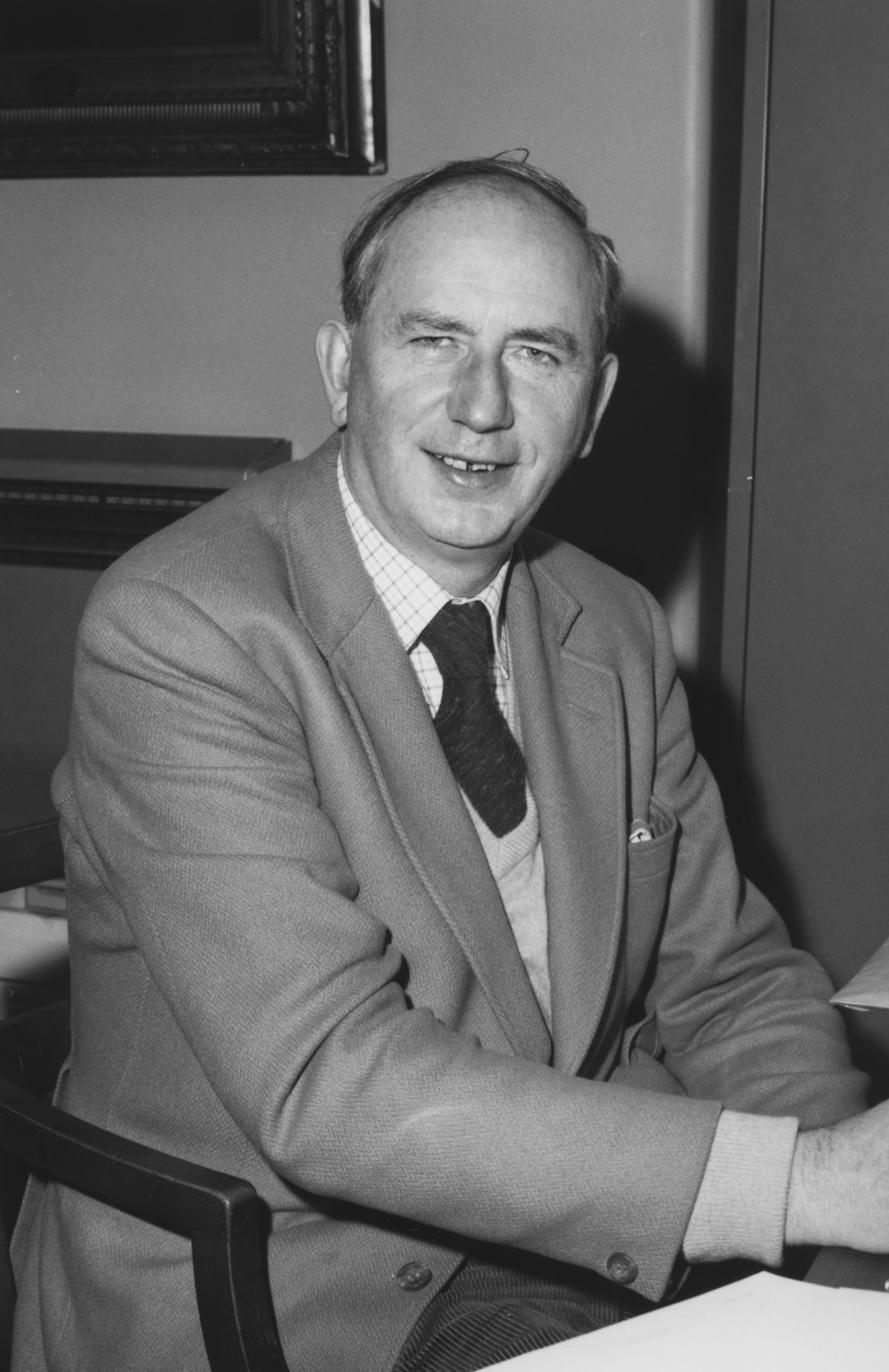
Peter Self, c. 1960

== Bibliography ==
- Regionalism, 1949
- Whither Local Government?, 1950
- Cities in Flood: The Problems of Urban Growth, 1960
- The State and the Farmer, 1962 ISBN 0043380328
- Metropolitan Planning: Planning System of Greater London, 1971 ISBN 0817300902
- Planning the Urban Region: A Comparative Study of Policies and Organizations, 1982 ISBN 0043520995
- New Towns: The British Experience, 1972
- Administrative Theories and Politics: An Enquiry into the Structure and Processes of Modern Government, 1972 ISBN 0043510434
- Econocrats and the Policy Process: Politics and Philosophy of Cost-benefit Analysis, 1976 ISBN 0333180968
- Administrative Theories and Politics: An Enquiry into the Structure and Processes of Modern Government, 1977 ISBN 0043510531
- Political Theories of Modern Government - Its role and reform, Unwin Hyman, London, 1985 ISBN 0-04-320174-1
- Government by the Market? The Politics of Public Choice, 1993 ISBN 0333569725
- Rolling Back the Market, 1999 ISBN 0312226519
