= Sara Campbell =

British free diver and former world record holder

Sara Campbell is a British freediver.

She is the former world record holder in free immersion (FIM) (diving to a depth of 81 m), constant weight (CWT) (96 m) and constant without fins (56 m). She is the "freediving face" of The Underwater Channel.

Campbell was born in Banbury, Oxfordshire to Barbara and Rob Campbell. She was educated at Bancroft's School from 1983 to 1990 and studied German and Italian at Bristol University. Campbell was working in public relations in London, and combining this with part-time aerobics instructing, when she decided to move to Dahab in 2005 and set up a yoga holiday business. Campbell stumbled upon freediving when one of her yoga students noticed she was very good at holding her breath.

On 2 April 2009, Sara Campbell set a new women's freediving world record in the Bahamas by diving to 96 m in constant weight.

As of 2018, Sara lives in Dahab, Egypt, a place noteworthy for freediving. She teaches freediving and Kundalini yoga in the South Sinai town.
