= William Hildred =

British civil servant

William Hildred, photographed by Bassano in 1938.

Sir William Percival Hildred, CB, OBE (13 July 1893 – 21 November 1986) was a British civil servant who served as Director-General of Civil Aviation between 1941 and 1946 and Director-General of the International Air Traffic Association between 1946 and 1966.

== Early life and family ==
Hildred was born on 13 July 1893 at Kingston-upon-Hull, the son of William Kirk Hildred (died 1957). In 1920, he married Constance Mary Chappell (died 1985) and with her had two sons and one daughter.

== Career ==
After studying at the Boulevard School, Hildred went to the University of Sheffield to study economics. In 1914, he joined the First Battalion of the York and Lancaster Regiment, serving in France and Salonika before he returned to England to recover from injuries in 1917. In 1918 or 1919, he took up a post in the civil service, initially entering the Treasury. He was Finance Officer for the Empire Marketing Board between 1926 and 1934, before being appointed Head of the Special Measures Branch at the Ministry of Agriculture (1934–35). After that, he was Deputy General Manager of the Export Credits Guarantee Department until 1938 and then Deputy Director-General of Civil Aviation in the Air Ministry. In 1940, he became a Principal Assistant Secretary in the Ministry of Aircraft Production and the following year he was appointed Director-General of Civil Aviation, in which post he served until 1946.

While at the Air Ministry, Hildred worked closely with the Brabazon Committee, which was drafting up plans for post-war British aircraft. In 1945, he was the British delegate to the Anglo-American Civil Aviation Conference, which precipitated the Bermuda Agreement. At Havana in 1945, representatives of various airlines decided to revive the International Air Traffic Association and they unanimously elected Hildred as their Director-General. Hildred would remain in the position until his retirement in 1966. The Times remarked that he "steered IATA with skill and determination along a course made turbulent by the often conflicting interests of what grew from 40 to 101 airlines of more than 50 nations ... he established himself as a skilfil negotiator, a sound administrator and an eloquent speaker".

On retirement, he and his wife lived at Frensham, Surrey, where he enjoyed cycling and carpentry. He had been appointed an Officer of the Order of the British Empire in 1936, a Companion of the Order of the Bath in 1942 and Knight Bachelor in 1945. He was also a Grand Officer of the Dutch Order of Orange-Nassau and a Commander of the Order of the Crown of Belgium. He died on 21 November 1986.

Government offices
Preceded by none	Director-General of the Ministry of Civil Aviation; 1941–1946	Succeeded by Sir Henry Self
