= Joe Layburn =

English children's author

Joe Layburn is an English children's author. He has written three books in all, in collaboration with illustrator John Williams and published by Frances Lincoln Children's Books. He won the 2011 Tower Hamlets Children's Book Award for his second novel Street Heroes, which was also nominated for the 2011 Southwark Book Award. He currently works as Headmaster of Bancroft's Preparatory School in Essex.

== Bibliography ==
Ghostscape (2008)

Street Heroes (2010)

Runaways (Street Heroes) (2011)
