= Frederic Newton Williams =

British physician and botanist (1862–1923)

Frederic Newton Williams (19 March 1862, Brentford, West London – 6 May 1923, Isleworth, West London) was an English physician and botanist.

== Biography ==
His father practised medicine in Brentford. Frederic Newton Williams was educated at Edward Bancroft's Hospital in London and then at St. Thomas' Hospital, where he became interested in botany. After qualifying with the degrees L.R.C.P. and L.S.A., he succeeded to his father's medical practice. Although Frederic Newton Williams continued to practise medicine, he was more interested in botany and the progress of the medicine and surgery. He frequently attended medical congresses abroad. He was elected in 1884 a fellow of the Linnean Society of London, in which he was an active participant.

His first botanical paper was written in Latin, a language which he wrote with fluency. He contributed many papers to the Journal of Botany, British and Foreign. He published some papers in French and Italian and also corresponded by letter in those languages with French and Italian botanists. He also had a good knowledge of German.

According to T. R. R. Stebbing, Williams visited Naples in the second decade of the 20th century and encountered a fraud involving the supposedly miraculous liquefaction of the blood of Saint Januarius and a pharmacist's preparation of a mixture of ox-bile and crystals of Glauber's salt.

Dianthus mooiensis, Gypsophila cephalotes, Pavetta corymbosa, and Vitex quinata are among the plant names credited to Williams.

== Selected publications ==
- Williams, Frederic Newton (1890). The Pinks of Central Europe.
- ——— (1895). On the Genus Arenaria, Linn.
- ——— (1893). A Monograph of the Genus Dianthus, Linn.
- ——— (1896). Revision of the Genus Silene, Linn.
- ——— (1911). Prodromus Floræ Britannicæ, Parts 1-8.
