= Umbrella (novel) =

2012 novel by Will Self

- Author: Will Self
- Language: English
- Publisher: Bloomsbury Publishing PLC
- Publication date: United Kingdom; 16 August 2012; United States; 8 January 2013
- Publication place: United Kingdom
- Pages: 416pp
- ISBN: 1408820145

Umbrella is the ninth novel by Will Self, published in 2012.

It was shortlisted for the Man Booker Prize for Fiction in 2012, Will Self's first shortlist nomination, although his 2002 novel Dorian, an Imitation was longlisted for the prize.

== Content ==
The stream-of-consciousness novel tells the story of a psychiatrist Zack Busner and his treatment of a patient at Friern Hospital in 1971 who has encephalitis lethargica and has been in a vegetative state since 1918, when she was a munitions worker. The patient, Audrey Death, has two brothers whose activities before and during the First World War are interwoven into her own story. Busner brings her back to consciousness using a new drug (L-Dopa, which was used for the same purpose by Oliver Sacks in the 1970s). In the final element of the story, in 2010 the asylum is no longer in existence and the recently retired Busner travels across north London trying to find the truth about his experience with his patient.

The novel is written in a flowing fashion without chapters and very few paragraph breaks between scenes. It intercuts between different time periods and is composed of interlaced narratives. In some senses its structuring can be likened to free jazz.

Self has indicated that the book would be the first part of a trilogy, against his own initial expectations. The second part of the trilogy is Shark published in 2014.

== Reviews ==
In The Daily Telegraph, Sheena Joughlin wrote:

Every experience is filtered through another, or infiltrated by it. At times, this Self-imposed exile from any “fixed regard”, threatens the narrative’s sanity, and its readability, but that is the point. Whether Umbrella takes experimental fiction beyond the magnificent cul-de-sac into which Joyce steered it is doubtful. But this fresh reminder of the potential of finding new selves – to be and to write with – is extraordinary.

Sam Leith, writing for The Observer, said:

The antic gurgles of laughter you find in Self's earlier work are few and far between. In their place, though, is a sustained depth and seriousness, and an ambition of technique that I haven't seen in him before. I don't mean to put you off. Umbrella is old-school modernism. It isn't supposed to be a breeze. But it is, to use the literary critical term of art, kind of amazing. To frame it in terms of the film Gremlins, if you fed Alan Hollinghurst's The Stranger's Child after midnight, it might come out looking a bit like Umbrella
