= The Quantity Theory of Insanity =

1991 short story collection by Will Self

- First edition
- Author: Will Self
- Language: English
- Genre: Short Story Collection
- Publisher: Bloomsbury Publishing
- Publication date: Nov 1991
- Publication place: United Kingdom
- Media type: Print (paperback)
- Pages: 288 pp
- ISBN: 978-0-7475-1013-0
- OCLC: 62891876

The Quantity Theory of Insanity is a collection of short stories by Will Self. It won the Geoffrey Faber Memorial Prize in 1993.

== Publishing details ==
First published in 1991 in paperback it was the first published collection of the author's short work and includes themes and characters (such as Zack Busner) that are common throughout Self's shorter and longer fiction.

Self received an advance of £1,700 for the work.

Within this collection, as well as Dr Busner appearing in two of the stories, the fictional tribe the "Ur-Bororo" are a touchstone. Specifically in the story "Understanding the Ur-Bororo" and subtly in "Ward 9" and the title story. The book is prefaced by the traditional Ur-Bororo saying "However far you may travel in this world, you will still occupy the same volume of space."

Praise for the collection came from fellow authors and critics.

"If a manic J. G. Ballard and a depressive David Lodge got together, they might produce something like The Quantity Theory of Insanity. But Will Self's world is all his own" - Martin Amis

"'Will Self's The Quantity Theory of Insanity is as disturbing as satire ought to be and these days seldom is. Also it is unashamedly funny as well as chilling, presented with an air of cunning repose" - The Guardian

== Stories ==
"The North London Book of the Dead"

A young man's mother dies. After her funeral he begins to see her acting as normal. At first he wonders if this is an effect of his grief addled mind, until he approaches and talks to one of the apparitions.

"Ward 9"

A new art therapist begins treating the psychological patients on the eponymous Ward 9. As the story progresses the therapist becomes more embroiled in the lives of the patients, begins taking medication one of them gives him and investigates the machine in the basement of the hospital. The ward is overseen by Zack Busner, a position he also holds during the story "Dr Mukti" in another of Self's collections.

"Understanding the Ur-Bororo"

A man wonders what happened to his friend Janner from the days when they were at school in Reigate together. His friend had tended towards secrecy and reclusiveness at the time, before disappearing completely. Then he bumps into him in a laundrette. Over dinner he explains where he has been and who he has been studying.

"The Quantity Theory of Insanity"

The title story deals with the creation, testing and impact of the "Quantity Theory of Insanity." A Number of scientists are involved including Zack Busner. The Doctors use a group of patients in a concept house in Willesden Junction.

"Mono Cellular"

A man suffers from insomnia. Waiting to sleep he compiles a list of things keeping him awake and muses upon his recent life and where it is going- however it is clear that he is afflicted by a certain level of 'insanity', as his musings become more and more erratic and irrelevant.

"Waiting"

A man watches his friend James descend into madness exacerbated by a cult-like group led by a motorcycle courier named Carlos. James is obsessed with waiting, and goes to great lengths to avoid it. He contends that all people are constantly waiting and rails against it passionately.
