= Grey Area (short story collection) =

1994 collection of short stories by Will Self

- First edition
- Author: Will Self
- Language: English
- Publisher: Bloomsbury Publishing
- Publication date: 25 January 1994
- Publication place: United Kingdom
- Media type: Print (hardback & paperback)
- Pages: 304 pp
- ISBN: 978-0-14-024711-4
- OCLC: 34354906

Grey Area is the second collection of short stories by the author Will Self.

== Publishing Details ==
The collection was first published in 1994. It comprises some of Self's commissioned work as well as a number of stories written specially for the anthology. As with Self's other collections the stories deal with post modern ideas and situations with Zack Busner reappearing in a number of the stories.

Unlike Self's other short fiction there is very little in the way of connection between the stories, certainly not from a plot and character point of view. In an interview with the Boston Phoenix Self said "I wasn't altogether happy with Grey Area. I think it would have been a better book if I'd made all the stories link."

Each story in the book is titled with a small picture to illustrate a facet of the story. The book is dedicated to the author's brothers and is prefaced by the epitaph of Dr Zack Busner which reads, "He had no interests but interest."

== Stories ==
Between the Conceits
The story's narrator describes how he and seven other individuals manipulate the population of London. He describes the politics that go on between the manipulators (Lady Bob, Lechmere, Dooley, the Bollam Sisters The Recorder, Colin Purves) and their charge's orchestrated interactions.

The Indian Mutiny
A group of students rebel against their schoolmaster, Mr Vello, after he attempts to keep order by creating an Indian Army in the classroom.

This story was commissioned by Tony Peake for the Constable anthology "Winter's Tales."

A Short History of the English Novel
Two friends, Gerard and Geraldine, wander across London taking in lunch and coffee and discussing English literature. Much to Gerard's chagrin they encounter an alarming number of authors.

This story was commissioned by Maria Lexton for the "Time Out Book of London Short Stories" and was also subsequently published in Time Out.

Incubus
A young research assistant comes to stay with a professor and his family to work with the professor on his book. Housed in curious quarters, called The Rood Room, she begins to feel the effect of the pagan imagery described on the walls and ceiling.

This story was commissioned by Tony Peake for a "Seduction" anthology for Serpent's Tail.

Scale
A man living alone describes his complete loss of scale (as others would lose a sense of proportion) as well as his recent history, his work as a writer and his process of obtaining a sustained source of opium.

An Abridged version of this story appeared in Granta, although was originally commissioned by Martin Jaques. The author can be heard narrating passages of this story on the track "5ml Barrel" by Bomb the Bass.

Chest
A short hop into the future and the air has become so polluted that it is toxic to breathe. Nebulisers, inhalers and even linctus have become the most desirable and useful items to own.

Grey Area
An office worker, working in The department, starts to notice that things are not quite as they should be. Or more accurately are exactly and repetitively as they seem. The story ends with an episode of Newsnight and a discussion between Peter Snow, Zack Busner and Professor Stein.

Inclusion
A story told in epistolary fashion. The three documents involved are an information pack for the antidepressant drug Inclusion, the diary entries of Simon Dykes and the diary entries of Zack Busner.

The End of the Relationship
A woman leaves her boyfriend and spends the rest of the day bouncing from person to person, meeting rejection at every corner.
