= Alan Palmer =

British writer on history and biography (1926–2022)

Alan Warwick Palmer (28 September 1926 – 25 March 2022) was a British author of popular historical and biographical books. A number of these books were translated into other languages.

== Background ==
Palmer was educated at Bancroft's School, Woodford Green, London, and Oriel College, Oxford. He spent 19 years as senior history teacher at Highgate School before becoming a full-time writer and researcher. His late wife, Veronica Palmer collaborated on several of his books.

The historian Martin Gilbert was a pupil of Palmer's at Highgate, and contributed a foreword to a 2003 reprinting of his book Napoleon in Russia stating: "Alan Palmer is one of my favourite historians. I have read all his thirty plus books, and have learned from them all. His reference works serve as models of clarity and presentation... how lucky we schoolboys were to have a working historian as our teaching historian".

== Death ==
Palmer died on 25 March 2022, at the age of 95.

== Honours and awards ==
He was elected a Fellow of the Royal Society of Literature in 1980.

== Bibliography ==
=== Biographies ===
- The Life and Times of George IV (1972). Weidenfeld & Nicolson "Kings and Queens" series.
- Metternich: Councillor of Europe (1972; reprinted 1997).
  - (in German) Metternich. Der Staatsmann Europas (1977; 1986). ISBN 978-3-546-47346-0.
- Alexander I: Tsar of War and Peace (1974).
  - (in German) Alexander I. Gegenspieler Napoleons (1984). ISBN 978-3-453-55114-5.
  - (in German) Alexander I. Der rätselhafte Zar, Ullstein, Berlin (1994). ISBN 3-548-35402-5.
- Frederick The Great (1974). Weidenfeld & Nicolson "Great Lives" series.
- Bismarck (1976).
  - (in German) Bismarck. Eine Biographie (1976).
- Kings and Queens of England (1976; reprinted 1985).
- The Kaiser: Warlord of the Second Reich (1978). ISBN 978-0-297-77393-1.
- Princes of Wales (1979).
- Bernadotte: Napoleon's Marshal, Sweden's King (1990).
  - (in Swedish) Bernadotte. Napoleons marskalk, Sveriges kung (1992).
- Kemal Atatürk (1991). "Makers of the 20th Century" series.
- Twilight of the Habsburgs: The Life and Times of Emperor Francis Joseph (1994; reprinted 1997). ISBN 978-0-87113-665-7.
  - (in German) Franz Joseph I. Kaiser von Österreich und König von Ungarn (1995)
- Napoleon & Marie Louise: The Emperor's Second Wife (2001).

=== History ===
- The Gardeners of Salonika: The Macedonian Campaign 1915-1918 (1965).
- Napoleon in Russia: The 1812 Campaign (1967; reprinted 1997). also reprinted as: A Brief History of Napoleon in Russia (2003).
  - (in German) Napoleon in Russland (1969).
- Russia in War and Peace (1972). ISBN 0-297-99565-0.
- Nations and Empires (1974). editor, "Milestones of History" series.
- Age of Optimism (1974). editor, "Milestones of History" series.
- Royal England: A Gazetteer (1983). with Veronica Palmer.
- The Chancelleries of Europe: Hidden Diplomacy, 1814-1918 (1983).
- Crowned Cousins: The Anglo-German Royal Connection (1985).
- Banner of Battle: Story of the Crimean War (1987). ISBN 978-0-297-79042-6.
- The East End: Four Centuries of London Life (1989; reprinted 2000, 2004) ISBN 978-0-7195-4676-1.
- The Royal House of Greece (1990).
- The Decline and Fall of the Ottoman Empire (1992). ISBN 978-0-71954-934-2.
  - (in German) Verfall und Untergang des Osmanischen Reiches (1997). ISBN 978-3-453-11768-6.
- Victory 1918 (1998).
- Northern Shores: A History of the Baltic Sea and Its Peoples (2005). ISBN 978-0-7195-6287-7.
  - US edition: The Baltic: A New History of the Region and Its People (2006). ISBN 978-0-7195-6299-0.
- The Salient: Ypres, 1914-18 (2007). ISBN 978-1-84119-633-6.

=== Reference works ===
- A Dictionary of Modern History, 1789–1945 (1962; reprinted 1964, 1972, 1984). also reprinted as: The Penguin Dictionary of Modern History.
- A Military Atlas of the First World War (1975). ISBN 0-3128-7096-5. with Arthur Banks.
- Quotations in History: A Dictionary of Historical Quotations c.800 to the present (1976; reprinted 1985). with Veronica Palmer.
- The Facts on File Dictionary of 20th Century History (1979; reprinted).
- Who's Who in Modern History (1980; reprinted).
- Who's Who in Shakespeare's England (1981). ISBN 0-3128-7096-5. with Veronica Palmer.
- The Penguin Dictionary of Twentieth Century History (2nd ed., 1983). ISBN 0-1405-1131-8.
- An Encyclopaedia of Napoleon's Europe (1984; reprinted 1998). ISBN 978-0094787001.
- Who's Who in Bloomsbury (1987). with Veronica Palmer.
- A Dictionary of Modern Politics (1993?).
- The Chronology of British History: from 250,000 BC to the present day (1995). with Veronica Palmer.
- Dictionary of the British Empire and Commonwealth (1996).
- Who's Who in World Politics (1996). Routledge "Who's Who" series.
