= The Butt =

2008 novel by Will Self

- The Book's Cover
- Author: Will Self
- Language: English
- Genre: Novel
- Publisher: Bloomsbury Publishing
- Publication date: Hardback; 7 April 2008; Paperback; 4 May 2009
- Publication place: United Kingdom
- Pages: 355 pp
- ISBN: 978-0-7475-9175-7
- OCLC: 192045616
- Dewey Decimal: 823/.914 22
- LC Class: PR6069.E3654 B88 2008

The Butt is a 2008 satirical novel by Will Self.

== Content ==
The story revolves around Tom, a tourist (presumed to be American, although that is never made clear) visiting an unnamed country that seems to be a mix of Africa, Middle East, Caribbean and Australia. He becomes embroiled in a legal minefield when flicking a cigarette butt, his last before quitting, off his holiday apartment balcony. The resulting arc causes the butt to burn and injure an elderly man. His ensuing journey to make suitable reparations takes him across the entire country with its different territories and rules. His company on this trip comes in the form of Brian Prentice, another tourist (presumably British) who is concerned more with the cricket match in the capital than the dangerous trip, and whom Tom suspects is a paedophile.

== Reviews ==
Writing for The Daily Telegraph, Jane Shilling wrote...

Self writes here with an adroit impersonation of coarse exuberance that makes The Butt as readable as a blokeish airport novel (though with a fuddlingly large vocabulary). But just beneath the brash surface shimmer the unmistakable apparitions of Self’s masters: Swift, Voltaire and Lewis Carroll are all partly responsible for the ingenious, mephitic invention that is The Butt.

Michael Bywater, writing for The Independent wrote...

Hard to enumerate what Self has sodded up here, right? Australia. Aboriginal councils. Sharia law. Live Aid. Western "respect" for other "folkways". The whole damn planet. And all the things Self's Australia isn't, or might be: Africa, the Middle East, Papua New Guinea. He's wrapped it up and crushed it out of shape, and the absurd ending exists really to be unnecessary. Things have gone far enough, anyway. The Butt is a hideously engaged, overwritten, barking masterpiece. You're going to read it, that's for sure, but don't say I didn't warn you.
