= The Unbearable Lightness of Being a Prawn Cracker =

2012 book by Will Self

- Author: Will Self
- Language: English
- Series: Penguin Specials
- Genre: Non-fiction
- Publisher: Penguin
- Publication date: 1 February 2012
- Publication place: United Kingdom
- Pages: 50 pp.
- ISBN: 9780241962619

The Unbearable Lightness of Being a Prawn Cracker is a collection of Will Self's Real Meals column for the New Statesman. Covering such things as London Cheesecake, Pizza Express, ready meals and fast food cuisine. The title is a play on Milan Kundera's The Unbearable Lightness of Being.

== Content ==
The collection of columns covers a variety of non-traditional culinary experiences to provide a counterpoint to the more idealistic style of food reviewing. Self's stated aim for the column was as follows:

Most food writing and restaurant criticism is concerned with the ideal, with how by cooking this, or dining there, you can somehow ingurgitate a new—or at any rate improved—social, aesthetic and even spiritual persona. I aimed to turn this proposition on its head, and instead of commenting on where and what people would ideally like to eat I would consider where and what they actually did: the ready meals, buffet snacks and—most importantly—fast food that millions of Britons chomp upon in the go-round of their often hurried and dyspeptic lives.

== Reviews ==
Benedicte Page writing for The Guardian observed, "...it sees Self take an entertaining trip around the less celebrated of our eateries while dissecting his own fast-food addictions."
