= Mark Pelling =

His Honour Judge Pelling KC (born 27 June 1956) is a British judge, currently in charge of the London Circuit Commercial Court.

He was educated at Bancroft's School and King's College London (LLB; AKC). He was called to the bar at Middle Temple in 1979, became a Queen's Counsel in 2003 and served as a Recorder from 2004 to 2006. He was made a bencher of Middle Temple in 2011.
