= Shark (novel) =

2014 novel by Will Self

- First edition (UK)
- Author: Will Self
- Language: English
- Publisher: Viking Press (UK); Grove Press (US)
- Publication date: United Kingdom - September 4
- Publication place: United Kingdom
- Pages: 480pp
- ISBN: 978-0-670-91857-7
- Preceded by: Umbrella
- Followed by: Phone

Shark is the tenth novel by Will Self, published in 2014.

== Content ==
The stream-of-consciousness novel continues the story of psychiatrist Zack Busner.

The novel is written in a flowing fashion without chapters and with no paragraph breaks. It is "a book-length paragraph, beginning and ending mid-sentence", which hops "between characters and time periods with the agility of a mountain goat."

Self indicated that Umbrella was the first part of a trilogy against his own initial expectations. The final part of the trilogy is Phone.

== Reviews ==
Writing for The Sunday Times, Theo Tait wrote...

"Overall, Shark generates a dream-like synthesis of rational and irrational, familiar and strange... it’s clear that, with this trilogy, Self is creating something rather grand."

Stuart Kelly, writing for The Guardian wrote...

"Shark" is angrier, more brutal and more intense: it made me furious, not melancholic. But the book itself is also a paean to books...."Shark" confirms that Self is the most daring and delightful novelist of his generation, a writer whose formidable intellect is mercilessly targeted on the limits of the cerebral as a means of understanding. Yes, he makes you think, but he also insists that you feel"

Writing for the New York Times, Mark Athitakis wrote...

"Shark often reads like a baggy mess. Yet it’s a mess that reflects a respectable urge to capture the mental and social collapse Self sees as a legacy of the world wars."

Writing for The Times, Melissa Katsoulis wrote...

"It’s bewildering, exhausting and so relentlessly out of focus that unless you are a disenfranchised English student hopped up on caffeine pills and a hatred of Thomas Hardy, you’re unlikely to make it through to the end, still less part with nearly £20 for it."
