= Walking to Hollywood =

2010 novel by Will Self

- Walking to Hollywood cover
- Author: Will Self
- Cover artist: Ralph Steadman
- Language: English
- Genre: Novel
- Publisher: Bloomsbury Publishing PLC
- Publication date: Hardback; September 2010
- Publication place: United Kingdom
- Pages: 448 pp
- ISBN: 978-0-7475-9844-2

Walking to Hollywood is a 2010 novel by writer and media personality Will Self. Self describes the novel as 'a cross between a comical farce and an intense misery memoir'. The novel is published by Bloomsbury in the U.K. and Grove Press in the U.S. It was mainly conceived whilst Self himself walked to Hollywood from Los Angeles Airport.

== Content ==
The sections of the book form a triptych. Each part of the book details a relation between the artist and his art, whether this be Sherman Oaks, a dwarf sculptor who makes gigantic statues, or Self's own voyage to discover the filmmakers responsible for tainting the form with CGI. The blurring between the factual elements of Self's life and opinions, Gonzo-esque embellishments, and the use of an unreliable narrator, makes a clear distinction between fact and falsity virtually impossible.

== Reviews ==
Reviews were generally positive. The Spectator commented in their review...

The conversations with Scooby-Doo, the made-up characters, the sex, lies and videotape – this is a landscape contoured, almost in whole, by Self’s imagination… It is, as always, a place crammed with a Devil’s Dictionary’s worth of wordplay, and with an unerring tendency towards the absurd.

Scotland on Sunday went further, commenting that Self had finally found his place as an author...

The most successful book he has written, and it establishes, perhaps, what kind of writer Self actually is: a modern-day Jonathan Swift. He has the satirist’s interest in exaggeration, distortion, snarling anger and linguistic verve, but more seriously, he is serious. There is a deeply moral core to Walking To Hollywood, and a raw emotional quality his previous fictions may have repressed or sublimated.
