= Norman Charles Suckling =

English biographer, composer, pianist, and writer on music

Norman Charles Suckling (24 October 1904 – August 1994) was an English biographer, composer, pianist, and writer on music. Born in the Forest Gate neighborhood of London, he studied at the Bancroft's School in Woodford Green, Essex in his youth. He then entered The Queen's College, Oxford where he earned a diploma in History. He taught at Liverpool College before joining the faculty of King's College, Newcastle (now Durham University) where he was a professor of the French language. He contributed articles to a number of periodicals and is the author of several books, including biographies on Gabriel Fauré and Molière.

While at Durham, Suckling sometimes performed as a pianist, presenting concerts of mostly French music. His Fauré monograph of 1946 was the first full length study to appear in English. He contributed articles on English, French and Russian music to The Listener and other publications. He composed many songs setting English poets. Other works include:

- Introduction and Scherzo for string quartet (1923)
- Ode for Violin and Piano (OUP, 1925)
- A Vision of Avalon (chamber opera, 1928)
- A Cycle of Shakespeare Sonnets for tenor, violin and piano (1928)
- Violin Sonata (1928)
- Man in the Beginning, ballet (1934)
- Berceuse élégiaque for clarinet and piano (1943)
- Pastorale saugrenue for flute and bassoon (1944)
- Variations on a Theme of Rameau for flute and piano (1947)
- Mass for eight voices
