= The Sweet Smell of Psychosis =

- First edition
- Author: Will Self
- Illustrator: Martin Rowson
- Language: English
- Publisher: Bloomsbury Publishing
- Publication date: 15 May 1997
- Publication place: United Kingdom
- Media type: Print (Paperback)
- Pages: 92 pp
- ISBN: 978-0-7475-3154-8
- OCLC: 59651939

The Sweet Smell of Psychosis is English writer Will Self's first published novella. It was printed by Bloomsbury Books in 1996 and features illustrations by Martin Rowson.

Richard Hermes is a London journalist who lives a life of drudging days and cocaine fuelled nights. He falls in with a local media personality called Bell and his crew which includes the delightful and attractive Ursula. Ursula is also a media type writing a good sex column. As Richard attempts to get closer and closer to her, he finds himself consuming more and more until finally psychosis begins to break in.

== Reception ==
In reviewing the book Katherine Guckenberger concludes:

"Self's message is clear: life is ugly and ironic, and the sooner one figures this out, the sooner one can not overcome it but accept it."

Brian Budzynski writing for the Center for Book Culture observed:

"Self’s satirical indictment of urban literary culture is defined within his prose by Richard’s voice, "brusque to the point of rank rudeness". With an air of contempt and "expensively studied disregard", Self’s characters endeavor to persevere within the "knots of desperation" that they have created. One can’t help but think that Self implicates himself as a fellow "hack"; his language perfectly reflects a subculture that is as mysterious as it is dangerous and intriguing."
