= Will (Will Self memoir) =

2019 memoir by Will Self

- First edition
- Author: Will Self
- Language: English
- Genre: Memoir
- Publisher: Viking Press
- Publication date: 2019
- Publication place: United Kingdom

Will is the memoir of British writer Will Self. It was first published in the United Kingdom in 2019. The book documents various stages of his life, starting at Self's childhood in a quiet North London suburb, through his education at Oxford and his eventual descent into drug addiction.
