= Arnold Overton =

English civil servant

Sir Arnold Edersheim Overton, KCB, KCMG, MC (8 January 1893 – 10 September 1975) was an English civil servant. The son of a Canon F. A. Overton, he was educated at New College, Oxford. During the First World War, he served in the Royal Engineers and was awarded the Military Cross in 1918. Leaving the Army, in 1919 he entered the Board of Trade and represented Britain at the Ottawa Conference and on the Anglo-American Trade Agreement. He was the Permanent Secretary of the Board of Trade from 1941 to 1945 and of the Ministry of Civil Aviation from 1947 to 1953. Between 1945 and 1947, he was Minister in Charge of the Middle East Office in Cairo. His son, Hugh, was a diplomat.

Government offices
Preceded by Sir Henry Self	Director-General of the Ministry of Civil Aviation; 1947–1953	Succeeded by Sir Gilmour Jenkins as Permanent Secretary, Ministry of Transport and Civil Aviation
