= The Book of Dave =

2006 novel by Will Self

- First edition
- Author: Will Self
- Language: English
- Genre: Science fiction
- Publisher: Viking Press
- Publication date: 1 June 2006
- Publication place: United Kingdom
- Media type: Print Paperback
- Pages: 495
- ISBN: 978-0-670-91443-2
- OCLC: 64313267

The Book of Dave is a 2006 novel by English author Will Self.

== Content ==
The Book of Dave tells the story of an angry and mentally ill London taxi driver named Dave Rudman, who writes and has printed on metal a book of his rantings against women and thoughts on custody rights for fathers. These stem from his anger with his ex-wife, Michelle, who he believes is unfairly keeping him from his son. Equally influential in Dave's book is The Knowledge—the intimate familiarity with the city of London required of its cabbies.

Dave buries the book, which is discovered centuries later and used as the sacred text for a dogmatic, cruel, and misogynistic religion that takes hold in the remnants of southern England and London following catastrophic flooding. The future portions of the novel are set from 523 AD (dating from the purported discovery of the book).

The book alternates between Dave's original experience and that of the future devotees of the religion inspired by his writings. Much of the dialogue in The Book of Dave is written in Mokni, an invented dialect of English derived from Cockney, taxi-drivers' and Dave's own usage, text-messaging, and vocabulary peculiar to the late 20th and early 21st centuries. For example, an unmarried woman is an "opare" (au pair); Dave calls Muslim women's concealing garments "cloakyfings"—his adherents use the word for women's outerwear in general. Spellings are phonetic and can be opaque, making the book particularly difficult for those unfamiliar with the speech of England and London: "bugsbunny" for rabbit is easy enough, but "beefansemis" for an architectural style is less clear—it presumably comes from "[Eliza]bethan semi[-detached house]s." A glossary is provided.

== Genesis and style ==
The book resembles, in part, Riddley Walker, a 1981 novel by Russell Hoban written in a similar phonetic manner and also set in England centuries after a major disaster. Self provided an introduction to the new 2002 edition of Hoban's book.

Writing in The Guardian in 2007, the author said he was inspired to write the book after having read The Bible Unearthed, a text that claims that archaeological discoveries imply that large elements of the Old Testament have no basis in historical reality whatsoever. He writes that he intended to suggest imaginatively the notion he received from Finkelstein and Silberman's book, namely that revealed religion is a necessary function of state formation, and that the content of this or that holy book is irrelevant, compared to what people make of it. At the same time, reports of increased raisings of the Thames Barrier had led him to contemplate that a catastrophic flood of London would render even detailed archival knowledge unable to reconstruct the metropolis.

The Book of Dave can be considered to be a parody of modern religion especially with regard to blind faith. For example, the "Hamsters", the inhabitants of the island of Ham (actually the higher, unflooded part of Hampstead Heath), believe that certain verses out of the book are sacred "hymns", where in fact they are just excerpts from The Knowledge. Additionally, aspects of Dave's life are ritualised into legal requirements: such as "changeover", the act of custodial exchange of children, and parents being forced to live apart even though they would be happy living together. "This challenges the assumption of whether people should follow something just because it is written in an old book." — Will Self

== Plot ==
=== Setting ===
The island in the novel is inspired by the hilltop town of Hampstead in London and its famous parkland Hampstead Heath. In the book, Self describes a future England which has been inundated with rising seas, leaving Hampstead as the only remaining part of London. The inhabitants of this area, unaware that the drowned city of London is so close by, know their island as Ham. The geography of the island, illustrated in a map at the start of the book, bears close resemblance to the modern areas of Hampstead which inspired it.

=== Contemporary narrative ===
Dave Rudman, a London taxi-driver, has a casual sexual encounter with a young woman named Michelle Brodie. The pair do not meet for another seven months until a heavily pregnant Michelle arrives at Dave's flat. They marry, and Michelle gives birth to a boy, Carl, but the marriage is unsuccessful, and Michelle eventually files for divorce, after which she resumes an earlier relationship with the television producer Cal Devenish. Dave descends into depression and increasingly unstable behaviour, and Michelle forbids him contact with their son, Carl. Dave writes a book that consists partly of an account of cab-driving in London, and partly of a rant against the unfairness of divorce and child access legislation. He has a single copy of the book printed on metal plates and buries it in the garden of the house in Hampstead where Michelle lives with Cal and Carl.

Dave suffers a breakdown, and comes under the care of the psychiatrist Anthony Bohm. Despite discovering that Carl is actually Cal's son, Dave slowly recovers his sanity and, during a stay in hospital, forms a relationship with Phyllis Vance, the mother of Steve, another patient. Dave regrets the content of his book, and attempts to dig it up from the Hampstead garden, but fails. Dave moves into Phyllis's cottage on the fringes of outer London and, under her guidance, writes a second book that repudiates the content of the first, and recommends a life based on tolerance and freedom. He mails the new book to Carl, but shortly afterwards is confronted at the cottage by loan sharks to whom he is heavily indebted. Dave brandishes a shotgun but is fatally injured in a struggle with the men, who arrange the scene to make the death look like suicide – an arrangement that is readily believed by Phyllis and the police. Carl and Cal then place Dave's second book in a metal film canister and bury it in their garden.

=== Future narrative ===
On the isolated island of Ham, a tiny community ekes out an existence from the land, assisted by semi-intelligent pig-like creatures known as 'motos' that are unique to the island. The community lives according to the severely enforced religion of the country known as "Ing" (i.e. England) whereby men and women lead separate lives but share childcare in accordance with the dictates of the Book of Dave, which is regarded as a sacred text, but which is evidently the book written by Dave Rudman and buried in a Hampstead garden some two thousand years earlier. A young male 'Hamster', Symun Devush, explores a forbidden area of the island and emerges claiming that he has discovered a second Book of Dave that repudiates the tenets of the first. Although Symun's revelations are popular, and he is lauded throughout the country as a prophet, religious authorities from the reconstructed city of New London send a deposition that arrests Symun on a charge of heresy (or 'flying') and transports him to New London, where he is physically and mentally broken, his tongue torn out, and returned to live in isolation on the desolate outcrop of land known as Nimar, not far from Ham.

Before being arrested, Symun conceives a son, Carl, who becomes an object of interest to Antone Böm, an exiled heretic. Böm believes that the second book of Dave discovered by Symun may be buried on the island, but his search for the book is a failure. Carl and Böm travel to New London in order to determine the fate of Symun and the second book but, soon after their arrival, the pair are arrested and sentenced to death. They escape, and discover Symun's fate on Nimar. Upon returning to Nimar, however, they find that Symun has died, and that his belongings include no second book but only a metal container filled with rotten debris. They return to Ham, where another delegation from New London is brutally mistreating the population and slaughtering the motos. As one of the Hamsters rebels against the slaughter, Carl and Böm reveal themselves.

== See also ==
- A Canticle for Leibowitz
