= Will Self =

English writer and journalist (born 1961)

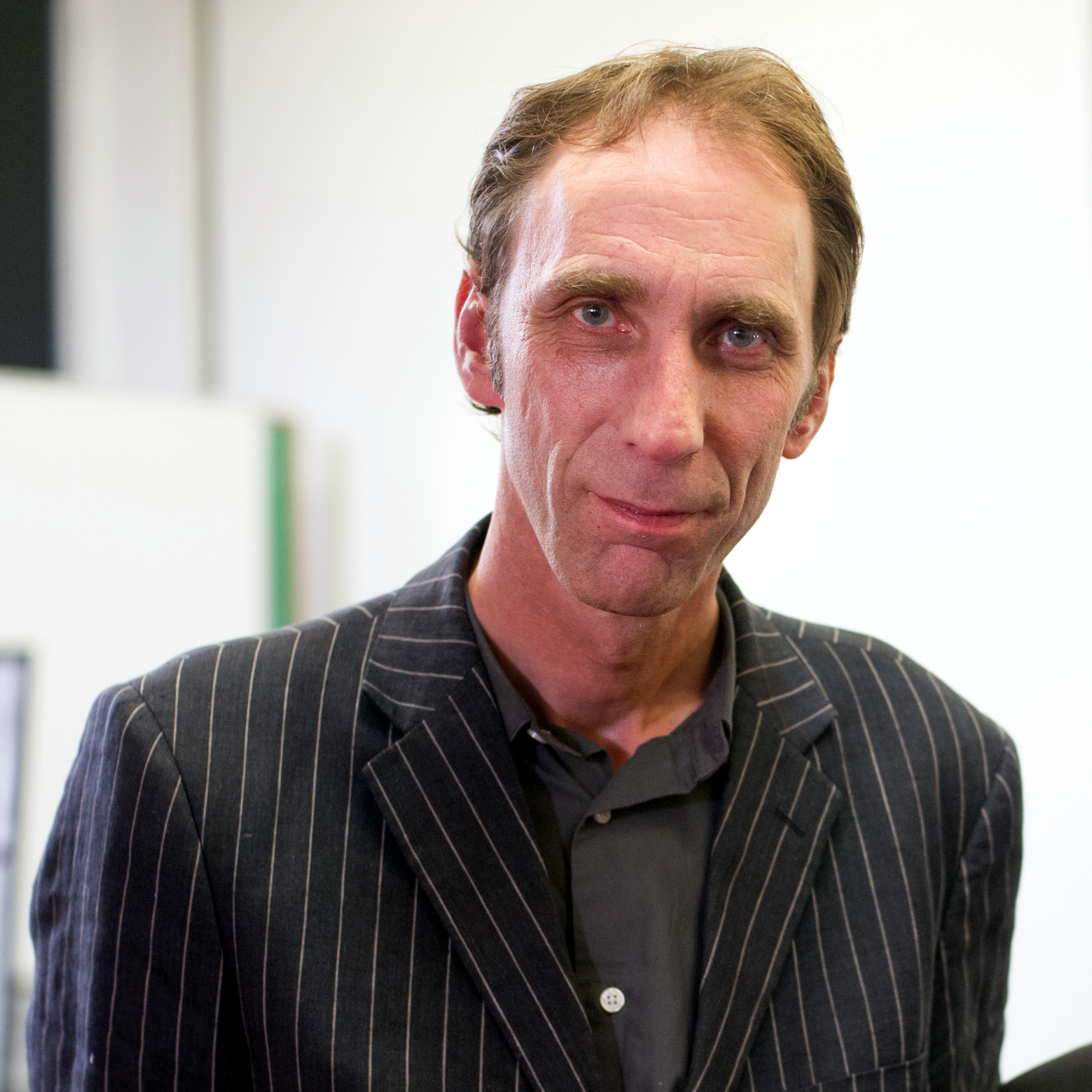
- Self in 2013
- Born: William Woodard Self; 26 September 1961 (age 65); London, England
- Education: University College School, Hampstead; Christ's College, Finchley; Exeter College, Oxford (BA)
- Occupations: Novelist; journalist
- Spouses: Kate Chancellor (m. 1989; div. 1997) Deborah Orr (m. 1997; div. 2018) Nelly Kaprièlian-Self (m. 2024)
- Relatives: Sir Henry Self (grandfather); Peter Self (father); Jonathan Self (brother)
- Writing career
- Period: 1991–present
- Notable works: The Book of Dave; Umbrella
- Notable awards: Geoffrey Faber Memorial Prize; 1991; Aga Khan Prize for Fiction; 1998; Bollinger Everyman Wodehouse Prize; 2008
- Will Self's voice Recorded January 2008 from the BBC Radio 4 programme Open Book
- Website: will-self.com

William Woodard Self (born 26 September 1961) is an English writer, journalist, political commentator and broadcaster. He has written 11 novels, five collections of shorter fiction, three novellas and nine collections of non-fiction writing. Self is currently an honorary Professor at Brunel University London, where his interests include psychogeography.

His 2002 novel Dorian, an Imitation was longlisted for the Booker Prize, and his 2012 novel Umbrella was shortlisted. His fiction is known for being satirical, grotesque and fantastical, and is predominantly set within his home city of London. His writing often explores mental illness, drug abuse and psychiatry.

Self is a regular contributor to publications including The Guardian, Harper's Magazine, The New York Times and the London Review of Books. He has been a columnist for The Observer, The Times, the New Statesman, the Evening Standard and The New European. His columns for Building Design on the built environment, and for The Independent Magazine on the psychology of place brought him to prominence as a thinker concerned with the politics of urbanism.

Self has also been a regular contributor to British television, initially as a guest on comic panel shows such as Have I Got News for You. In 2002, Self replaced Mark Lamarr on the BBC comedy panel show Shooting Stars for two series, but was himself replaced by comedian Jack Dee when the programme returned in 2008. He has since appeared on current affairs programmes such as Newsnight and Question Time. Self was a contributor to the former BBC Radio 4 programme A Point of View, to which he contributed radio essays delivered in his familiar "lugubrious tones". In 2013, Self took part in discussions about becoming the inaugural BBC Radio 4 Writer-in-Residence, but later withdrew.

== Early life ==
Self was born in Charing Cross Hospital and brought up in north London, between the suburbs of East Finchley and Hampstead Garden Suburb. His parents were Peter John Otter Self, Professor of Public Administration at the London School of Economics, and Elaine Rosenbloom, from Queens, New York, who worked as a publisher's assistant. His paternal grandfather was Sir Albert Henry Self. Self spent a year living in Ithaca in upstate New York.

Self's parents separated when he was nine, and divorced when he was 18. Despite the intellectual encouragement given by his parents, he was an emotionally confused and self-destructive child, self-harming with burns from cigarette embers and cuts from knives before beginning to use drugs.

Self was a voracious reader from a young age. When he was ten, he developed an interest in works of science fiction such as Frank Herbert's Dune and the works of J. G. Ballard and Philip K. Dick. Into his teenage years, Self claimed to have been "overawed by the canon", which stifled his ability to express himself. Self's use of drugs increased in step with his prolific reading. He started smoking cannabis at the age of 12, progressing by way of amphetamines, cocaine and LSD to heroin, which he started injecting at 18. Self struggled with mental health issues during this period, and aged 20 became a hospital outpatient.

Self attended University College School, an independent school for boys in Hampstead. He later attended Christ's College, Finchley, from where he went to Exeter College, Oxford, reading Philosophy, Politics and Economics and graduated with a third-class degree. At Oxford, he was editor of and frequent contributor to an underground left-wing student newspaper called Red Herring/Oxford Strumpet, copies of which are archived in the Bodleian Library.

== Career ==
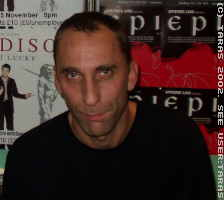
Self at a 2002 book signing

After graduating from the University of Oxford, Self worked for the Greater London Council, including as a road sweeper, while residing in Brixton. He pursued a career as a cartoonist for The New Statesman and other publications and as a stand-up comedian. He moved to Gloucester Road around 1985. In 1986 he entered a treatment centre in Weston-super-Mare, where he claimed that his heroin addiction was cured. In 1989, "through a series of accidents", he "blagged" his way into running a small publishing company.

The publication of his short story collection The Quantity Theory of Insanity brought him to public attention in 1991. Self was hailed as an original new talent by Salman Rushdie, Doris Lessing, Beryl Bainbridge, A. S. Byatt and Bill Buford. In 1993, he was nominated by Granta magazine as one of the 20 "Best Young British Novelists". Conversely, Self's second book, My Idea of Fun, was "mauled" by the critics.

Self joined The Observer as a columnist in 1995. In 1997 when covering the election campaign of John Major, he was caught, by a rival journalist, "snorting" heroin on the Prime Minister's jet; he was fired as a result. At the time, he argued "I'm a hack who gets hired because I do drugs". He joined The Times as a columnist in 1997. In 1999 he left The Times to join The Independent on Sunday, which he left in 2002 for the Evening Standard.

He has made many appearances on British television, especially as a panellist on Have I Got News for You and as a regular on Shooting Stars. Since 2008, Self has appeared five times on Question Time. He stopped appearing on Have I Got News for You, stating the show had become a pseudo-panel show. Between 2003 and 2006, he was a regular contributor to the BBC Two television series Grumpy Old Men.

Since 2009, Self has written two alternating fortnightly columns for New Statesman. The Madness of Crowds explores social phenomena and group behaviour, and in Real Meals he reviews high street food outlets. For a May 2014 article in The Guardian, he wrote: "the literary novel as an art work and a narrative art form central to our culture is indeed dying before our eyes", explaining in a July 2014 article that his royalty income had decreased "dramatically" over the previous decade. The July article followed the release of a study of the earnings of British authors that was commissioned by the Authors' Licensing and Collecting Society.

In 2012, Self was appointed Professor of Contemporary Thought at Brunel University London.

Self is a presenter for programmes on BBC Radio 4.

== Literary style ==
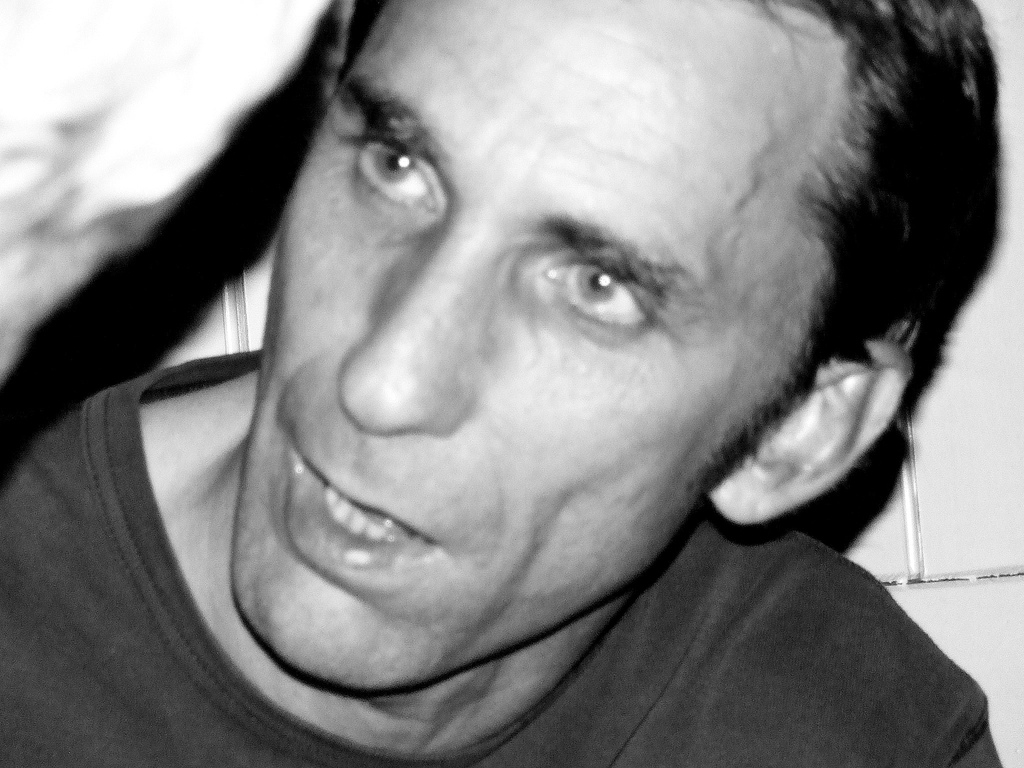
Self in 2007

Self has given his reason for writing as follows: "I don't write fiction for people to identify with and I don't write a picture of the world they can recognise. I write to astonish people." "What excites me is to disturb the reader's fundamental assumptions. I want to make them feel that certain categories within which they are used to perceiving the world are unstable."

When he was ten, he developed an interest in works of science fiction such as Frank Herbert's Dune and those of J. G. Ballard and Philip K. Dick. Self admires the work of Ballard, Alasdair Gray and Martin Amis. He has said that he previously admired William S. Burroughs but went off him. He has cited writers such as Jonathan Swift, Franz Kafka, Lewis Carroll and Joseph Heller as formative influences on his writing style. Other influences on his fiction include Hunter S. Thompson. Self credits Céline's book Journey to the End of the Night with inspiring him to write fiction.

Zack Busner is a recurring character in Self's fiction, appearing in the short story collections The Quantity Theory of Insanity, Grey Area and Dr. Mukti and Other Tales of Woe, as well as in the novels Great Apes, The Book of Dave, Umbrella and Shark. Busner is a psychiatrist and psychoanalyst practising in London and is prone to self-promotion at the expense of his patients. He is often the antagonist of the stories he appears in, although not always with villainous intent.

Among Self's admirers was the American critic Harold Bloom. Journalist Stuart Maconie has described him as "that rarity in modern cultural life, a genuine intellectual with a bracing command of words and ideas who is also droll, likeable and culturally savvy."

== Political views ==
In the 2015 general election, Self voted for the Labour Party in a general election for the first time since 1997. In May 2015, he wrote in The Guardian: "No, I'm no longer a socialist if to be one is to believe that a socialist utopia is attainable by some collective feat of will – but I remain a socialist, if 'socialism' is to be understood as an antipathy to vested interests and privileges neither deserved nor earned, and a strong desire for a genuinely egalitarian society." In March 2017, he wrote in the New Statesman: "Nowadays I think in terms of compassionate pragmatism: I'll leave socialism to Žižek and the other bloviators."

In July 2015, Self endorsed Jeremy Corbyn's campaign in the Labour Party leadership election. He said during a Channel 4 News interview that Corbyn represents a useful ideological divide within Labour, and could lead to the formation of a schism in the party.

Self is a British republican.

== Personal life ==
From 1989 to 1997, Self was married to Kate Chancellor. They have two children: a son, Alexis, and a daughter, Madeleine. They lived together in a terraced house just off the Portobello Road. In 1997, Self married journalist Deborah Orr, with whom he has sons Ivan and Luther. In 2012, Orr and Self were living in a Victorian townhouse in Stockwell, the roof, and part of the facade of which, partially collapsed, due possibly to 'wear and tear'. In 2017, Orr and Self separated, and Self was living in a ex-council flat in Stockwell. In October 2008, Self sent his younger children to private schools after they experienced bullying at state schools in Lambeth. In September 2018, Self was accused of "mental cruelty" by Orr in relation to their divorce, in a series of posts on Twitter. Orr died on 19 October 2019. As of 2024, Will Self is married to the French novelist Nelly Kaprièlian-Self. Self's 2024 novel Elaine is partially based on the diaries of his mother, who died in 1988. His brother is the author and journalist Jonathan Self.

=== Health ===
Self is 6 feet 5 inches (196 cm) tall. Since 1998, Self has abstained from drugs, except for caffeine and nicotine. In 2024, he wrote: "I gave up smoking – and indeed, consuming nicotine in any way, shape or form – almost six years ago". He had previously smoked a pipe. Self was diagnosed with blood disease polycythaemia vera in 2011. This developed into myelofibrosis. Self became a vegetarian in 2015, for aesthetic rather than ethical reasons, later describing himself as flexitarian rather than total vegetarian.

=== Jewish heritage ===
Self has discussed his Jewish heritage, by way of his mother, and its impact on his identity. In 2006, Self 'resigned' as a Jew as a protest against the Israeli invasion of Lebanon. In 2018, he stated in an interview with the BBC that he had rethought his position, due to the resurgence of anti-Semitism in Britain.

=== Other activities and interests ===
Self has described himself as a psychogeographer and modern flâneur, and has written about walks he has taken. In December 2006, he walked 26 miles (42 km) from his home in South London to Heathrow Airport. Upon arriving at Kennedy Airport he walked 20 miles (32 kilometres) from there to Manhattan. In August 2013, Self wrote of his anger following an incident in which he was stopped and questioned by police in Yorkshire while out walking with his 11-year-old son, on suspicion of being a paedophile. The police were alerted by a security guard at Bishop Burton College. He had asked the security guard for permission to cross the school grounds. Self collects vintage typewriters.

== Archive ==
In 2016, the British Library acquired Self's archive; the collection is a hybrid archive of paper and born-digital material. The Papers of Will Self are divided into two parts: family papers, and personal and literary papers. The papers can be accessed through the British Library catalogue. The archive consists of 24 large boxes of papers, artwork, audio-visual material and a hard disk drive.

== Awards ==
- 1991: Geoffrey Faber Memorial Prize for The Quantity Theory of Insanity
- 1998: Aga Khan Prize for Fiction from The Paris Review for Tough Tough Toys for Tough Tough Boys
- 2008: Bollinger Everyman Wodehouse Prize for Comic Fiction for The Butt

== Works ==
=== Novels ===
- Cock and Bull (1992)
- My Idea of Fun (1993)
- The Sweet Smell of Psychosis (illustrated novella) (1996)
- Great Apes (1997)
- How the Dead Live (2000)
- Dorian, an Imitation (2002)
- The Book of Dave (2006)
- The Butt (2008)
- Walking to Hollywood (2010)
- Umbrella (2012)
- Shark (2014)
- Phone (2017)
- Elaine (2024)
- The Quantity Theory of Morality (2026)

=== Short story collections ===
- The Quantity Theory of Insanity (1991)
- Grey Area (1994)
- Tough, Tough Toys for Tough, Tough Boys (1998)
- Dr. Mukti and Other Tales of Woe (2004)
- Liver: A Fictional Organ with a Surface Anatomy of Four Lobes (2008)
- The Undivided Self: Selected Stories (2010)

=== Non-fiction ===
Self has also compiled several books of work from his newspaper and magazine columns, which mix interviews with counter-culture figures, restaurant reviews and literary criticism.

- Junk Mail (1996)
- Perfidious Man (2000) photography by David M. Gamble
- Sore Sites (2000)
- Feeding Frenzy (2001)
- Psychogeography (2007)
- Psycho Too (2009)
- The Unbearable Lightness of Being a Prawn Cracker (2012)
- Will (2019)
- Why Read: Selected Writings 2001–2021 (2022)

=== Television ===
- The Minor Character – Self's short story was turned into a short film on Sky Arts, which starred David Tennant as "Will".
