= Political Takeout =

British political comedy podcast

- Genre: Politics

Cast and voices
- Hosted by: Rupert Myers; Bobby Friedman

Publication
- Original release: 1 March 2013
- Updates: Weekly

Political Takeout was a weekly, 30-minute UK politics and comedy podcast series hosted by Rupert Myers and Bobby Friedman in association with The Independent. The show features a recurring comic feature presented by former Liberal Democrat MP Lembit Öpik. Previous guests of the show have included Alan Johnson, Matthew Parris, Stella Creasy, and Hugo Rifkind among others. Younger political commentators like Tim Stanley and Rowenna Davis are regularly invited on.

The show regularly hosted segments with a comic element, featuring broadcasters such as Sam Delaney and Rich Peppiatt. Interviews with Jonathan Aitken and Vicky Pryce have been reported elsewhere.

== Hosts ==
- Rupert Myers
- Bobby Friedman
- A comedy slot with Lembit Öpik

== See also ==
- Political podcast
