= Jonathan Self =

British journalist (born 1959)

Jonathan Otter Self (born 11 March 1959 in Hammersmith, London) is an English author and journalist.

== Early life ==
Self was raised in Hampstead, London. His father was the British journalist and academic Peter Self. His mother, Elaine (born Rosenbloom), was American and worked in publishing. His brother, Will Self, is a novelist and broadcaster.

== Career ==
Self began his career as an advertising copywriter and in 1982 founded Self Direct, a direct-marketing agency. He sold the business in 1993.

In 2001, Self published an autobiography, Self Abuse. The Times stated that Self "is a talented writer with an extraordinary family history to relate. He catalogues the failings of a family so dysfunctional and cruel that even with his talent for sardonic one-liners the tone is one of unrelenting despair." A humour column in The Guardian offered a one-line summary of the book: "The brother of the more famous Will ODs in therapy and splurges the results over 247 pages".

Self has since written a number of other books, including The Teenagers Guide to Money which was ranked as the #5 best investing book for teens by a UK financial education website. He has contributed regularly to the British media including Country Life, The Times, The Daily Telegraph and The Mail on Sunday. In 2009 he collaborated with Arabella Lennox-Boyd on "Welcome to Dream Acres", a Country Life series about landscape gardening.

He is one of the founders of Honey's, an ethical dog food company, which is the subject of one of his books.

Self acts as a Special Adviser to the World Land Trust, an environmental charity.

In 2016, he made a Radio 4 Charity Appeal on behalf of Room to Read.

Self is now a trustee of the Rainforest Trust.

== Personal life ==
Self is married. He and his wife Rose have seven children between them.

== Works ==
- Self Abuse (John Murray, 2001), a memoir
- The Teenager's Guide to Money (Quercus, 2007), a personal finance guide for teenagers
- Honey's Natural Feeding Handbook for Dogs (Mammoth, 2012), a guide to diets for dogs
- Emerald (Thames & Hudson, 2013), a guide to the world's emerald trade
- Good Money (Head of Zeus, 2017), a guide on how to become an ethical entrepreneur
