= My Idea of Fun =

1993 novel by Will Self

- First edition
- Author: Will Self
- Language: English
- Publisher: Bloomsbury Publishing
- Publication date: 16 Sep 1993
- Publication place: United Kingdom
- Media type: Print Paperback
- Pages: 309 pp
- ISBN: 0-7475-1591-3
- OCLC: 62891878

My Idea of Fun is the second novel by Will Self, and was published in 1993.

== Plot summary ==
A lonely boy grows up just outside Brighton in a caravan park with his over-sexual mother and the tenant Mr Broadhurst, who takes the boy on a disturbing and often violent journey.

The novel works as a strange Bildungsroman, in which the main character, Ian Wharton, learns the art of black magic from Broadhurst, who is also known as the Fat Controller. At the Fat Controller's behest Ian engages in a series of strange acts including time travel and trips to an alternate reality called the Land of Children's jokes, a grotesque alternate universe inhabited by the menacing and deformed characters from jokes. The protagonist's education culminates in bizarre rites of bestiality and necrophilia. However, he finds that in exchange for knowledge of the black arts Broadhurst begins to take over more and more aspects of his life.

The novel may also be seen as an example of an unreliable narrator, as it is unclear whether the strange events in the novel are meant to be real or hallucinatory.

== Reviews ==
Nicholas Lezard said of the book that "No one else I can think of writes about contemporary Britain with such elan, energy and witty intelligence. Rejoice."
