= Augustus Newman =

British Victoria Cross recipient (1904–1972)

Lieutenant Colonel Augustus Newman VC OBE TD DL
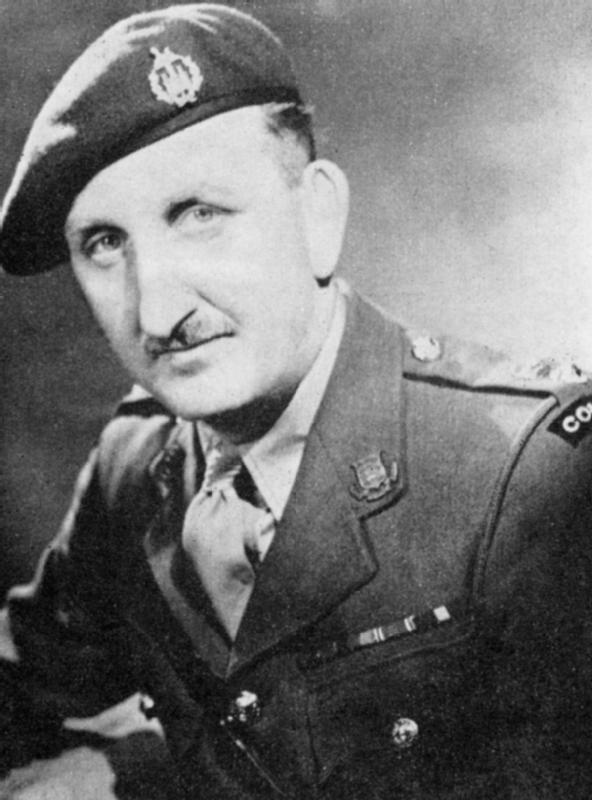
- Charles Newman during the Second World War
- Born: Augustus Charles Newman; 19 August 1904; Chigwell, Essex
- Died: 26 April 1972 (aged 67); Sandwich, Kent
- Burial place: Barham Crematorium
- Military career
- Allegiance: United Kingdom
- Branch: British Army
- Service years: 1925–1959
- Rank: Lieutenant Colonel
- Service number: 33927
- Units: The Essex Regiment; No. 3 Independent Company; No. 1 Special Service Battalion; Engineer and Railway Staff Corps
- Commands: No. 2 Commando; 21st Special Air Service Regiment (Artists)
- Conflicts: Second World War
- Awards: Victoria Cross; Officer of the Order of the British Empire; Territorial Decoration; Legion of Honour (France); Croix de Guerre (France)
- Other work: Deputy Lieutenant of Essex

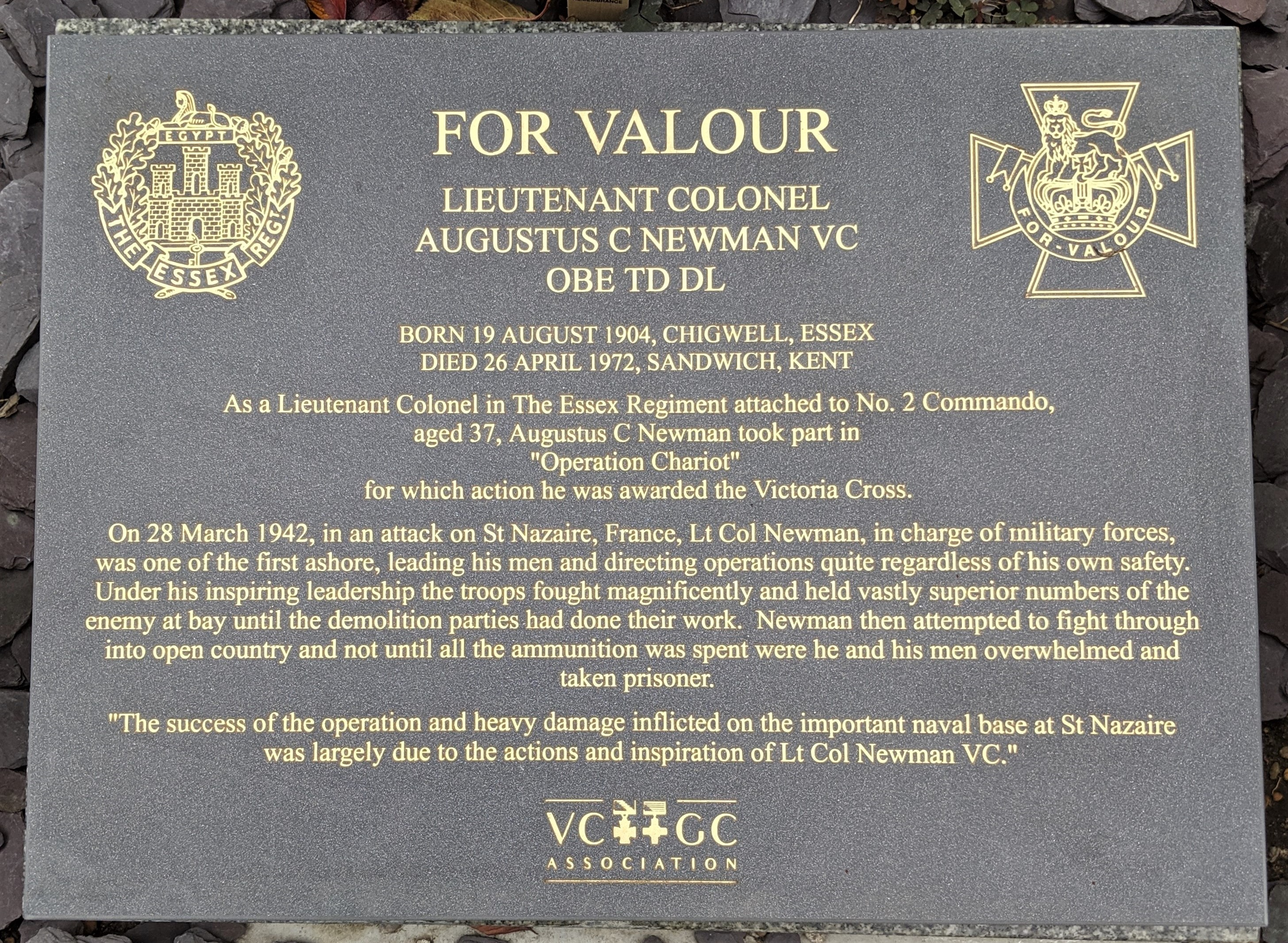
Plaque in St Peter's Churchyard, Sandwich, Kent

Lieutenant Colonel Augustus Charles Newman, VC, OBE, TD, DL (19 August 1904 – 26 April 1972) was a British Army officer and recipient of the Victoria Cross, the highest award for gallantry in the face of the enemy that can be awarded to British and Commonwealth forces.

== Early life and military service ==
Newman was educated at Bancroft's School, Essex. On leaving school he joined a firm of Civil Engineering and Public Works Contractors and was commissioned into the part-time Territorial Army in 1925, rising to the rank of major by 1939.

He was 37 years old and a lieutenant colonel in The Essex Regiment, British Army, attached to No. 2 Commando during the Second World War, when Newman was awarded the Victoria Cross (VC) for the St. Nazaire Raid.

On 28 March 1942 in the attack on St. Nazaire, France, Lieutenant Colonel Newman was in charge of the military forces and he was one of the first ashore, leading his men and directing operations "utterly regardless of his own safety", according to his citation. Under his inspiring leadership the troops held vastly superior numbers of the enemy at bay until the demolition parties had done their work. "The outstanding gallantry and devotion to duty of this fearless officer, his brilliant leadership and initiative, were largely responsible for the success of this perilous operation", the citation noted. The colonel then attempted to fight through into open country and not until all the ammunition was spent were he and his men overwhelmed and taken prisoner.

== Subsequent career ==
After the Second World War, Newman continued in the Territorial Army, subsequently commanding 21 (Artists) Special Air Service Regiment. He served as Deputy Lieutenant of Essex, 1946 to 1948. On 1 October 1959 he was appointed Major in the Engineer and Railway Staff Corps.

His VC is on display in the Lord Ashcroft Gallery at the Imperial War Museum, London.

== Bibliography ==
- John, Laffin (1997). British VCs of World War 2: A Study in Heroism. Sutton Publishing. ISBN 0-7509-1026-7.
- Ingleton, Roy (2011). Kent VCs. Pen and Sword Books. ISBN 978-1848844094.
