= Peter Salsbury =

Peter Leslie Salsbury (born June 1949) was chief executive of Marks & Spencer from November 1998 to 2000.
