= Dorian, an Imitation =

British novel by Will Self

- First edition
- Author: Will Self
- Language: English
- Publisher: Viking Press
- Publication date: 26 September 2002
- Publication place: United Kingdom
- Media type: Print Hardcover & Paperback
- Pages: 278 pp
- ISBN: 0-670-88996-2

Dorian, an Imitation is a British novel by Will Self. The book is a modern take on Oscar Wilde's The Picture of Dorian Gray. The novel was originally published by Viking Press in 2002 and subsequently by Penguin in 2003. Self was originally asked to adapt the 1890 Wilde novel into a film screenplay, but this project did not come to fruition. Instead, Self took this uncompleted screenplay and re-worked it into a novel, which he described as "an imitation - and a homage" to the Wilde original.

Self draws correlations between the life of his character Dorian and Diana, Princess of Wales, particularly over the time period from June 1981, the time of the Wedding of Charles, Prince of Wales, and Lady Diana Spencer, up to 1997, the year of Princess Diana's death. The novel adheres closely to Wilde's original in its overall plot, with retaining the names of the key characters Dorian Gray, Henry Wootton, and Basil Hallward (with Hallward receiving the short nickname 'Baz'). Updates in Self's novel compared to the Wilde original include the following:

- Basil Hallward's oil portrait of Dorian Gray (Wilde) becomes Basil Hallward's video installation 'Cathode Narcissus' (Self).
- In Self's scenario, Dorian becomes an asymptomatic carrier of Acquired Immunodeficiency Syndrome and infects others with the disease, including a former girlfriend. Dorian remains physically unchanged, whilst the 'Cathode Narcissus' video installation depicts the increasing corruption of Dorian and what should normally be the physical toll of AIDS on his person.
- Sybil Vane, the aspiring actress in the Wilde novel, becomes the teenage Soho rentboy Herman in the Self novel. The prussic acid (Wilde) is transposed into heroin (Self).
- Henry Wootton no longer has his aristocratic title in the Self novel.

== See also ==
- Adaptations of The Picture of Dorian Gray
