= Great Apes (novel) =

1997 novel by Will Self

- First edition
- Author: Will Self
- Language: English
- Publisher: Bloomsbury Publishing
- Publication date: 15 May 1997
- Publication place: United Kingdom
- Media type: Print Paperback
- Pages: 288
- ISBN: 978-0-7475-2987-3
- OCLC: 37421032
- Dewey Decimal: 823/.914 21
- LC Class: PR6069.E3654 G73 1997b

Great Apes is a 1997 novel by Will Self.

== Plot synopsis ==
After a night of drug use, Simon Dykes wakes up in a world where chimpanzees have evolved to be the dominant species with self-awareness, while humans are the equivalent of chimps in our world.

== Reviews ==
"Planet of the Apes meets Nineteen Eighty-Four. Simon Dykes wakes up one morning to a world where chimpanzees are self-aware and humans are the equivalent of chimps in our world. Simon has lived a life of quick drugs, shallow artists and meaningless sex. But this London, much like a PG Tips advert, has chimps in human clothing but with their chimpness intact. The carnivalesque world is humorous, gripping and provocative."
