= Nairne (surname) =

Nairne is a surname of Scottish origin. Notable people with the surname include:

- Andrew Nairne (born 1960), British arts administrator
- Carolina, Baroness Nairne (1766–1845), Scottish songwriter and song collector
- General Sir Charles Edward Nairne (1836–1899), Commander-in-Chief in India
- Edward Nairne (1726–1806), English optician and scientific instrument maker
- Lieutenant-Colonel John Nairne (1731–1802), Scottish-Canadian soldier and seigneur
- Sir Gordon Nairne, 1st Baronet (1861–1945), British director of the Bank of England and a BBC governor
- Sir Patrick Nairne (1921–2013), British civil servant
- Rob Nairne (born 1954), American football player
- Sandy Nairne (born 1953), British art museum director
- Thomas Nairne (died 1715), Scottish trader
- William Murray, 2nd Lord Nairne (1657–1730), 2nd Baron Nairne

== See also ==
- Lord Nairne
- Lady Nairne (disambiguation)
- Nairne Baronets
- Sir Nairne Stewart Sandeman, 1st Baronet
- Nairne (disambiguation)
