= Frank May =

Frank May may refer to:

- Frank May (cashier), Chief Cashier of the Bank of England from 1873 to 1893
- Frank May (cricketer) (1862–1907), English cricketer and stockbroker
