= Peppiatt =

Peppiatt is a surname. Notable people with the surname include:

- Ernest Peppiatt (1917–1979), English weightlifter
- Frank Peppiatt (1927–2012), Canadian television producer and screenwriter
- Kenneth Peppiatt (1893–1983), Chief Cashier of the Bank of England
- Lucy Peppiatt, British theologian and author
- Michael Peppiatt (born 1941), English art historian

== Other uses ==
- Peppiatt and Aylesworth, Canadian television comedy team
