= Kentfield (disambiguation) =

Kentfield, California is a place in California.

Kentfield may also refer to:

- Richard Kentfield (1862–1904), English cricketer
- Graham Kentfield (born 1940), chief cashier of the Bank of England
