= Ernest Musgrave Harvey =

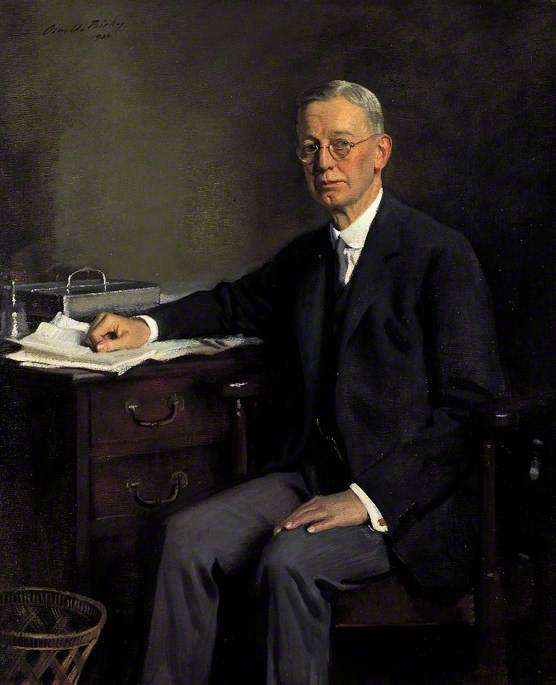
Sir Ernest Musgrave Harvey, by Oswald Birley

Sir Ernest Musgrave Harvey, 1st Baronet, KBE (27 July 1867 – 17 December 1955), was a British banker who was the Chief Cashier of the Bank of England from 1918 to 1925 and Deputy Governor of the Bank of England from 1929 to 1936.

== Life ==
Harvey was the third son of the Rev. Charles Harvey and his wife Frances Harriet Brewster, born in Hampstead. He was educated at Marlborough College, and began work in 1885 as a clerk at the Bank of England. He became Deputy Chief Cashier there in 1902, and in 1918 was successor to Gordon Nairne as Chief Cashier. He was succeeded by Cyril Patrick Mahon.

== Honours ==
Harvey was appointed a Commander of the Order of the British Empire (CBE) in 1917, and was promoted to Knight Commander (KBE) in 1920. On 19 January 1933 he was created a Baronet of Threadneedle Street in the City of London.

== Family ==
Harvey married in 1896 Sophia Paget, daughter of Capt. Catesby Paget and granddaughter of Berkeley Paget, a Member of Parliament. The couple had three daughters and one son.

== See also ==
- Harvey baronets

Baronetage of the United Kingdom
New creation	Baronet (of Threadneedle Street); 1933–1955	Succeeded by Richard Musgrave Harvey
