= Nairne =

Nairne may be:

- Nairne, South Australia
- Nairne railway station, the former railway station located in the South Australian town of Nairne
- Lord Nairne
- Lady Nairne (disambiguation)
- Nairne Baronets
- Nairne (surname)
