= John Kendrick (cashier) =

John Kendrick (or Kenrick) was the first Chief Cashier of the Bank of England.

== Career ==
Kendrick was appointed "First Cashier" at the third meeting of the court of the bank on 30 July 1694. Nineteen officials were appointed on that day, each of whom was required to deposit a security of between £500 and £5,000 according to the responsibility of their position. Kendrick was required to provide £5,000 and started his work at a salary of £200 per annum. Later in 1694, Kendrick was replaced as Chief Cashier by Thomas Speed.
