= Jewson (disambiguation) =

Jewson is a British chain of builders' merchants.

Jewson may also refer to:

- Charles Jewson, chief cashier of the Bank of England
- Charles Jewson (Lord Mayor), Lord Mayor of Norwich, son of Percy and father of Richard
- Dorothy Jewson (1884–1964), British member of Parliament
- Norman Jewson (1884–1975), architect-craftsman of the Arts and Crafts movement
- Percy Jewson (1881–1962), English businessman and National Liberal politician
- Richard Jewson (born 1944), British businessman
- Vicky Jewson (born 1985), English screenwriter and film director
