= Thomas Rippon =

Thomas Rippon may refer to:

- Pip Rippon (Thomas Rippon, 1888–1950), English footballer
- Thomas Rippon (cashier) (1760–1835), Chief Cashier of the Bank of England
