= Matt Marshall =

Matt Marshall may refer to:

- Matt Marshall (politician), Washington state respresentative-elect
- Matt Marshall (writer), writer on The Simpsons
- Matt Marshall (golfer) (born 1985), American golfer

== See also ==
- Matthew Marshall (1791–1873), chief cashier of the Bank of England
