= Aslett =

Aslett is a surname. Notable people with the surname include:

- Alfred Aslett (1901–1980), English rugby union player
- Derek Aslett (born 1958), English former cricketer who played for Kent County Cricket Club between 1981 and 1987
- Don Aslett (1935–2024), American entrepreneur and author who specializes in cleaning and housekeeping products, services, and techniques
- Robert Aslett (1754–unknown), English banker, assistant cashier at the Bank of England
