= Patrick Mahon =

Patrick Mahon may refer to:

- Patrick Herbert Mahon (1890-1924) was a British criminal found guilty in 1924 of the murder of Emily Bielby Kaye in the case of the "Crumbles murders".
- Patrick Joseph Mahon (Paddy Mahon) (c.1907 – 20 July 1945) was an Irish golfer.
- Anthony Patrick Mahon (1921-1972), known as Patrick, British cryptanalyst during World War II, and executive at John Lewis. He was the son of Cyril Patrick Mahon.

== See also ==
- Patrick Mahony
- Patrick Mahoney
- James Patrick Mahon
