= Patrick Forbes (minister) =

Scottish minister

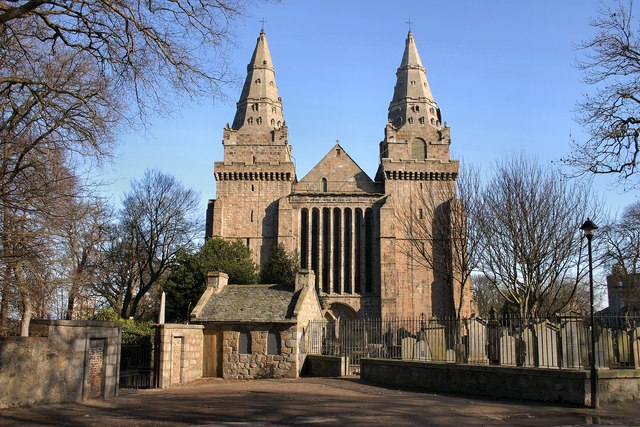
Old Machar Church

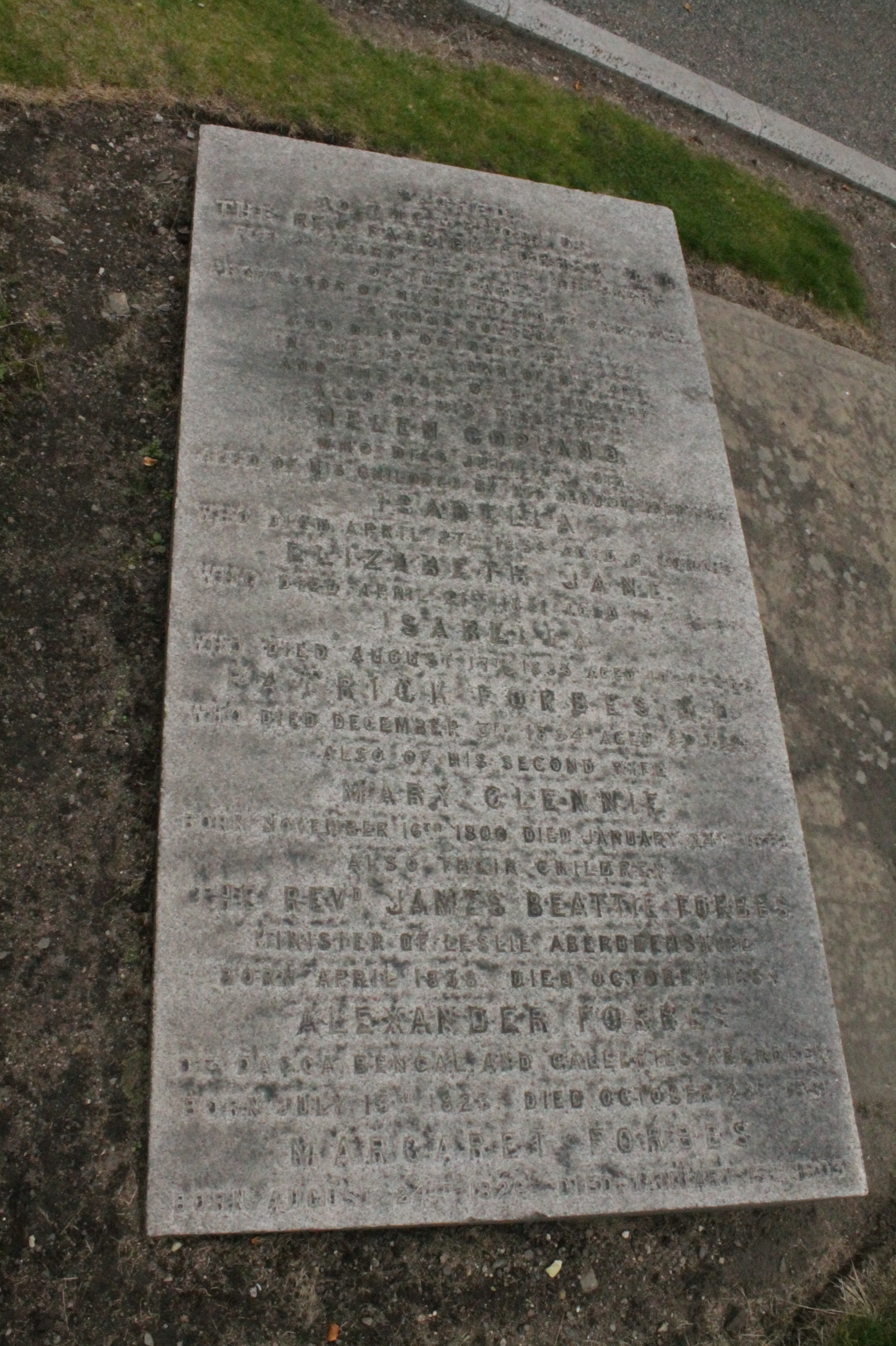
The grave of Rev Patrick Forbes, St Machar's Cathedral

Patrick Forbes (17 June 1776–13 October 1847) was a Scottish minister who served as Moderator of the General Assembly of the Church of Scotland for the period 1829 to 1830. He was Professor of Humanity and Chemistry at the University of Aberdeen.

== Life ==
He was born in Aberdeen on 17 June 1776 the son of Rev Francis Forbes of Camphill, and his first wife, Isabella Copland. He was elder half-brother to Sir Francis William Forbes, Chief Justice of Newfoundland and later New South Wales. He studied at Marischal College in Aberdeen graduating MA in 1793. In 1793/4 he was schoolmaster of Grange. He was licensed to preach by the Presbytery of Strathbogie in 1797.

He was minister of Boharm from 1800 to 1816 but moved to Old Machar in Aberdeen where he remained for most of his adult life, and from 1816 he was also professor of both Humanity and Chemistry at King's College, Aberdeen, replacing Prof Ogilvie.

In 1828 he succeeded Stevenson McGill as Moderator of the General Assembly, the highest position within the Church of Scotland.

He died in Aberdeen on 13 October 1847 and is buried in the churchyard of St Machar's Cathedral.

== Family ==
He was married twice. In 1800 he married Helen Copland, thought to be a cousin, she died in 1816 and in 1821 he married Mary Glennie (1800–1879). He had two children by his first marriage and a further eleven by the second.

At least two of his sons became ministers: John Forbes (1802–1899) in Aberdeen, and James Beattie Forbes (1838-1884) minister of Leslie in Fife. John served as Professor of Oriental Languages at Aberdeen University, wrote Predestination and Freewill, and the Westminster Confession of Faith and is buried next to his father. Another son, George Forbes, was Chief Cashier of the Bank of England from 1866–73.

== Gallery ==
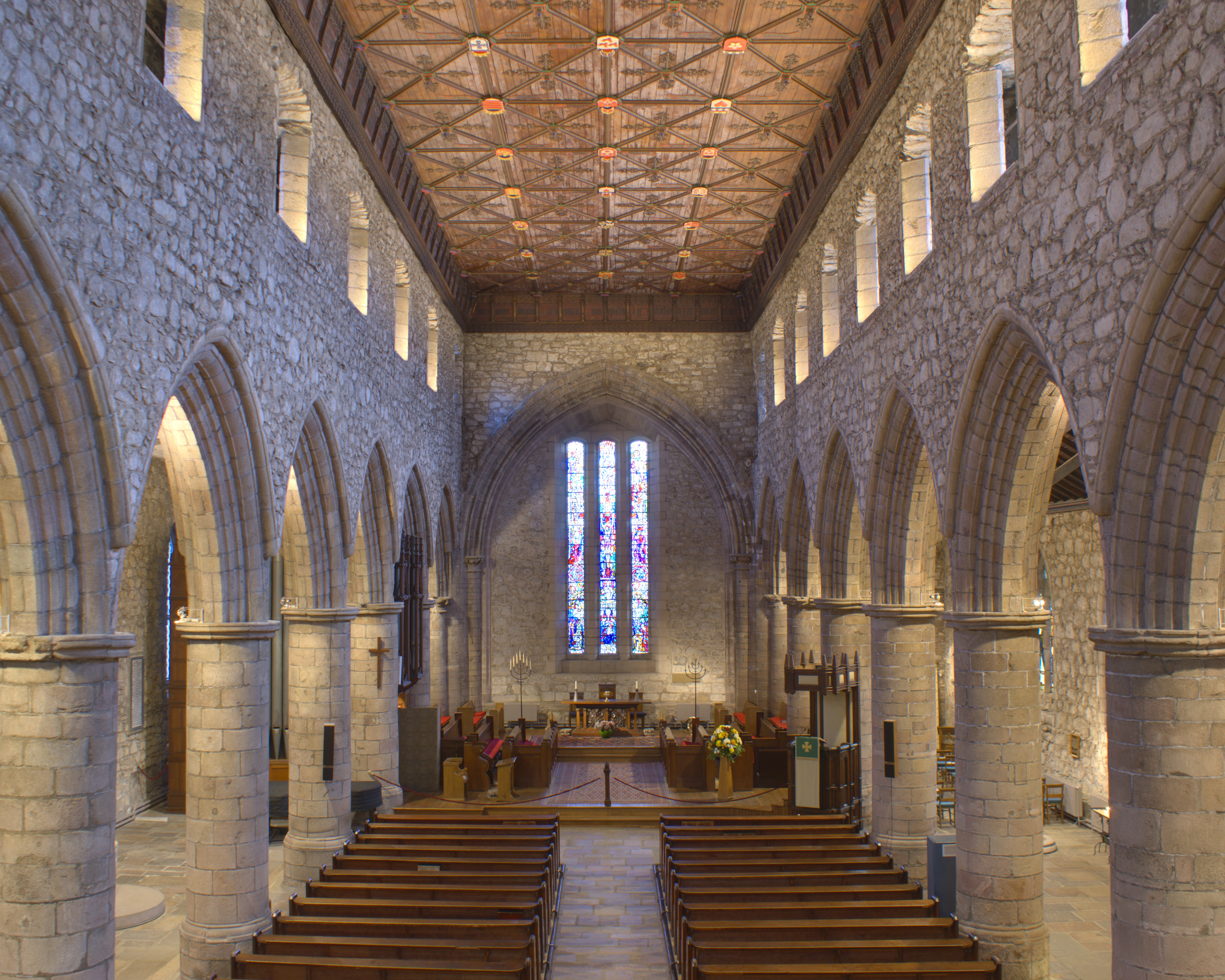
The interior of Old Machar Church in Aberdeen
