= Henry Hase =

Henry Hase may refer to:

- Henry Hase (politician) (1847–1929), American politician
- Henry Hase (cashier) (1763–1829), chief cashier of the Bank of England
