= Horace Bowen =

Chief Cashier of the Bank of England (1841-1902)

Horace George Bowen
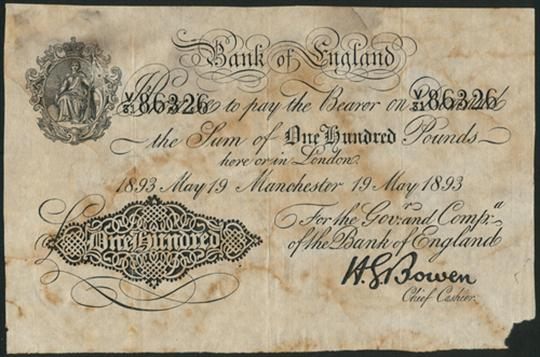
- A Horace Bowen signed Bank of England 1893 £100 banknote
- Born: 1841; United Kingdom
- Died: 6 May 1902 (aged 60–61); Barton-on-Sea, Hampshire, England
- Occupation: Banker
- Known for: Chief Cashier of the Bank of England

Horace George Bowen (1841 – 6 May 1902) was the Chief Cashier of the Bank of England from 1893 to 1902.

== Biography ==
Bowen entered the service of the Bank of England in 1860, where he stayed throughout his career. He was attached to the chief accountant´s department, where he was Deputy Chief accountant, and from 1888 Chief Accountant. In 1893 he succeeded Frank May as Chief Cashier, and thus became the person responsible for issuing banknotes at the Bank of England and the director of the divisions which provide the Bank of England's banking infrastructure.

He resigned due to illness in January 1902, and was replaced as Chief Cashier by John Nairne.

Bowen died shortly thereafter, at Barton-on-Sea, Hampshire, on 6 May 1902.
