= John Page (banker) =

John Brangwyn Page
- Page in a Bank of England portrait photograph
- Born: August 23, 1923
- Died: February 2, 2005 (aged 81)
- Education: Highgate School
- Alma mater: King's College, Cambridge
- Occupation: Banker
- Employer: Bank of England
- Known for: Chief Cashier of the Bank of England (1970–1980)
- Spouse: Gloria Vail
- Children: 2

John Brangwyn Page (died 2 February 2005) was a British banking executive who served as the Chief Cashier of the Bank of England from 1970 to 1980. The signature of the Chief Cashier appears on British banknotes. Page was replaced as Chief Cashier by David Somerset.

While at the bank, Page advised on the financing of the Channel Tunnel.

== Early life and education ==
Page was born on 23 August 1923 and grew up in Highgate, where he attended Highgate School. He began studying at King's College, Cambridge, in 1941, but his studies were interrupted by World War II, during which he served in the Royal Air Force and flew Spitfires. He returned to Cambridge after the war, switched to economics, and graduated in 1948.

== Career ==
=== Bank of England ===
Page spent most of his professional life at the Bank of England, with a period seconded to the International Monetary Fund in Washington, D.C. (1953–1956). He was appointed Chief Cashier in 1970 and served until 1980, when he was succeeded by David Somerset.

In the same period, Page advised on financing aspects of the Channel Tunnel.

At the end of the 1970s, the Bank's structure was revised and the office of Chief Cashier was removed. Page remained as an executive director and retired in 1982.

=== Later appointments ===
After leaving the Bank of England, Page served as chairman of the Agricultural Mortgage Corporation and held directorships at Standard Chartered and the Nationwide Building Society.

== Personal life and death ==
In 1948, Page married Gloria Vail, with whom he had two children. He died on 2 February 2005.
