= Robert Aslett =

Robert Aslett (born 9 August 1754) was a British banker who embezzled approximately £820,000 in Exchequer bills. Aslett was an assistant cashier at the Bank of England under his uncle Abraham Newland. In 1803, he was condemned to death; however his sentence was commuted on the condition he leave the country. Aslett's disgrace led to the appointment of Henry Hase as chief cashier.

Aslett was born in London to Robert and Elizabeth Aslett, and educated at Merchant Taylors' School.

Despite his imprisonment at Newgate Prison, his privileged life continued by bribing the guards. Recalled the Leicester Chronicle in 1857:

Mr. Robert Aslett, a cashier in the Bank of England, was a prisoner in Newgate for re-issuing dividend-warrants, by which nefarious practice he possessed himself of many thousand pounds. By this dishonest means of obtaining money he was enabled to live in gaol in case and luxury. To obtain the privilege of receiving bis carriage acquaintances within his prison apartment, he gave each of three turnkeys a douceur of half a guinea weekly; sod to dress himself in a mode fit for company he wu attended by a fashionable hairdresser of Fleet Street, to whom he paid half a crown daily for bis services. He dined sumptuously, and spared no expense to render his life in prison enjoyable. After re-maining in Newgate for some years, he received his liberty on the condition of residing abroad.

— Leicester Chronicle, 27 June 1857
