= David Somerset (banker) =

David Henry FitzRoy Somerset (19 June 1930 – 25 October 2014) was Chief Cashier of the Bank of England from 1980 to 1988. The signature of the Chief Cashier appears on British banknotes. Somerset was replaced as Chief Cashier by Malcolm Gill.

Somerset was the grandson of the third Baron Raglan. He was educated at Mount House School (now known as Mount Kelly) in Tavistock, Devon and Wellington College. He graduated from Peterhouse, Cambridge, in 1956.

Somerset married Ruth Ivy Wildbur in 1955. They had two children:

- Louise Charlotte Somerset (born 28 August 1956); and
- Henry Robert Fitzroy Somerset (born 13 February 1961).

The family lived at White Wickets, Boarshead, near Crowborough.

In later life, he was made an emeritus fellow of Peterhouse, Cambridge from 1997 to 2014, having been a fellow from 1988 to 1997.
