= William Miller (cashier) =

Chief Cashier of the Bank of England from 1864 to 1866

William Miller was the Chief Cashier of the Bank of England from 1864 to 1866. Miller was replaced as Chief Cashier by George Forbes.
