= Stevenson McGill =

Scottish minister

The Reverend Stevenson M'Gill
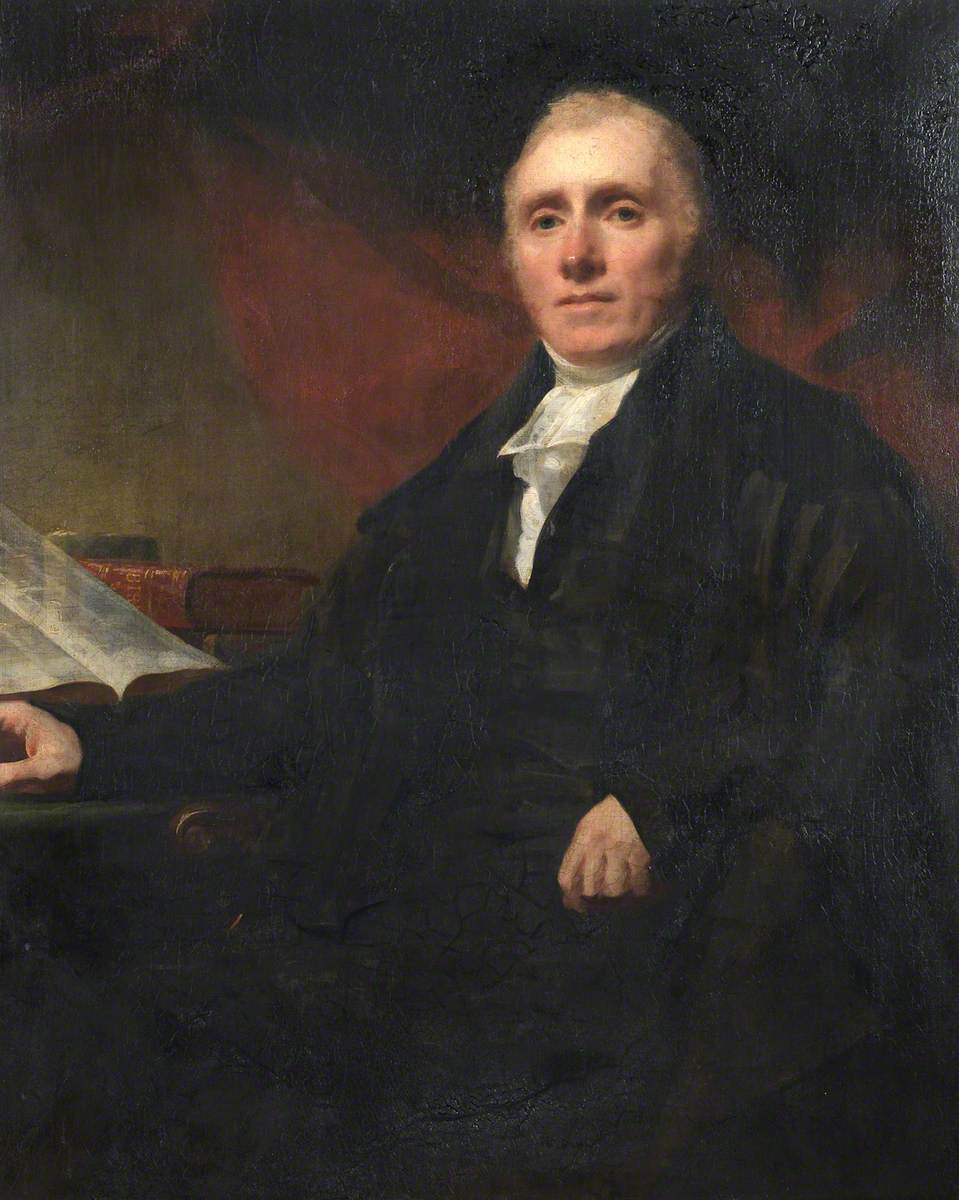
- Stevenson McGill by Henry Raeburn

Personal details
- Born: 1765
- Died: 1840 (aged 74–75)

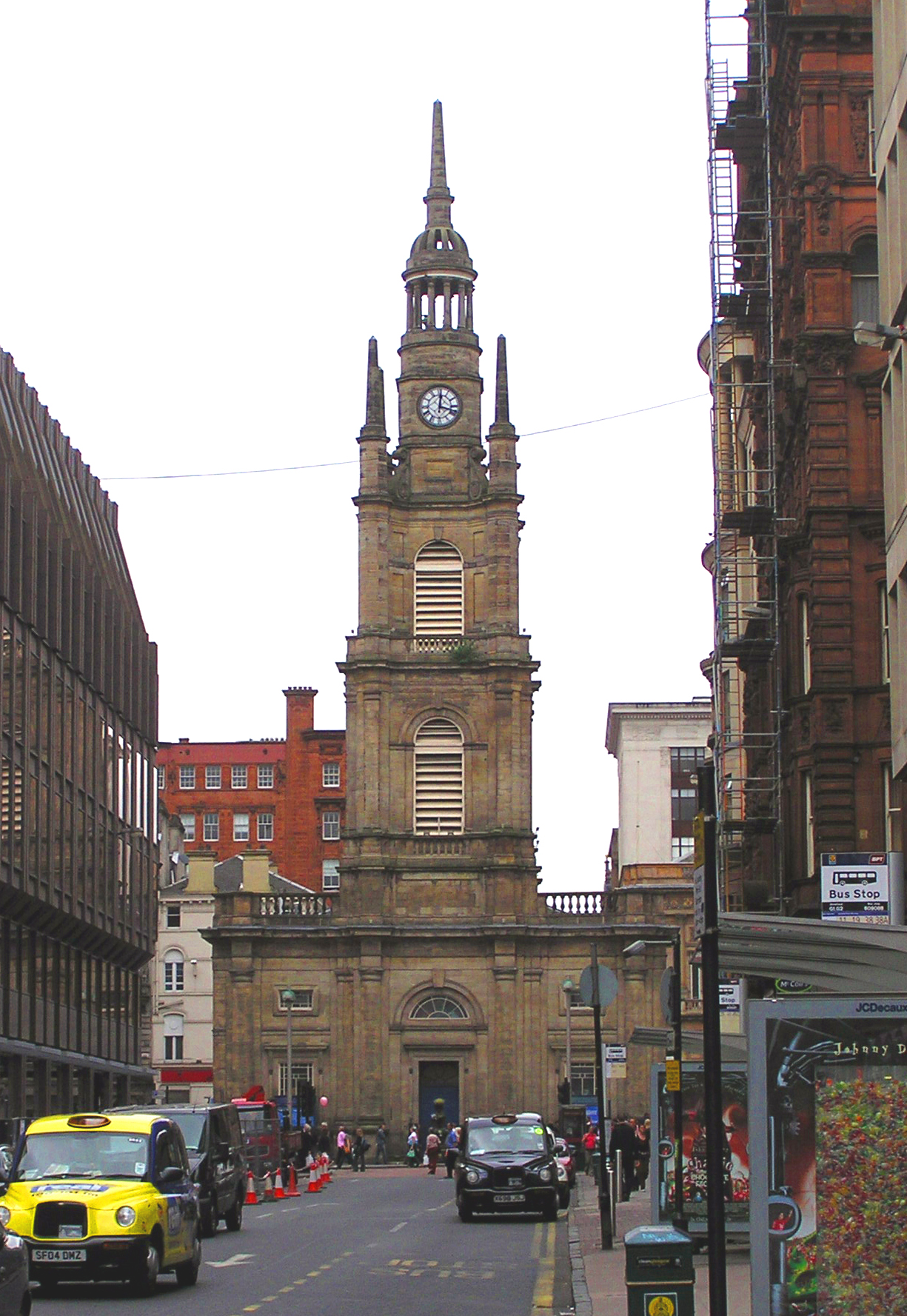
Tron Kirk in Glasgow

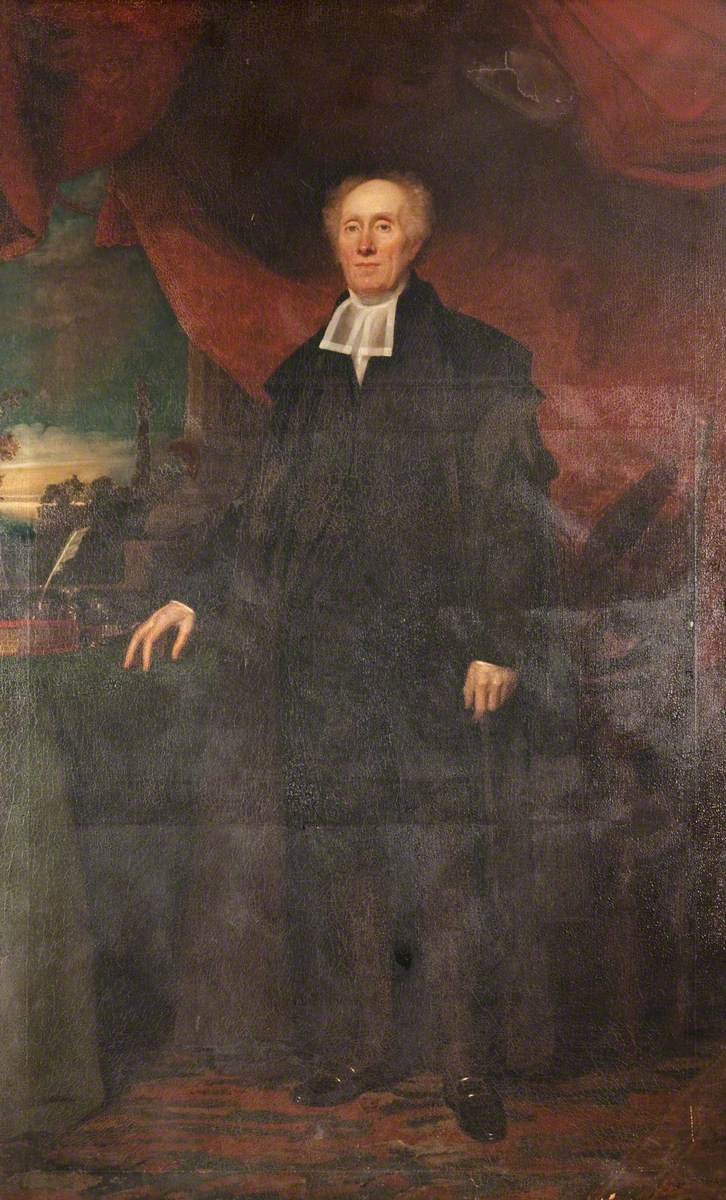
Stevenson MacGill by John Graham-Gilbert

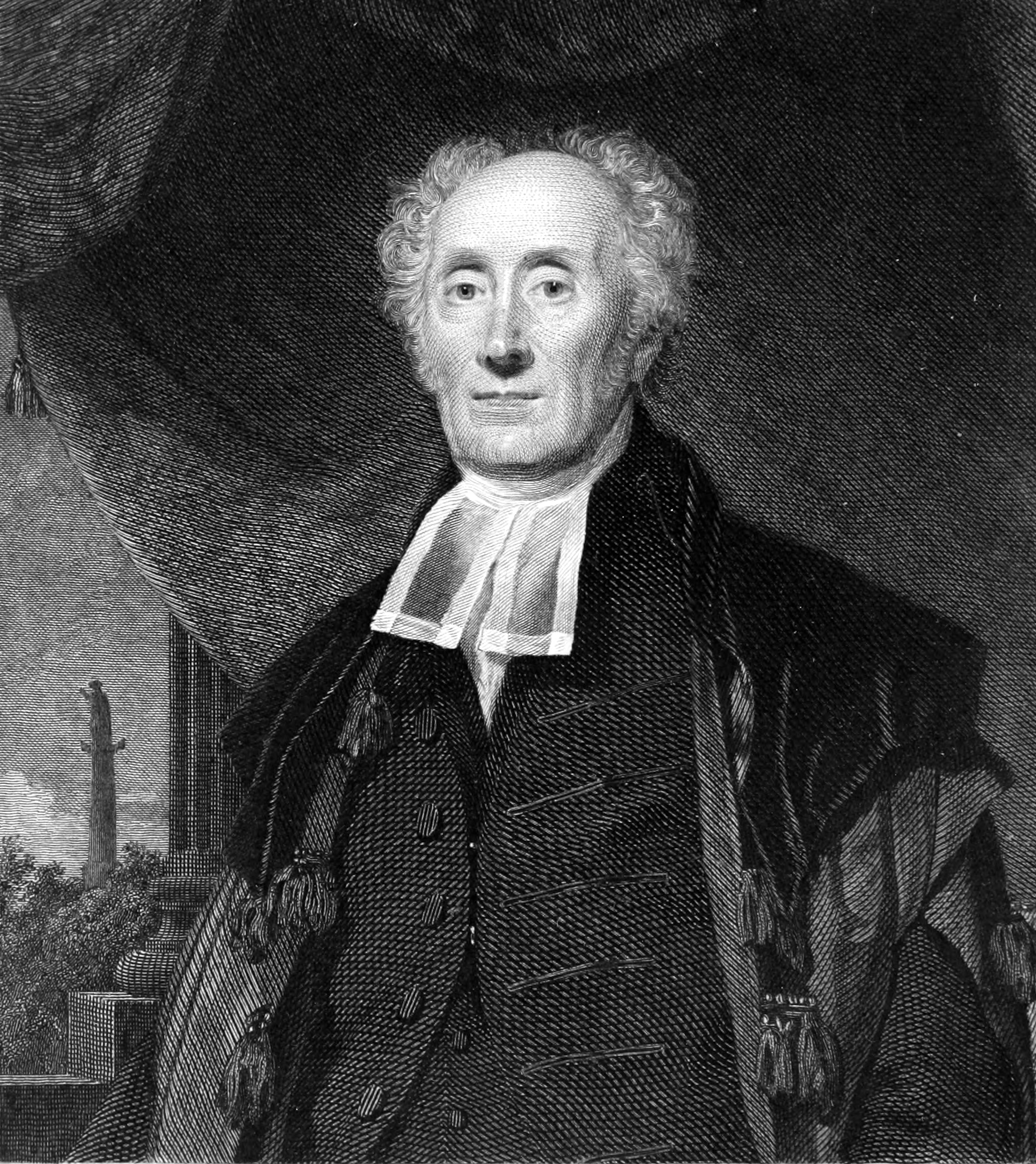
Stevenson MacGill from Burns after John Graham-Gilbert

Stevenson McGill (1765–1840) was a Scottish Presbyterian minister of the Church of Scotland who served as Moderator of the General Assembly of the Church of Scotland in 1828. He was an author and was elected to be a professor of Divinity at Glasgow University.

== Early life and education ==
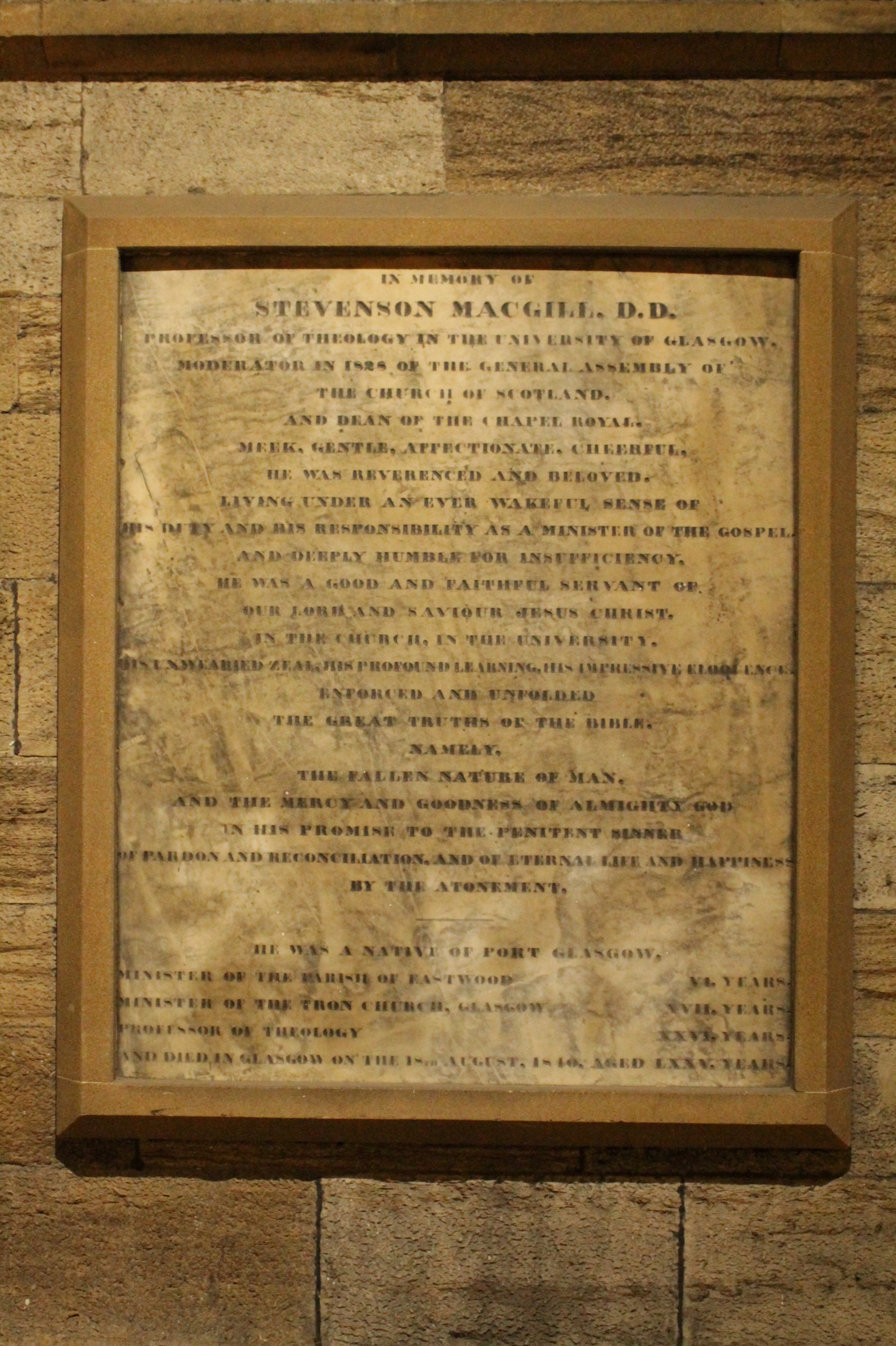
Memorial to Very Rev Stevenson McGill, Glasgow University

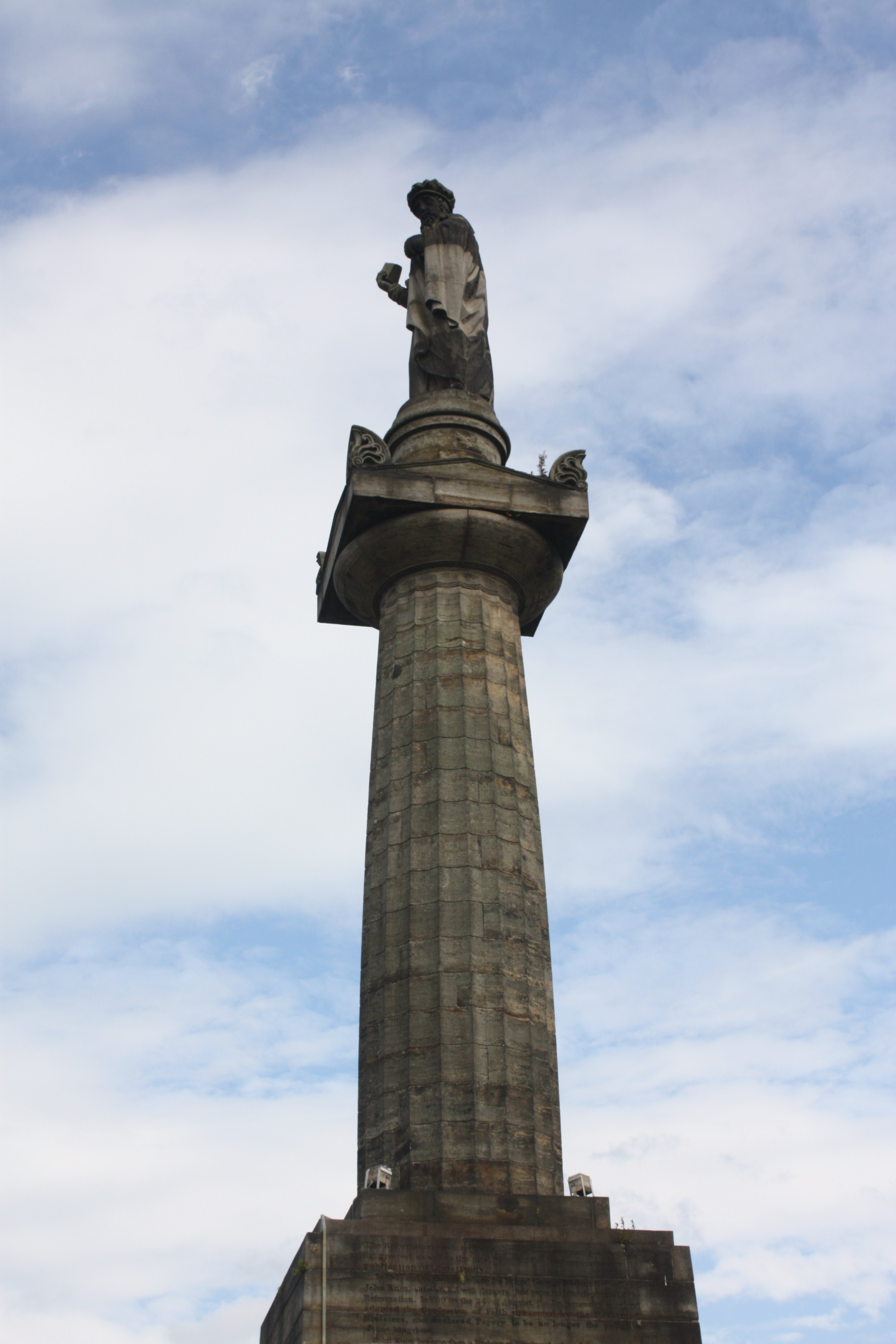
Statue of John Knox at the Glasgow Necropolis

Stevenson was born in Port Glasgow on 19 January 1765 the son of Thomas Macgill, a shipbuilder on the River Clyde. His mother, Frances Welsh, daughter of George Welsh, esq., of Lochharet in East Lothian, may have been a descendant of John Welch, son-in-law of John Knox. Macgill was educated in the parish school at Port Glasgow and Glasgow University, which he entered at the age of ten and took the nine years' course, gaining many distinctions in classics and theology.

== Ministry and early writing ==
After acting as a private tutor to the Earl of Buchan, among others, he was licensed to preach by the Paisley presbytery in 1790, and in the following year was presented to the parish of Eastwood, Renfrewshire where he worked from 1791 to 1797. He also received an offer of the chair of civil history in the united colleges of St. Salvator and St. Leonard at St. Andrews, together with a small country living, but conscientious scruples prevented his accepting any plurality. In 1790 he contributed the ‘Student's Dream’ anonymously to ‘Macnab's Collection,’ and in 1792 published a tract against the French revolution called ‘The Spirit of the Times.’ In 1797 he was translated to the Tron Church, Glasgow, and the ‘dearth’ which occurred soon afterwards gave abundant scope for his parochial energies. On 23 August 1803 he received the degree of D.D. from the university and Marischal College, Aberdeen. He bestowed considerable attention on the prisons, infirmary, and lunatic asylum, and in 1809 published his ‘Thoughts on Prisons,’ advocating extensive reforms, which were not, however, adopted when the Glasgow prison was built. He insisted upon further church accommodation, urging that lack of it encouraged the growth of dissent, and started an association for mutual instruction in literature and theology, before which he read a series of essays, afterwards published as ‘Letters addressed to a Young Clergyman,’ 1809. A second edition, enlarged and dedicated to Hannah More, was issued in 1820.

== University professor ==
In 1814 he was elected to the chair of theology in the university of Glasgow, vacated by the death of Dr. Robert Findlay; he demitted his charge of Tron Church on 9 November 1814, and was succeeded by Thomas Chalmers; and as professor reorganised the study of theology. In 1823 he engaged in a warm dispute with some of his university colleagues, notably Patrick MacFarlan, on the question of pluralities, and his views were subsequently adopted by a royal commission on the Scottish universities.

== Death and legacy ==
In 1825 he began campaigning for a monument to John Knox on Fir Hill adjacent to Glasgow Cathedral. This met with success and is now the centrepiece of the Glasgow Necropolis which grew around it.

In 1828 he succeeded Very Rev Robert Haldane as Moderator of the General Assembly. He in turn was succeeded in 1829 by Patrick Forbes of Old Machar.

In 1834 he succeeded Very Rev John Inglis as dean of the Chapel Royal. He died on 18 August 1840 aged 75.

A memorial tablet to McGill lies in the undercroft section of the University of Glasgow.

== Family ==
In April 1817 he married Margaret Crawford (d.1874), only daughter of Major Moris Crawford (sic) of Newfield HEICS. They had several children.

== Publications ==
- Statistical Account of the Parish of Eastwood (1791)
- The Student's Dream [anonymously] (Macnab's Collection, 1790)
- The Spirit of the Times (Glasgow, 1792)
- Remarks on Prisons (Glasgow, 1809)
- Considerations addressed to a Young Clergyman (Glasgow, 1809, 2nd ed. [as Letters addressed], 1820)
- On Lunatic Asylums (Glasgow, 1810)
- Discourse on Elementary Education (Glasgow, 1811)
- A Collection of Sacred Translations, Paraphrases, and Hymns (Glasgow, 1813)
- Discourses and Essays on Subjects of Public Interest (Edinburgh, 1819)
- On the Connection of Situation with Character (1820)
- A Sermon preached before the S.P.C.K. (Edinburgh, 1824)
- A Sermon preached in behalf of the Church Accommodation Society (Glasgow, 1834)
- Lectures on Rhetoric and Criticism (Edinburgh, 1838, Glasgow, 1852)
- Sermons (portrait) (Glasgow, 1839)
- Discourses [with Memoir] (Glasgow, 1844)
- Evidences of Christianity [Memoir by his brother Francis] (1852)
