= Highbury Fields =

Park in Islington, London

Coordinates: 51°33′1″N 0°6′6″W

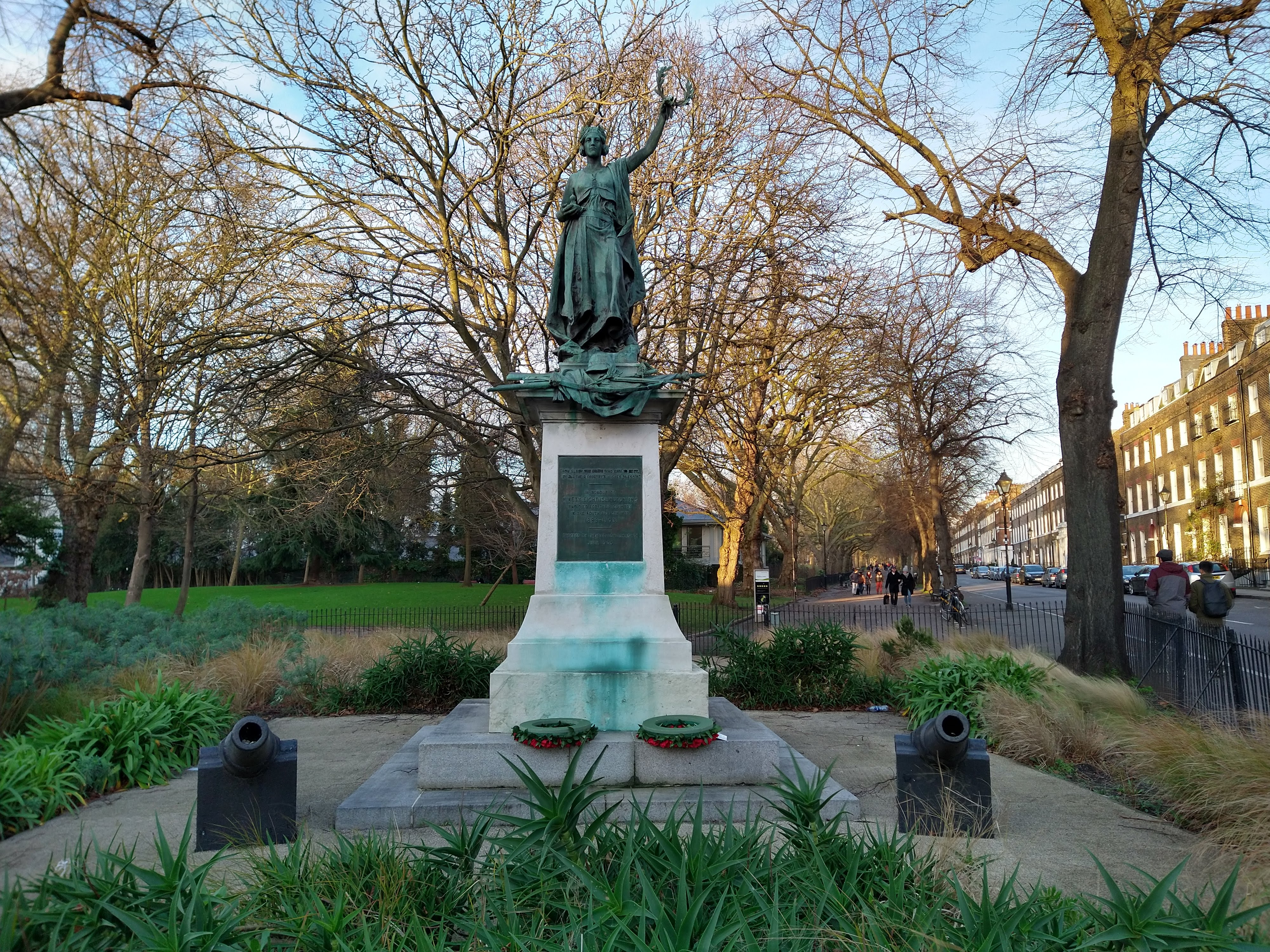
Highbury Fields Boer War memorial

Highbury Fields is an open space in Highbury, in the London Borough of Islington. At 11.75 hectares (29 acres), it is the largest open space in the borough.

It extends north from Highbury Corner almost as far as Highbury Barn. As well as parkland, Highbury Fields contains recreational facilities including tennis courts and Highbury Pool, which reopened after refurbishment in January 2007. The park is a popular thoroughfare for people walking to the nearby Emirates Stadium.

== Georgian and Victorian terraces ==
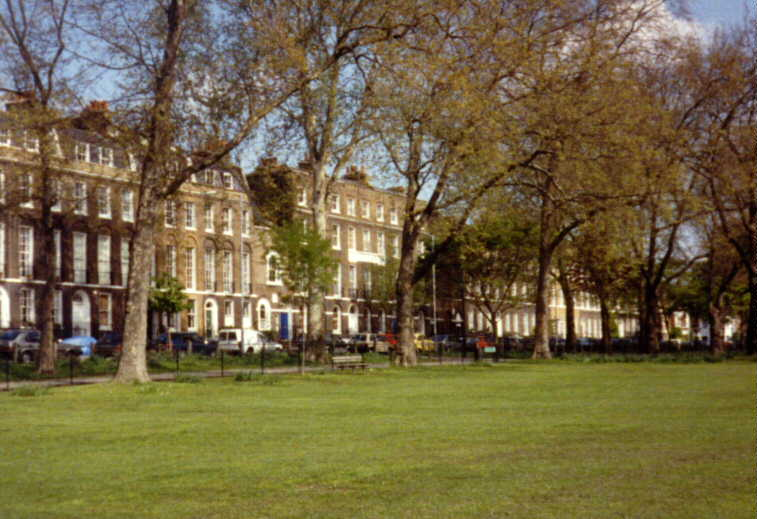
Highbury Terrace

The houses surrounding the Fields are good examples of Georgian and Victorian town houses and are highly desirable residences. These terraces lie on three roads: Highbury Place, Highbury Crescent, and Highbury Terrace.

John Dawes bought much of the demesne and began the residential development of Highbury. He granted leases in 1774-9 for 39 houses on Highbury Place. These were designed and built by John Spiller, a speculative builder of Southwark. The terrace was completed in 1777. Famous residents include:

- 1. Walter Sickert, the Impressionist painter, lived here and ran a school for artists from 1927 to 1931.
- 25. John Wesley stayed here.
- 25. Joseph Chamberlain lived here from 1845 to 1854.
- 39. John Spiller moved in when the terrace was completed in 1777.
- ??. Abraham Newland, chief cashier of the Bank of England, never slept out of the Bank for 25 years. His house on Highbury Place was for daytime use only.

The next major development around what was to become Highbury Fields was the construction of Highbury Terrace. The central part of the terrace dates to 1789. By 1794 nos. 1-16 had been built. Sir Francis Ronalds, lived and worked at number 1 Highbury Terrace between 1796 and 1813.

Highbury Crescent was begun in 1844, when land was laid out for it by James Wagstaff and James Goodbody. Nos. 19-25 were let to Goodbody in 1846. The houses were pairs of large Italianate villas, with rich and varied decorations in stucco.

== War memorial ==
At the south end of the fields stands a war memorial by Bertram Mackennal dating from 1905, featuring a wreath, cannons and the captured standards of defeated enemies. It commemorates Islington residents who fell in the Boer War.

== Nearest station ==
- Highbury and Islington station
