= John MacKay Bernard =

Scottish brewer, philanthropist (1857 – 1919)

John MacKay Bernard of Dunsinnan and Buttergask FRSE (1857 – 19 April 1919) was a Scottish brewer, philanthropist and noted amateur meteorologist. He was President of the Scottish Meteorological Society 1912 to 1915.

== Life ==
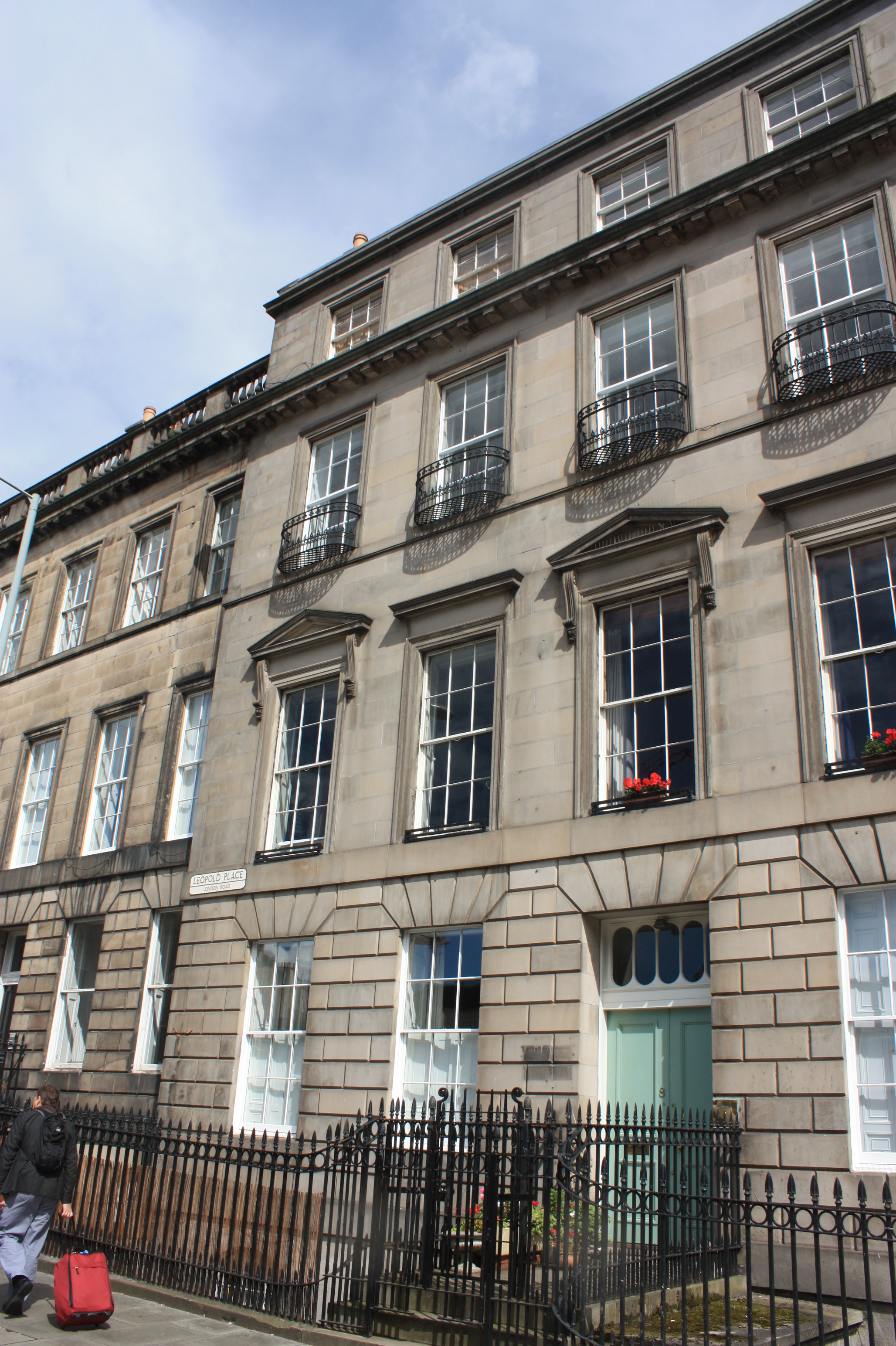
J M Bernard's childhood home at 8 Leopold Place, Edinburgh

He was born the son of Thomas Bernard (d.1874) of the Edinburgh brewing company of Thomas and James Bernard Brewers Ltd. founded in 1840. They operated from 71 North Back in the Canongate. The family lived in a luxurious house at 8 Leopold Place.

On his father’s death in 1874 he inherited the company along with his older brother Daniel. He decided to attend university to better his knowledge and graduated with a BSc from the University of Edinburgh in 1887.

He was elected a Fellow of the Royal Society of Edinburgh in 1887 due to his contributions to meteorology. His proposers were Sir Thomas Jamieson Boyd, Andrew Peebles Aitken, Alexander Crum Brown and David Alan Stevenson. At this time he was living at 25 Chester Street in Edinburgh’s West End.

In 1888 they relocated to Slateford Road to a custom built brewery designed by the Edinburgh architect Hippolyte Blanc in 1887. A dispute with his brother Daniel in 1889 caused Daniel to set up alone in a new brewery at Gorgie. The Slateford premises were then renamed Thomas and James Bernard Brewery Ltd (the original brewery name) in 1895

The company survived until 1960 when it was taken over by Scottish Brewers Ltd.

He owned estates in Perthshire near Dunsinane Hill (Dunsinnan House). His family coat-of-arms was a rampant bear, muzzled.

He died on 19 April 1919. He is buried in Collace churchyard close to his Dunsinnan estate.
