= George Forbes (cashier) =

Chief Cashier of the Bank of England (1825-1874)

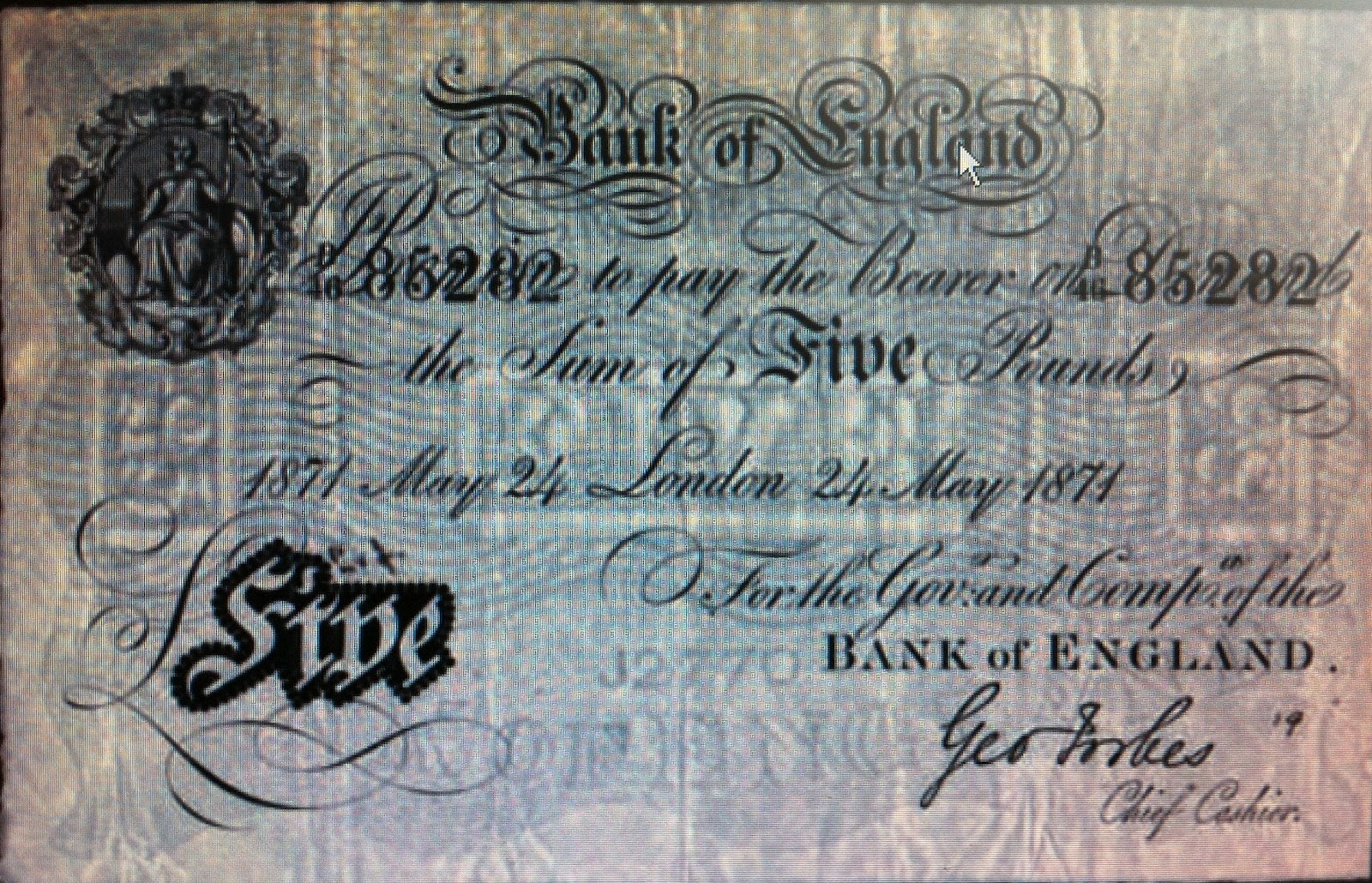
A George Forbes signed Bank of England £5 banknote of 1871.

George Forbes (2 January 1825 – 25 May 1874) was a Scottish banker from Aberdeen who was Chief Cashier of the Bank of England from 1866–73. He resigned his position owing to poor health, after 29 years with the bank. Forbes was replaced as Chief Cashier by Frank May. He died the following year at Mistley Abbey, Manningtree, aged 45. He was the son of Rev. Patrick Forbes.
