= Charles Jewson =

Charles Jewson was the Chief Cashier of the Bank of England from 1775 to 1777. Jewson was replaced as Chief Cashier by Henry Hase.
