= Declaration and forfeiture =

Cricket regulations

In the sport of cricket, a declaration occurs when a captain declares their team's innings closed and a forfeiture occurs when a captain chooses to forfeit an innings without batting. Declaration and forfeiture are covered in Law 15 of the Laws of Cricket. This concept applies only to matches in which each team is scheduled to bat in two innings; Law 15 specifically does not apply in any form of limited overs cricket.

== Declaration ==
The captain of the batting side may declare an innings closed, when the ball is dead, at any time during a match. Usually this is because the captain thinks their team has already scored enough runs to win the match and does not wish to consume any further time batting which would make it easier for the opponents to play out for a draw. Tactical declarations are sometimes used in other circumstances.

In May 1889, the laws of cricket were revised to allow for declarations but on condition they only took place on the final day of the match. The first captain to declare in English first-class cricket was Charles Wright in 1890. In a game against Kent at the Bat and Ball Ground in Gravesend, Wright declared Nottinghamshire's second innings closed on 157 for 5 to set Kent a target of 231 to win. The tactic nearly paid off as the game was drawn with Kent on 98 for 9 and Nottinghamshire requiring one more wicket to win.

Frank May proposed at the Annual General Meeting of the Marylebone Cricket Club on 2 May 1906 that in a two-day match, the captain of the batting side has power to declare their innings closed at any time, but such declaration may not be made on the first day later than one hour and forty minutes before the hour of drawing stumps. After some discussion the resolution was passed.

Law 15 has no exclusions to prevent declarations or forfeiture during limited overs cricket, and as such tournaments will add bans and limitation through match condition regulations. The Worcestershire v Somerset, 1979 match was an example of a limited overs match having a declaration, caused by the league tiebreaker making it a strategic positive for Somerset to declare after scoring 1 run even though it would lead to defeat.

Before declarations were made legal the batsmen of a team that wanted to get the other team to bat again would have to deliberately get themselves out. There have been examples of teams circumventing match conditions that ban declaration within a limited overs match by having their batters elect to be dismissed retired out. An ICC Women's T20 World Cup Asia Region Qualifier between the UAE and Qatar saw the UAE score 192 runs in 16 overs with their opening partnership and then retire 10 batters to end the innings early due to the threat of rain that could prevent Qatar from completing the 5 over minimum for the Duckworth–Lewis–Stern method to be applied to find a result. Qatar were then dismissed for 29 runs off 11 overs and 1 ball.

=== Tactical considerations ===
The basic tactical idea of declaration is that a team declares because they feel they have enough runs to produce a positive result in the current match situation. The specifics of when to declare will come down to which innings of the match is being played, the time when the declaration occurs and how much of the match is left to play. A common example of timing a declaration is when the declaration comes near the end of play for the day. A team who have batted through the day may decide that the extra runs on offer are worth less than the opportunity to bowl at a team who are tired from standing in the field all day.

A team in the first of the four innings can have to make a tactical choice between continuing to bat in their first innings and declaring. The existence of the follow-on law makes amassing a very large lead worthwhile as it can prevent the game from being lost due to how long it would take a team to equalise the scores even if they avoid being bowled out. Declaring with a large total and many wickets in hand can be a choice that backfires if the team batting second go on to make their own very large total. A significant amount of the highest innings totals in Test cricket have come from the team batting second and some have gone on to win those games.

Weather conditions can also make a team decide to declare. If rain may put an end to a match prematurely and there is an incentive to produce a result it may make a team declare on what would normally be a low total as they try to win the shortened match. The Sticky wicket that existed before covered pitches could induce very low total declarations. In the First Test of the 1950–51 Ashes series. As recorded in The Ashes' Strangest Moments, as the pitch at the Gabba began to dry, England declared their first innings at just 68/7, in order to exploit the conditions. Australia were even more extreme, declaring at 32/7. "...the ball proceeded to perform capers all against the laws of gravitation, and there came the craziest day's cricket imaginable, with twenty wickets falling for 130 runs and two declarations that must surely be unique in the annals of Test cricket."

A team batting in the 3rd innings of the match can declare in order to attempt to bowl out their opponents in a short amount of time rather than allowing the game to meander to a draw. In their 1984 tour of Sri Lanka, New Zealand beat the hosts by declaring to set a target of 263 runs shortly after lunch on day 5. Arjuna Ranatunga scored 51 but the rest of the team collapsed around him and shortly after his caught & bowled exit off John Bracewell it was Stephen Boock who took the final wicket with Sri Lanka on 97 from 28 overs. In games where innings have taken a significant amount of time, or where weather has delayed play, many competitions include in their match playing conditions the ability for both captains to decide on a "draw by agreement", commonly allowed once the final hour of the match starts, or 70 minutes when the batting side declares.

The fact that a team ends their innings and gives up the chance to score more runs can make declarations a bad decision in hindsight. In the 2nd Test of the 2012–13 Border–Gavaskar Trophy the Australian side declared so they could bowl at India for 3 overs at the end of the first day rather than see if their final pair of batsmen could score additional runs. India went on to score 503 in their only innings of the game as Australia collapsed all out for 131 in their 2nd innings, losing the game by an innings & 135 runs.

In 2017 England declared while hosting the West Indies in the 2nd test, at 490/8d in their 2nd innings. This left the West Indies a target of 322 to win from 96 overs. The opening batters navigated the 6 over spell before stumps and on the final day Kraigg Brathwaite scored 95 & Shai Hope 118 not out to give his side an unlikely 5 wicket win 6 overs before the close of play.

During the English tour of South Africa in 1948/49, the 5th test ended with an English victory. South Africa declared on 187/3 to give England a target of 172. The English achieved that figure in their 24th over for the loss of 7 wickets. Jack Crapp hit 10 runs off 3 balls to secure the win which came one minute before the 4 day game was due to finish.

There have been occasions where a team have declared in both their innings and lost. South Africa faced Australia in Sydney in 2006, South Africa scored 451/9d and 194/6d. Australia scored 359 in their first innings and were set 287 runs for victory in their second. Matthew Hayden & Ricky Ponting put up a 150 run partnership for the 3rd wicket then Ponting & Brad Hodge secured the win in the 61st over as Ponting finished not out on 143. In 1968 Garry Sobers and his West Indian team declared on 526/7 and 92/2 to set England 215 to win in 3 hours in the hope of winning the game by inducing an English batting collapse as they chased more than 4 runs an over. The English won the match reaching the target with 7 wickets & 3 minutes to spare, led by half-centuries to Geoffrey Boycott and Colin Cowdrey.

== Forfeiture ==
Under the current Laws, a captain may forfeit either of their side's innings. A forfeited innings shall be considered as a completed innings. Usually this happens in shorter competitive two-innings matches, where captains need to agree with each other how to set up the match so that there is a reasonable chance of a result. For example, after one team's first innings has been completed or declared, that team's second innings and the other team's first innings may be forfeited. This leaves the other team to bat in its second innings with a target to win the match. Winning a game gains a team considerably more points than drawing it, so captains are often willing to risk giving the opposition an opportunity to win that they otherwise would not have had as long as they are getting a similar opportunity in return.

In August 2020, in a rain-affected match between Durham and Leicestershire in the 2020 Bob Willis Trophy, both teams agreed to forfeit an innings in an attempt to produce a result.

A forfeiture occurred in an August 2026 County Championship Division Two four-day game between Derbyshire and Middlesex. Derbyshire's first innings took until the 4th day to complete after the 1st day was washed out, the 2nd was limited to only 32.3 overs and the 3rd also had no play. Derbyshire were bowled out for 131 in 49.1 overs, after which Middlesex forfeited their innings in the hope of quickly bowling out Derbyshire and chasing a low total in the final innings. Derbyshire's batting was better in the second attempt and they made it to the afternoon tea break on 108 for the loss of 3 wickets. Only three more overs, and 3 more runs, came after the tea break when bad light ended the match in a draw. Although both teams needed to win to get closer to the top of the league ladder, this forfeiture was not made as part of an agreement between the two teams.

=== Test cricket ===
Only one innings has been voluntarily forfeited in Test cricket. This was on 18 January 2000 at Centurion, South Africa, in the fifth and final Test between South Africa and England. South Africa had already won the series, as they were up 2–0 (with 2 matches drawn) after the first four matches. After South Africa scored 155 for 6 on the first day, rain washed out the next three days. With only one day remaining, the match was set for a certain draw.

That was until Hansie Cronje, the South African captain, entered into a deal with his English counterpart, Nasser Hussain, that South Africa would continue batting till they reached about 250 and then declare. England and then South Africa would then both forfeit an innings, leaving England approximately 250 to win (in the event the target was 249). At that time, the laws only permitted a side to forfeit its second innings, so England's first innings was treated as having been declared at 0 for 0 after 0 balls. England went on to score 251 for 8 and win by 2 wickets.

It later emerged that Cronje had been approached by a bookmaker, and asked to ensure the game would end with a positive result. Nasser Hussain and the England team were not aware of this at the time, taking the South African request at face value.
