= Charles Harvey (cricketer) =

English cricketer

Personal information
- Full name: Charles Musgrave Harvey
- Born: 11 May 1837; Hornsey, Middlesex, England
- Died: 2 November 1917 (aged 80); Ealing, Middlesex, England
- Batting: Unknown

Domestic team information
- Years: Team
- 1858: Oxford University
- 1859: Marylebone Cricket Club
- 1859: Middlesex

Career statistics
Competition	First-class
Matches	5
Runs scored	111
Batting average	15.85
100s/50s	–/–
Top score	36
Catches/stumpings	3/–
- Source: Cricinfo, 5 May 2020

Charles Musgrave Harvey (11 May 1837 – 2 November 1917) was an English first-class cricketer and clergyman.

The son of Rev. Richard Harvey, he was born at Hornsey in May 1837. He was educated at Charterhouse School, before going up to Christ Church, Oxford in 1855, graduating B.A. 1859 (M.A. 1862).

While studying at Oxford, he made a single appearance in first-class cricket for Oxford University against the Marylebone Cricket Club (MCC) at Oxford in 1858. The following year, he made one first-class appearance apiece for the MCC against Oxford University, and for Middlesex against Kent. He made two further first-class appearances for the Gentlemen of the South against the Gentlemen of the North in 1860. In five first-class matches, he scored 111 runs at an average of 15.85 and with a high score of 36.

After graduating from Oxford, Harvey took holy orders in the Church of England. His first ecclesiastical post was at Halstead, where he curate from 1860 to 1863. He was appointed curate at Hampstead in 1864, a post he held until 1869. He was rector of St Mary's Church, Acton 1869–1896, then vicar at Hillingdon 1896–1916, and was a prebendary of St Paul's Cathedral. Harvey died at Ealing in November 1917.

== Family ==
Harvey married Frances Harriet Brewster on 13 August 1863. They had eight children:

- Richard Charles Musgrave Harvey (1864–1944), Archdeacon of Huddersfield then Halifax
- Sir John Musgrave Harvey (1865–1940), judge of the Supreme Court of New South Wales
- Sir Ernest Musgrave Harvey (1867–1955), Chief Cashier and Deputy Governor of the Bank of England
- Mary Frances Musgrave Harvey (1869–1959), married Rev. Charles James Sharp (parents of Evelyn, Lady Sharp)
- Ethel Musgrave Harvey (1871–1958)
- Bernard Musgrave Harvey (1872–1897)
- Dorothy Harvey (1874–1924)
- Margery Musgrave Harvey (1878–1974), married Rev. Aubrey Baskerville Mynors (parents of Sir R. A. B. Mynors and Sir Humphrey Mynors)
