= Thomas Rippon (cashier) =

Chief Cashier of the Bank of England (1760-1835)

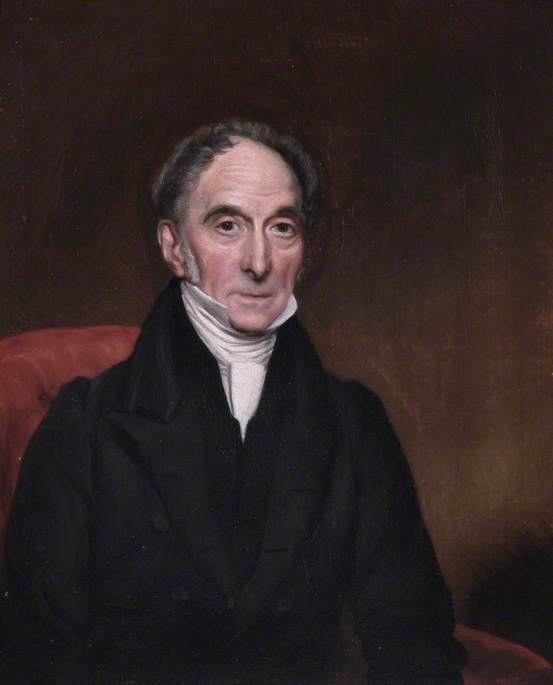
Thomas Rippon by an unknown artist, Bank of England Museum, London.

Thomas Rippon (1760–1835) was the Chief Cashier of the Bank of England from 1829 to 1835. Rippon was replaced as Chief Cashier by Matthew Marshall.

Born at Tiverton, Devon, Thomas Rippon was the younger brother of John Rippon, the Baptist minister and hymnologist in Southwark. Thomas Rippon was trained under Abraham Newland and eventually succeeded him as the chief cashier.

Regarding his character and professionalism, it was said that he "furnishes an extraordinary instance of the manner in which the mind becomes warped by continued and very close application to business. He always declared he felt himself no where so happy as in his business; and, though for upwards of fifty years in the Bank, he never solicited but one holyday, which being granted, he left London with the intention of being absent a fortnight; but the ennui of an idle life, and the want of his usual occupation, so preyed upon his spirits, that he actually returned to the Bank at expiration of three days, stating that green fields and country scenery had no charms for him. Mr. Rippon was always remarkable for his sound judgment, preciseness, and extreme punctuality, and his long services and habits of economy, enabled him to leave behind him a fortune of 60,000l."
