= John Fforde =

British economist

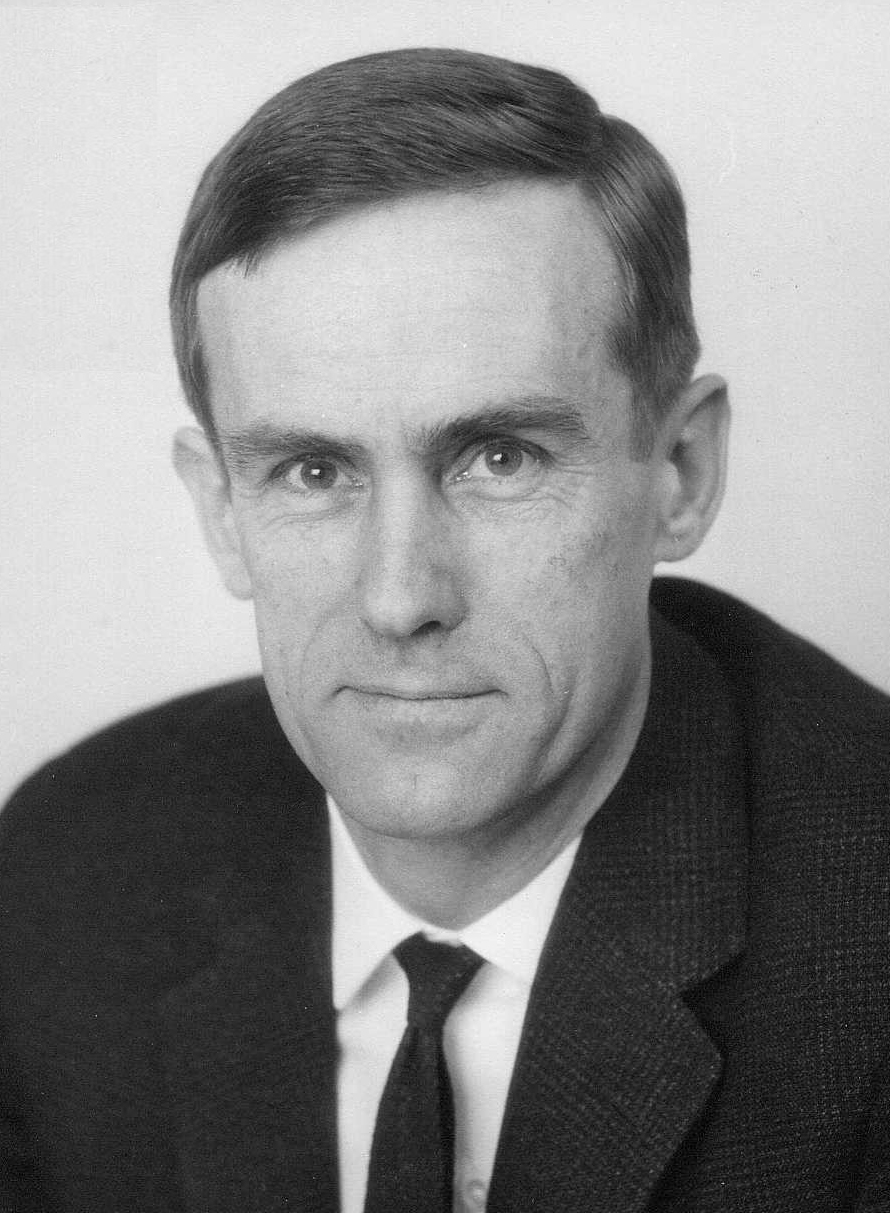
- John Standish Fforde, C.1972
- Born: 16 November 1921 Broadstone, Dorset, United Kingdom
- Died: 10 April 2000 (aged 78) Hereford, United Kingdom
- Occupation: Economist

John Standish Fforde (16 November 1921 – 10 April 2000) was a British economist who was active in the Bank of England between 1957 and 1984. As Chief Cashier between 1966 and 1970, his signature appeared on British banknotes. After retirement, he became the Bank of England's official historian, and wrote The Bank of England and Public Policy, which covered the years 1941 to 1958.

== Early life and education ==
Fforde was born at Broadstone, Dorset, fourth of five children of farmer and civil engineer Francis Creswell Fforde (1873–1949), of Lurgan, County Armagh, Ireland, and his first wife, Agnes Cecily. He was educated at Rossall School before going up to Christ Church, Oxford. Volunteering for war service in 1940, he joined the RAF and from 1941 to 1943 was based in Canada as a flying instructor for the British Commonwealth Air Training Plan and in 1943 converted on to heavy bombers to fly the Consolidated B-24 Liberator and was posted to No. 358 Squadron RAF for the South East Asia Command based out of Jessore. Returning to Oxford post-war, he took first-class honours in philosophy, politics and economics in 1949, subsequently taking the promotion to MA, having spent the requisite time as a member of the university.

== Career ==
=== Posts held ===
- Prime Minister's Statistical Branch 1951–1953
- Fellow, Nuffield College, Oxford 1953–1956
- Staff, Bank of England 1957–1984
- Deputy Chief, Central Banking Information Department 1959–1964
- Adviser to the Governors 1964–1966, 1982–1984
- Chief Cashier 1966–1970
- Executive Director (Home Finance) 1970–1982
- Official historian to the Bank of England, 1984–1992

=== Publications ===
- The Federal Reserve System, 1945–49 (1953)

Fforde's work Bank of England's History: The Bank of England And Public Policy (1941–1958) was published in 1992.

== Personal life ==
In 1951, Fforde married Marya Retinger, the daughter of Austro-Hungarian (later, Polish) political adviser Joseph Retinger, and a granddaughter of journalist E. D. Morel. They have three sons and one daughter, including novelist Jasper Fforde.
