= Malcolm Gill =

George Malcolm Gill (born 23 May 1934) was Chief Cashier of the Bank of England from 1988 to 1991. The signature of the Chief Cashier appears on British banknotes. Gill was replaced as Chief Cashier by Graham Kentfield. He was one of the shortest serving Chief Cashiers and during Gill's tenancy, two different £5 notes were issued with his signature.

Gill joined the Bank of England in 1957 after completing his National Service. From 1966 to 1968, he was part of the UK delegation to the International Monetary Fund in Washington and in 1972 he was secretary to the bank's governor, Lord O'Brien of Lothbury. In 1977, he was seconded to the Treasury and in 1982 he was made head of the Foreign Exchange Division. He joined the Bank for International Settlements in 1991 and retired in 1999.
