= Kenneth Peppiatt =

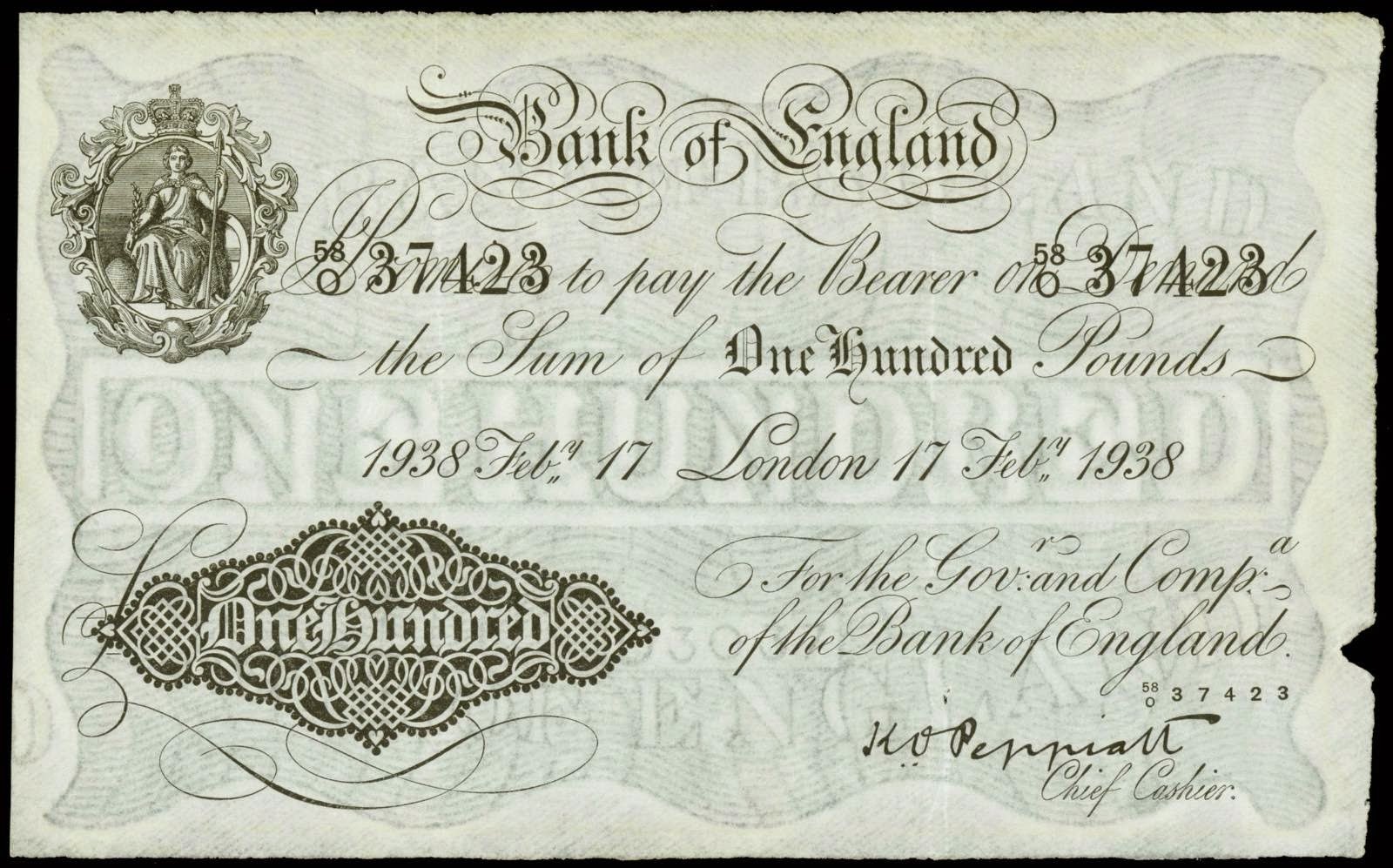
A Peppiatt signed £100 note of 1938.

Major Sir Kenneth Oswald Peppiatt KBE, MC and Bar, (25 March 1893 – 12 May 1983) was the Chief Cashier of the Bank of England from 1934 to 1949. Peppiatt was replaced as Chief Cashier by Percival Beale.

Kenneth Peppiatt attended Bancroft's School and served with the 1/7th and later 2/7th Battalions of the 7th (City of London) Battalion, London Regiment during World War I and was second-in-command of the battalion in 1920. https://kclpure.kcl.ac.uk/ws/portalfiles/portal/2934144/DX189050.pdf
