= Robert Haldane (mathematician) =

British mathematician and minister (1772–1854)

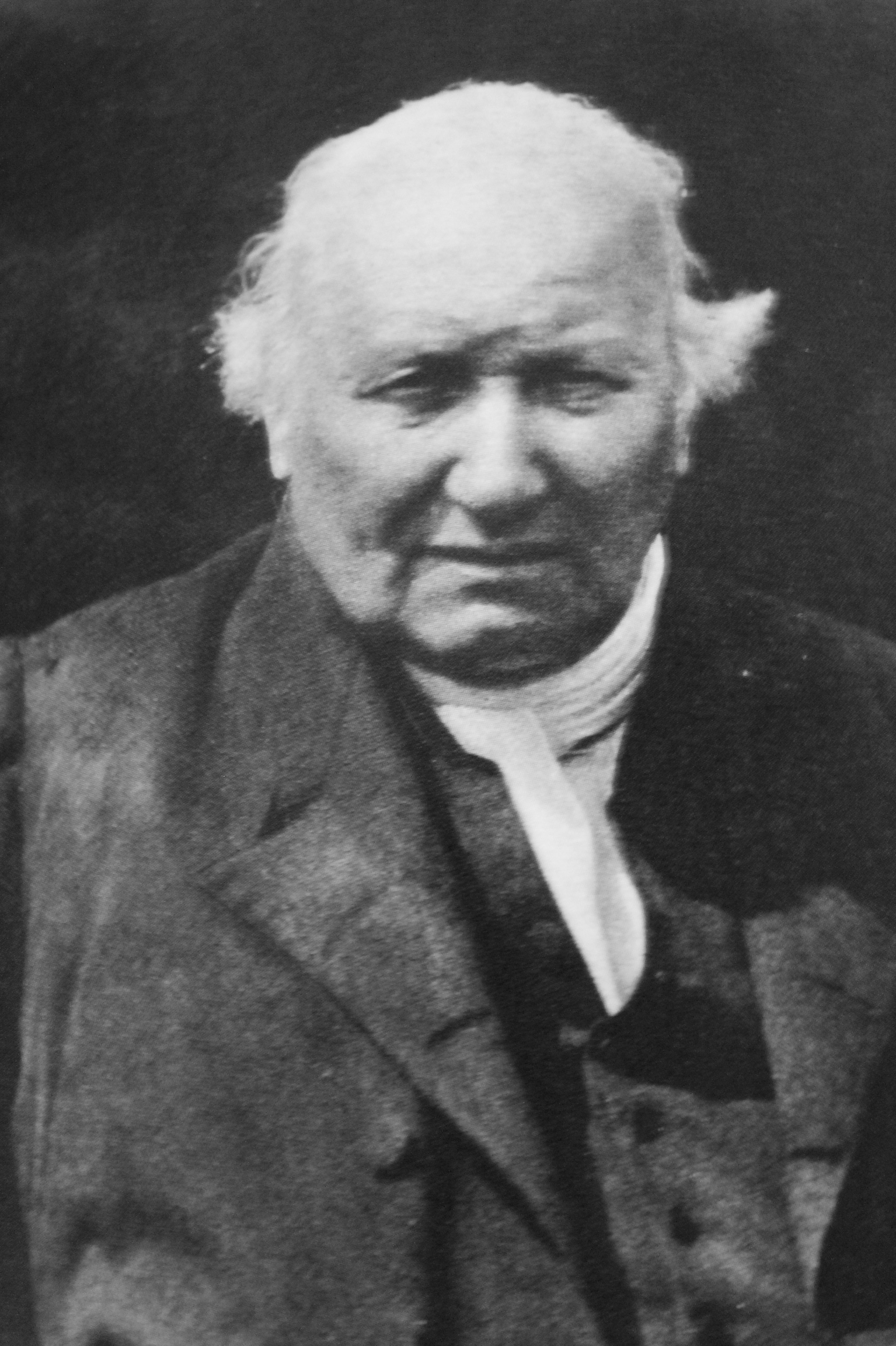
- Born: 27 January 1772; Perthshire, Scotland
- Died: 9 March 1854 (aged 82); St Andrews, Scotland
- Education: Glasgow University
- Scientific career
- Fields: Mathematics
- Workplaces: University of St Andrews

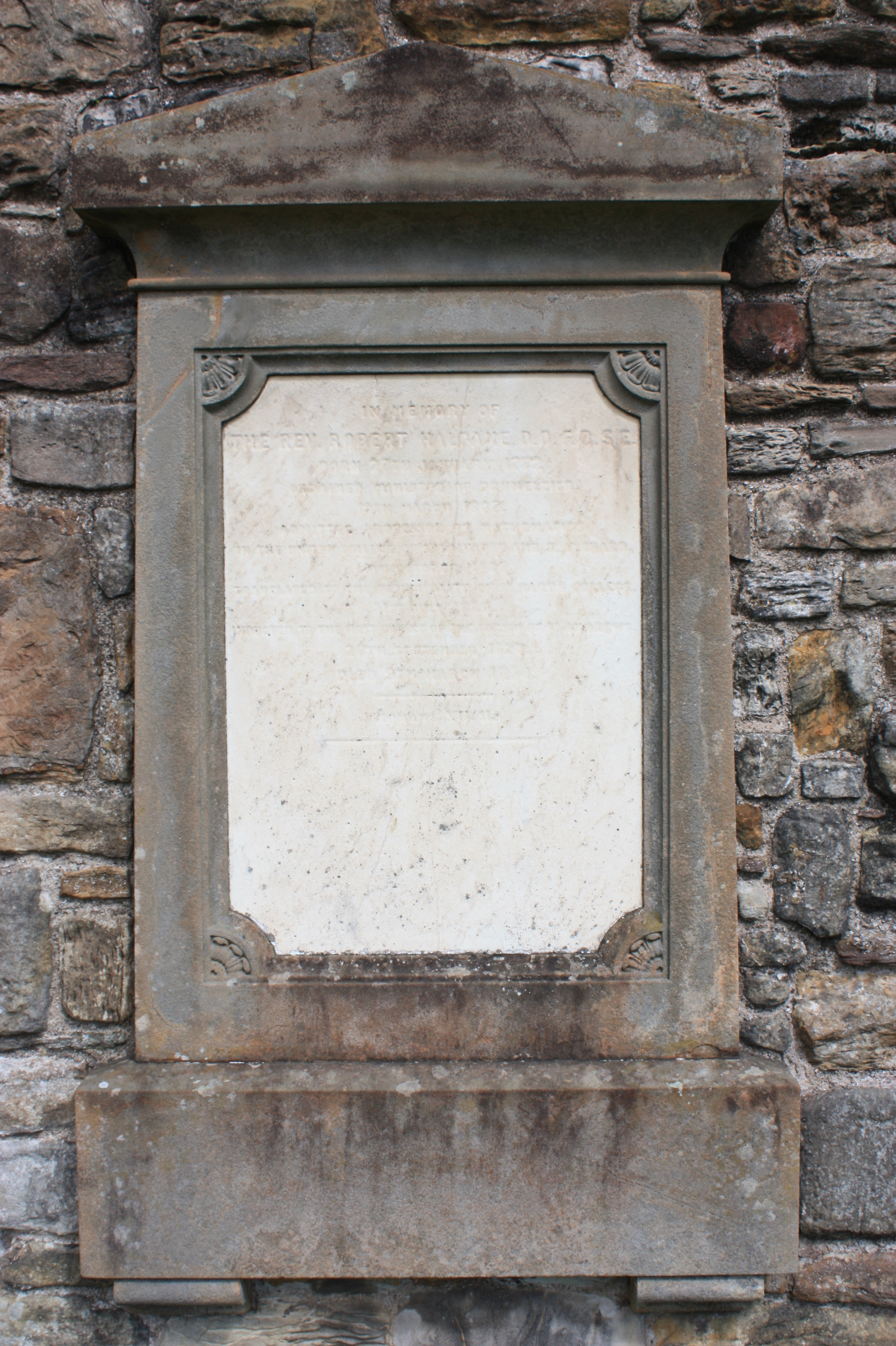
The grave of Robert Haldane, St Andrews Cathedral churchyard

Robert Haldane FRSE (27 January 1772 – 9 March 1854) was a British mathematician and minister of the Church of Scotland.

== Biography ==
Haldane was born on 27 January 1772, in Perthshire, the son of a farmer at Overtown, Lecropt, on the borders of Perthshire and Stirlingshire; and was named after Robert Haldane, then proprietor of Airthrey Castle. He was educated at the school in Dunblane, and then at Glasgow University.

Haldane became a private tutor, first in the family at Leddriegreen, Strathblane, and later with Charles Moray of Abercairnie. On 5 December 1797, he was licensed as a preacher by the presbytery of Auchterarder, but he did not obtain a charge quickly. In August 1806, he was presented to the church of Drummelzier, in the presbytery of Peebles, and was ordained on 19 March 1807.

When the chair of mathematics became vacant in the University of St. Andrews in 1807, Haldane was appointed to the professorship, and resigned his charge at Drummelzier on 2 October 1809. He remained in the post until 1820, when he was promoted by the crown to the pastoral charge of St. Andrews parish, vacant by the death of Principal George Hill. His predecessor had held the principalship of St. Mary's College in St. Andrews in conjunction with his ministerial office, and the same arrangement was followed in the case of Haldane, who was admitted on 28 September 1820. As principal he was ex officio primarius professor of divinity.

On 17 May 1827, Haldane was elected Moderator of the General Assembly of the Church of Scotland. At the time of the disruption of 1843 Haldane was called to the chair ad interim. He was elected a Fellow of the Royal Society of Edinburgh in 1820, his proposers being George Dunbar, Robert Jameson, Alexander Brunton and Patrick Neill. In 1828, his role as Moderator was succeeded by Rev Stevenson McGill.

He died at St Mary's College, St Andrews, on 9 March 1854, in his eighty-third year, and was buried in the cathedral cemetery there. The grave lies on the north wall just left of the distinctive white military memorial to Lt Col Sir Hugh Lyon Playfair. Haldane's marble inscription is badly eroded.

His portrait was in the hall of the university library at St. Andrews. He was succeeded by John Tulloch.

Haldane's only publication was a small work relating to the condition of the poor in St. Andrews (Cupar, 1841).

== Notes ==
Attribution

This article incorporates text from a publication now in the public domain: Stephen, Leslie; Lee, Sidney, eds. (1890). "Haldane, Robert (1772-1854)". Dictionary of National Biography. Vol. 24. London: Smith, Elder & Co.
