= Collace =

Parish in Perthshire, Scotland

Coordinates: 56.4770°N 3.2930°W

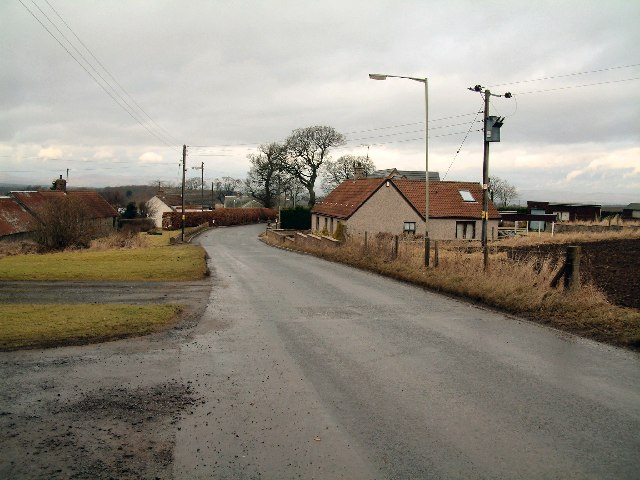
Collace village

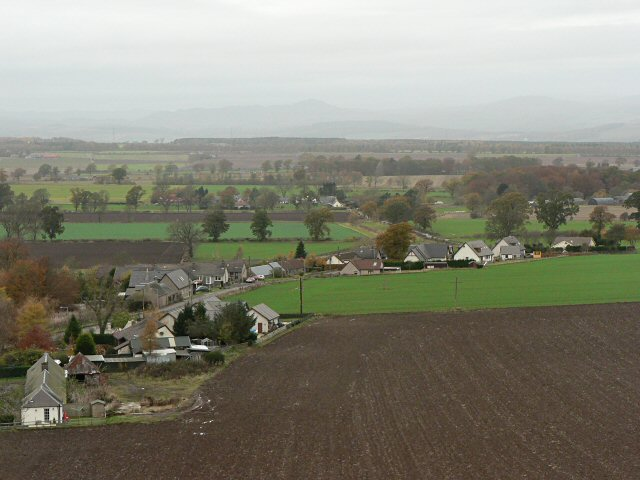
Collace from the path to Dunsinane Hill

Collace (/kəˈleɪs/) is a parish in Perthshire, Scotland, 8 miles (13 kilometres) northeast of Perth, in Strathmore. The parish boundary includes the neighbouring villages of Kinrossie and Saucher.

The traditional industries of the area are farming, quarrying (sandstone) and weaving, but the latter is now gone.

Dunsinane Hill, mentioned in the Shakespeare play Macbeth, is located near Collace. King's Seat, a low hill east of the village, is marked romantically on older maps as "Macbeth's Castle".

Bandirran Stone Circle stands just south of the village.

== Buildings ==
The current Collace parish church building dates from 1812 to 1813 and is on the site of an earlier church dedicated in 1242. Four stained glass windows from 1919 depict scenes from the life of Christ. In the graveyard are important 17th- and 18th-century gravestones, a rare medieval Discoid stone and a conserved mort-house. Next to the church are the remains of a medieval building with a Romanesque arch which was used as the mausoleum for the Nairne family. The chief mansion house is Dunsinnan House, former seat of the extinct Nairne of Dunsinnan baronetcy. An example of a 19th-century morthouse is located in the churchyard.

== Notable residents ==
- William Nairne, Lord Dunsinane (1731–1811) lived in Dunsinnan House
- John MacKay Bernard FRSE (1857–1918) brewer, philanthropist and meteorologist lived in Dunsinnan House and is buried in Collace churchyard.
