= Percival Beale =

Bank of England cashier (1906–1981)

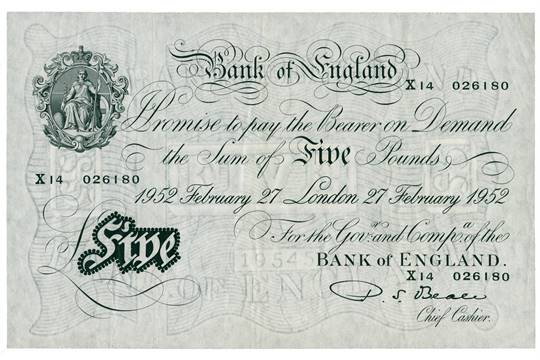
A Percival Beale signed Bank of England £5 note of 1952.

Percival Spencer Beale (14 September 1906 – 4 February 1981) was the 21st Chief Cashier of the Bank of England from 1 March 1949 to 16 January 1955.

Beale was born on 14 September 1906 and entered Bank service on 27 October 1924. He was succeeded as Chief Cashier by Leslie O'Brien.

Beale died on 4 February 1981.
