= Henry Hase (cashier) =

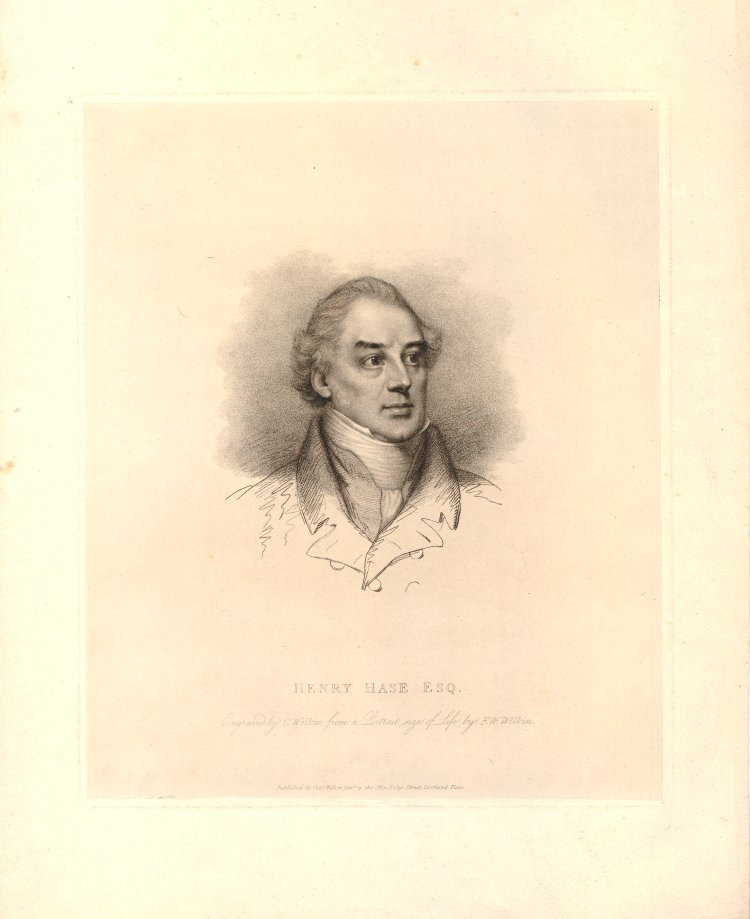
Henry Hase Esq. Stipple engraving by and published by Charles Wilkin after Francis William Wilkin, 1821.

Henry Hase (1763 – 26 March 1829) was the Chief Cashier of the Bank of England from 1807 to 1829. Hase was known as "the reluctant cashier" and appointed after Robert Aslett was discovered to have embezzled £500,000. Hase was replaced as Chief Cashier by Thomas Rippon.
