= Richard Kentfield =

English cricketer (1862–1904)

Personal information
- Full name: Richard William Kentfield
- Born: 25 May 1862; Bognor, Sussex, England
- Died: 16 October 1904 (aged 42); Bedford, Bedfordshire, England
- Batting: Unknown
- Bowling: Left-arm medium

Domestic team information
- Years: Team
- 1894–1896: Sussex
- 1888: Lancashire

Career statistics
| Competition | First-class |
|---|---|
| Matches | 4 |
| Runs scored | 49 |
| Batting average | 6.12 |
| 100s/50s | –/– |
| Top score | 18 |
| Balls bowled | 552 |
| Wickets | 10 |
| Bowling average | 23.20 |
| 5 wickets in innings | 1 |
| 10 wickets in match | – |
| Best bowling | 6/45 |
| Catches/stumpings | –/– |
- Source: Cricinfo, 14 March 2012

Richard William Kentfield (25 May 1862 – 16 October 1904) was an English cricketer. Kentfield's batting and style is unknown, though it is known he bowled left-arm medium pace. He was born at Bognor, Sussex.

Kentfield made his debut in first-class cricket for Lancashire in 1888, making two appearances against Oxford University and Yorkshire. He scored a total of 39 runs in his two matches, which came at an average 9.75, with a high score of 18. With the ball, he took 2 wickets for Lancashire, which came at a bowling average of 47.00, with best figures of 2/52. He returned south in 1889, standing as an umpire in the first-class North v South fixture at Priory Park, Chichester, in 1889. He later made two further first-class appearances for his native Sussex, against Middlesex in the 1894 County Championship, and Lancashire in the 1896 County Championship. He scored just 10 runs in these two matches, though was more successful with the ball, taking 8 wickets at an average of 17.25, with best figures of 6/45. These figures came in the match against Middlesex.

His body was found in the River Great Ouse at Bedford, Bedfordshire, on 16 October 1904.
