= Merlyn Lowther =

Merlyn Vivienne Lowther
- Born: 3 March 1954 (age 72)

Merlyn Vivienne Lowther (born March 1954) was Chief Cashier of the Bank of England from 1999 to 2003. She was the first woman to hold the post. The signature of the Chief Cashier appears on Bank of England banknotes. Lowther was succeeded by Andrew Bailey.

Since February 2013, Lowther has been a deputy chairman of Co-operative Banking Group Limited and the Co-operative Bank plc.

== Biography ==
Merlyn Vivienne Lowther was educated at Manchester High School for Girls and went onto graduate with first-class honours in mathematics in 1975 at University of Manchester. She went on to gain an MSc degree in economics from the London Business School in 1981. Lowther joined the bank direct from university as analyst in the Economics Division. Over fifteen years, she worked within Money Market Operations, Foreign Exchange and the Gilt Edged Division. Lowther was the first woman in the Bank's 300-year history to hold the position of Chief Cashier and a Deputy Director. She retired on 31 December 2003.
