= Lucy Peppiatt =

British theologian and author

Lucy Peppiatt (born 1965) is a British theologian and author who is President of Westminster Theological Centre. Peppiatt was appointed as Dean of Studies in 2012, in 2013 was appointed Principal, and became President in 2025. Since then she has re-established WTC as one of the leading independent, interdenominational, charismatic, theological colleges. She and her husband, Nick Crawley, founded Crossnet Church in 2004. She is now the chair of Crossnet Trust, which comprises a network of small community churches.

== Early life and education ==
Peppiatt was born in 1965 in London, England. As a teenager she lived in Larchmont, NY, and attended Mamaroneck High School between 1979-1981, and then Malborough College, Wiltshire, between 1981-1983.

Peppiatt has a bachelor degree in English Literature from the University of Birmingham (1987), and a Bachelor of Divinity degree from the University of London (2003). She completed an MA in Systematic Theology from King's College London in 2005. In 2011, she was awarded a PhD from the University of Otago in New Zealand, with a thesis titled Spirit Christology and Mission supervised by Prof. Murray Rae.

== Career ==
From 1987-1990, Peppiatt worked with the homeless at The Passage day centre in London

Peppiatt was a licensed lay minister in the Church of England from 1995-2003. She pastored churches alongside her husband at St Stephen's, East Twickenham, St Mary Magdalene Avondale Church, Harare, Zimbabwe and St Stephen's Netherthorpe, Sheffield. She identifies as an evangelical charismatic. She is now chair of Crossnet Trust, Bristol since Crossnet was established as an independent CIO from 2023. She was a Member of Theological Advisory Group to Evangelical Alliance UK from 2014 – 2019 and Vice-Chair from 2017-2019.

Peppiatt was appointed in 2010 to the position of lecturer in systematic theology at WTC (Westminster Theological Centre), a non-denominational Hub-based theological college with its central office based in Cheltenham, Gloucestershire. She became dean of studies in 2011 and has been the principal of WTC since 2013. Under Peppiatt’s leadership the college has been reoriented to serve, primarily, the independent church constituency in the UK who have no dedicated theological colleges. She lectures in systematic theology.

Peppiatt's research interests include the Trinity, charismatic theology, discipleship, and 1 Corinthians. She has written a number of articles and books about women in the Bible and the church, and Paul the Apostle and women, paying particular attention to traditionally hierarchal views and the problems that arise from them. Peppiatt contends that a careful reading of 1 Corinthians 11-14 reveals that Paul’s discussion of women is intended to refute the patriarchal views held by male Christians in Corinth. She is regularly engaged as a speaker in both church and academic contexts.

In 2022 Peppiatt taught a BibleProject Classroom on 1 Corinthians and has a close working relationship with them.

== Personal life ==
Peppiatt is married to Nick Crawley, an Anglican minister and creator of Bible for Life. They have four sons, Seth, Harry, Roscoe and Jem.

== Selected publications ==
=== Books ===
- Peppiatt, Lucy (2012). The Disciple: On Becoming Truly Human. Wipf and Stock. ISBN 9781621894629.
- Peppiatt, Lucy (2017). Women and Worship at Corinth: Paul's Rhetorical Arguments in 1 Corinthians. James Clarke & Co. ISBN 9780227906217.
- Lynch, Matthew; Peppiatt, Lucy (2017). The Discipleship Course: Discovering What It Means to Follow Jesus. Westminster Theological Centre. ISBN 9781999786007.
- Peppiatt, Lucy (2018). Unveiling Paul's Women: Making Sense of 1 Corinthians 11:2-16. Wipf and Stock. ISBN 9781498289221.
- Peppiatt, Lucy (2019). Rediscovering Scripture's Vision for Women: Fresh Perspectives on Disputed Texts. InterVarsity Press. ISBN 9780830853960.
- Peppiatt, Lucy (2021). The Imago Dei: Humanity Made in the Image of God. Cascade Books. ISBN 9781498233408.

=== Articles and chapters ===
- Peppiatt, Lucy (2014). "New directions in Spirit Christology: A foundation for a charismatic theology". Theology. 117 (1): 3–10. doi:10.1177/0040571X13510227. S2CID 145062778.
- Peppiatt, Lucy (2017). "Women and Worship in Paul's Churches: Apostles, Prophets, and Teachers". The Bible and Interpretation.
- Peppiatt, Lucy (2018). "That We May Know Him ...". In Lincoln Harvey (ed.). Essays on the Trinity. Wipf and Stock. pp. 63–84. ISBN 9781532611964.
- Peppiatt, Lucy (2018). "Life in the Spirit: Christ's and Ours". In Oliver D. Crisp; Fred Sanders (eds.). The Christian Doctrine of Humanity: Explorations in Constructive Dogmatics. Zondervan Academic. pp. 165–181. ISBN 9780310595489.
- Peppiatt, Lucy (2019). "Man as the Image and Glory of God and Woman as the Glory of Man: Perspicuity or Ambiguity?". Priscilla Papers. 33 (3): 12–18.
- Peppiatt, Lucy (2020). "The Spirit of the Lord: Reflections on a Christomorphic Pneumatology". In Oliver D. Crisp; Fred Sanders (eds.). The Third Person of the Trinity: Explorations in Constructive Dogmatics. Zondervan Academic. pp. 138–160. ISBN 9780310106920.
- Peppiatt, Lucy (2021). "Gunton on community". In Andrew Pickard; Myk Habets; Murray Rae (eds.). T&T Clark Handbook of Colin Gunton. T&T Clark. pp. 205–219. ISBN 9780567673381.

=== Classes ===
- In partnership with BibleProject’s online Classroom, Dr. Peppiatt taught a class on 1 Corinthians available for free here.
