= Thomas Speed (cashier) =

Thomas Speed was Chief Cashier of the Bank of England for 1694 to 1699. On 11 February 1695, the bank issued a notice in the London Gazette that Speed, and several others, were empowered to give notes on behalf of the bank in return either for payment of money or bills. Speed was replaced as Chief Cashier by Thomas Madockes.
