= Graham Kentfield =

Graham Edward Alfred Kentfield (born 3 September 1940) was Chief Cashier of the Bank of England from 1991 to 1998. The signature of the Chief Cashier appears on British banknotes. Kentfield was replaced as Chief Cashier by Merlyn Lowther.
