= Matthew Marshall =

Chief Cashier of the Bank of England (1791-1873)

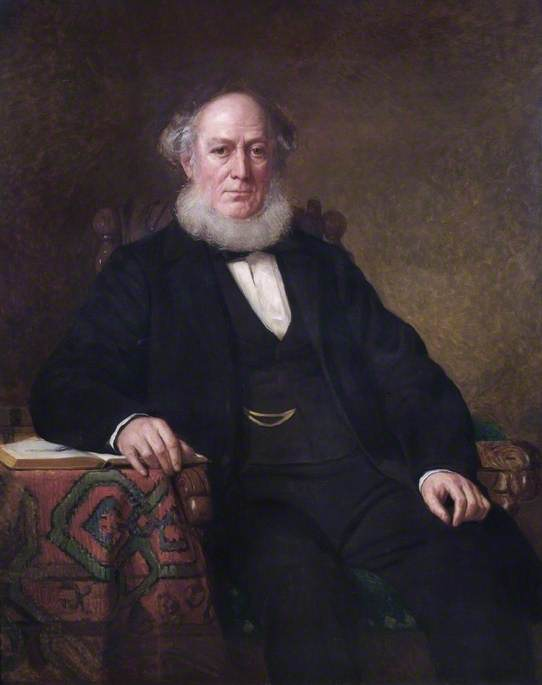
Matthew Marshall by Thomas Mackinlay, Bank of England Museum, London.

Matthew Marshall (1791–1873) was the Chief Cashier of the Bank of England from 1835 to 1864.

== Life ==
He was the fourth son of John and Mary Marshall of Amersham; James Henry Marshall of Aylesbury was an elder brother. He started work at the Bank of England in 1810, at age 19.

Marshall worked at the Bank of England for 54 years, retiring in 1864. For a period to 1855, banknotes bore the words "I promise to pay Matthew Marshall or bearer", then changing to "I promise to pay to bearer, on demand". His signature as cashier was on the notes; from 1855 to 1865 it appeared as a watermark, a distinctive measure not then continued.

Marshall was replaced as Chief Cashier by William Miller, his deputy and son-in-law. He retired on full salary, and died at Amersham House, Beckenham, Kent.

== Family ==
Marshall married Charlotte Jane Wilkin in 1820: they had a son Matthew and a daughter Elizabeth. Matthew Marshall Jr. set up the broking firm Marshall & Sons, in the family to 1967, when it was taken over by Cater Ryder.
