= Frank May (cricketer) =

English cricketer and stockbroker (1862–1907)

Personal information
- Full name: Frank Boyd May
- Born: 24 October 1862; Westminster, Middlesex, England
- Died: 1 June 1907 (aged 44); Hurley, Berkshire, England
- Batting: Unknown

Domestic team information
- Years: Team
- 1898–1906: Marylebone Cricket Club

Career statistics
Competition	First-class
Matches	4
Runs scored	12
Batting average	2.00
100s/50s	–/–
Top score	7
Catches/stumpings	2/–
- Source: Cricinfo, 10 May 2021

Frank Boyd May (24 October 1862 – 1 June 1907) was an English first-class cricketer and stockbroker.

The son of Frank May senior, he was born at Westminster in October 1862 and was educated at Clifton College. After completing his education, he entered the London Stock Exchange as a stockbroker. A member of the Marylebone Cricket Club (MCC), May played first-class cricket for the MCC, making four appearances. He played against Kent in 1898, Sussex and Worcestershire in 1899, and Oxford University in 1906. He had little success in his four matches, scoring 12 runs with a highest score of 7. It was proposed by May at the Annual General Meeting of the MCC on 2 May 1906 that in a two-day match, the captain of the batting side has power to declare his innings closed at any time, but such declaration may not be made on the first day later than one hour and forty minutes before the hour of drawing stumps. After some discussion the resolution was passed. May was declared a defaulter on the Stock Exchange on 1 June 1907. May returned to his home at Hurley in Berkshire later that evening and committed suicide by shooting himself. He was survived by his wife and two daughters.
