= Nairne baronets =

Extinct baronetcy in the Baronetage of the United Kingdom

There have been two baronetcies created for persons with the surname Nairne, one in the Baronetage of Nova Scotia and one in the Baronetage of the United Kingdom.

The Nairne Baronetcy, of Dunsinane near Collace in the County of Perth, was created as a Baronetage of Nova Scotia (Scotland) on 31 March 1704 by Queen Anne for Thomas Nairne. The title became dormant on the death of the fifth Baronet in 1811.

The Nairne Baronetcy of Kirkcudbright, was created in the Baronetage of the United Kingdom on 7 August 1917 for John Nairne, a former Chief Cashier of the Bank of England. He was later a director of the Bank (1925-1931), and governor of the BBC (1927-1932). The baronetcy became extinct on his death on 9 February 1945.

== Nairne baronets, of Dunsinane (1704) ==
- Sir Thomas Nairne, 1st Baronet (1654– c. 1721)
- Sir William Nairne, 2nd Baronet (1689–1754)
- Sir Thomas Nairne, 3rd Baronet (1708–1760)
- Sir William Graham Nairne, 4th Baronet (1744–1790)
- Sir William Nairne, Lord Dunsinane, 5th Baronet (c. 1731–1811)

== Nairne baronets, of Kirkcudbright (1917) ==
- Sir John Gordon Nairne, 1st Baronet (1861–1945)

== See also ==
- Nairn baronets
