= Cyril Patrick Mahon =

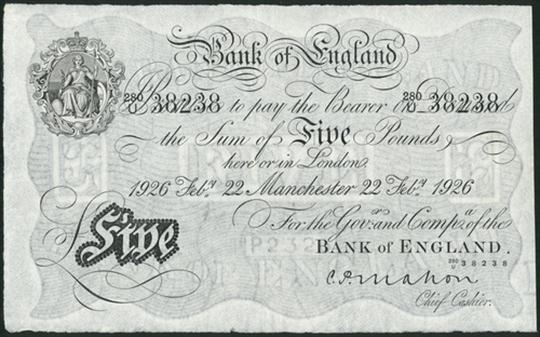
A Mahon signed Bank of England £5 note of 1926.

Cyril Patrick Mahon (9 September 1882 – 14 July 1945) was a British banker who served as Chief Cashier of the Bank of England from 1925 to 1929 and comptroller of the Bank from 1929 to 1932. Mahon was succeeded as Chief Cashier by Basil G. Catterns.

Mahon was born in Leigh-on-Mendip, Somerset, the son of village vicar Rev. George Augustus Mahon. He was educated at All Saints School, Clifton, and at All Saints School, Bloxham, Oxfordshire.

He worked for a year at Lincoln Bank in Grimsby before joining the Bank of England in March 1901. In 1916, he was appointed assistant principal of the Discount Office before being promoted to assistant chief cashier in 1918, deputy chief cashier in 1923 and chief cashier in 1926. He was appointed to his final position, comptroller, in 1929, which was then the senior official position in the Bank. In 1932, health problems forced him into early retirement at age 49.

Following his death in Taunton, Somerset in 1945, The Times recalled him as "a man of outstanding character, and his technical ability and clarity of judgment were of great service to the Bank during the troublous years after the 1914–18 war."

== A. P. Mahon ==
A. Patrick Mahon (known as Patrick) was born on 18 April 1921, to Cyril Patrick Mahon. From 1934 to 1939 he attended Marlborough College. In October 1939 went up to attend Clare College, Cambridge, to read Modern Languages. In July 1941, having achieved a first in both German and French in the Modern Languages Part II, he joined the army, serving as a private (acting lance corporal) in the Essex Regiment for several months before being sent to Bletchley Park. Mahon joined Hut 8 in October 1941, and was its head from the autumn of 1944 until the end of the war. On his release from Bletchley in early 1946 he did not return to Cambridge to obtain his degree but joined the John Lewis & Partners department stores. John Spedan Lewis, founder of the company, was a friend of Hut 8 veteran Conel Hugh O'Donel Alexander, who arranged the introduction. Mahon spent his entire subsequent career at John Lewis & Partners, where, he rapidly achieved promotion to director level, but his health deteriorated over a long period. Mahon died on 13 April 1972.
