= Frank May (cashier) =

Chief Cashier of the Bank of England from 1873 to 1893

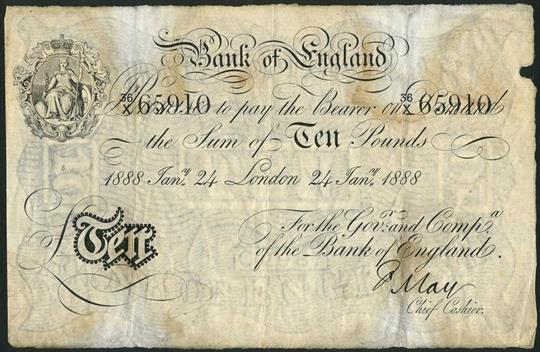
A Frank May signed Bank of England £10 banknote of 1888.

Frank May was the Chief Cashier of the Bank of England from 1873 to 1893. May was replaced as Chief Cashier by Horace Bowen.
