= Chief Cashier of the Bank of England =

English public official responsible for issuing bank notes

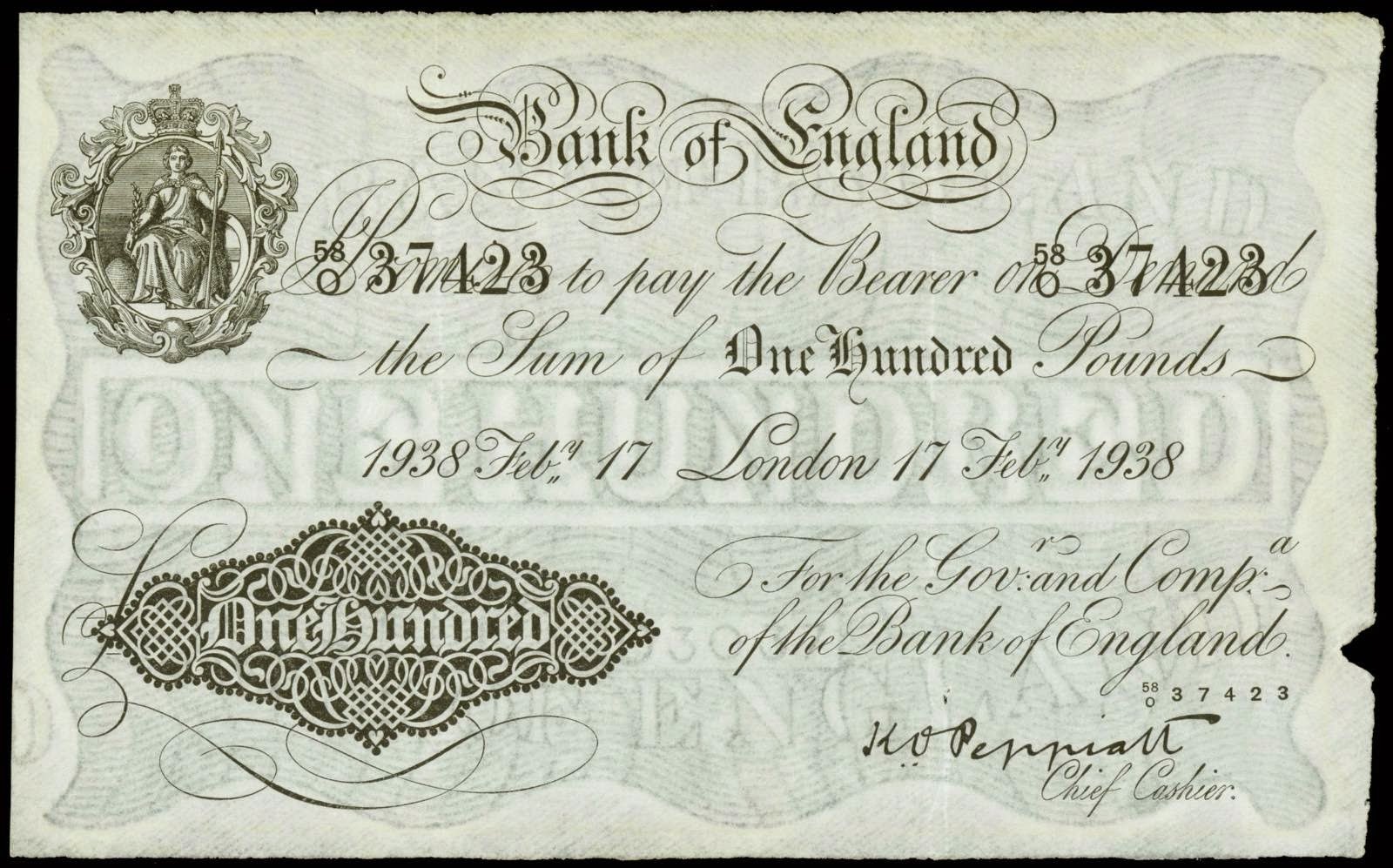
£100 note from 1938 bearing the signature of the then Chief Cashier, Kenneth Peppiatt

The Chief Cashier of the Bank of England is a senior official of the Bank of England. The Chief Cashier is the person responsible for issuing banknotes and is the director of the Bank of England's banking infrastructure. In 2004, the position was combined with that of the Executive Director of Banking. Since 1870, the signature of the Chief Cashier has appeared on all Bank of England note issues.

The post is currently held by Rhys Phillips, who was appointed in October 2026.

== Responsibilities ==
The position has the following responsibilities:

- The security and effective operation of real-time gross settlement in the UK's high value payment systems (CHAPS and CREST).
- Alongside the Bank's Sterling Markets Division, they are also responsible for the provision of liquidity to the market and settlement banks.
- The issuing and effective distribution of banknotes and their security against counterfeiting.
- The provision of banking services, focusing on high-value government banking.

The Executive Director Banking & Chief Cashier is a member of the Governor's Executive Team, which is the Bank's senior management group.

== History ==
In 1694, the Bank of England was established. Almost immediately, the Bank started to issue notes in return for deposits. The crucial feature that made Bank of England notes a means of exchange was the promise to pay the bearer the sum of the note on demand. This meant that the note could be redeemed at the Bank for gold or coinage by anyone presenting it for payment. If it was not redeemed in full, it was endorsed with the amount withdrawn. These notes were initially handwritten on Bank paper and signed by one of the Bank's cashiers.

During the 18th century, there was a gradual move towards fixed denomination notes. In 1725, the Bank started issuing partly printed notes for completion in manuscript. The £ sign and the first digit were printed but the cashier's signature alongside the name of the payee and other numerals were added by hand.

The first fully printed notes appeared in 1855 relieving the cashiers of the task of filling in the name of the payee and signing each note individually. The practice of writing the name of the Chief Cashier as the payee on notes was halted in favour of the anonymous "I promise to pay the bearer on demand the sum of …", a feature that has remained unchanged on notes to this day. The printed signature on the note continued to be that of one of three cashiers until 1870; since then, it has always been that of the Chief Cashier. The Bank of England notes on its website that the promise holds "for all time", even after notes have been withdrawn from circulation. This means that every Bank of England note may be exchanged for its face value at any time.

== Chief Cashiers of the Bank of England ==
Listed below are the names of people who have held the post of Chief Cashier at the Bank of England:

- 1694–1694: John Kendrick
- 1694–1699: Thomas Speed
- 1699–1739: Thomas Madockes
- 1739–1751: James Collier and Daniel Race (jointly)
- 1751–1759: Daniel Race and Elias Simes (jointly)
- 1759–1775: Daniel Race
- 1775–1777: Charles Jewson
- 1778–1807: Abraham Newland
- 1807–1829: Henry Hase
- 1829–1835: Thomas Rippon
- 1835–1864: Matthew Marshall
- 1864–1866: William Miller
- 1866–1873: George Forbes
- 1873–1893: Frank May
- 1893–1902: Horace Bowen
- 1902–1918: Sir John Gordon Nairne, 1st Baronet
- 1918–1925: Ernest Musgrave Harvey
- 1925–1929: Cyril Patrick Mahon
- 1929–1934: Basil G. Catterns
- 1934–1949: Kenneth Peppiatt
- 1949–1955: Percival Beale
- 1955–1962: Leslie O'Brien
- 1962–1966: Jasper Hollom
- 1966–1970: John Standish Fforde
- 1970–1980: John Page
- 1980–1988: David Somerset
- 1988–1991: Malcolm Gill
- 1991–1998: Graham Kentfield
- 1999 – 31 December 2003: Merlyn Lowther
- 1 January 2004 – 1 April 2011: Andrew Bailey
- 2011–2014: Chris Salmon
- June 2014 – 2018: Victoria Cleland
- 2018–2025: Sarah John
- 2025 – 18 October 2026: Victoria Cleland
- 19 October 2026 – present: Rhys Phillips

== See also ==
- Deputy Governor of the Bank of England
- Governor of the Bank of England
