= Lady Nairne =

Lady Nairne may refer to:

- Carolina Nairne (1766–1845), songwriter and baroness
- Margaret Mercer Elphinstone (1788–1867), Scottish society hostess
- Emily Petty-Fitzmaurice, Marchioness of Lansdowne, the 8th Lady Nairne
- Katherine Evelyn Constance Bigham, Viscountess Mersey, 12th Lady Nairne (1912–1995), holding the position of Lord Nairne
