= Sir Gordon Nairne, 1st Baronet =

Director of the Bank of England (1861-1945)

Sir John Gordon Nairne, 1st Baronet (4 January 1861 – 9 February 1945) was a director of the Bank of England and a BBC governor.

== Life ==
He was born in Castle Douglas, Kirkcudbrightshire, Scotland. He was the son of Andrew Nairne and his wife Isabella H. Macartney, daughter of Robert Macartney of Auchencairn and Dundrinnan (Dundrennan House), sister of Halliday Macartney.

Nairne joined the Bank of England as a cashier in 1893. In the 1901 Census his occupation is indicated as Deputy Chief Cashier of the Bank of England. He was Chief Cashier of the Bank of England 1902-1918.

He was made a Baronet, Nairne of Kirkcudbright, on 7 August 1917. In 1918 he was made an Officer of the Légion d'honneur by the President of the French Republic. In 1920 he was awarded the Order of the Sacred Treasure (second class), by the Emperor of Japan. From 1925–1939 he was one of the members of the Commission of Lieutenancy for the City of London.

He was a Director of the Bank of England from 1925 to 1931, and Governor of the British Broadcasting Corporation from 1927-1932.

Nairne died on 9 February 1945 in Tring Hertfordshire.

== Family ==
Nairne married Narciza da Costa Ricci, the fifth daughter of Baron Anselmo da Costa Ricci. The wedding took place at St James's Church, Paddington on 15 December 1894.

Baronetage of the United Kingdom
New creation	Baronet (of Kirkcudbright); 1917–1945	Extinct
