= Abraham Newland =

English banker

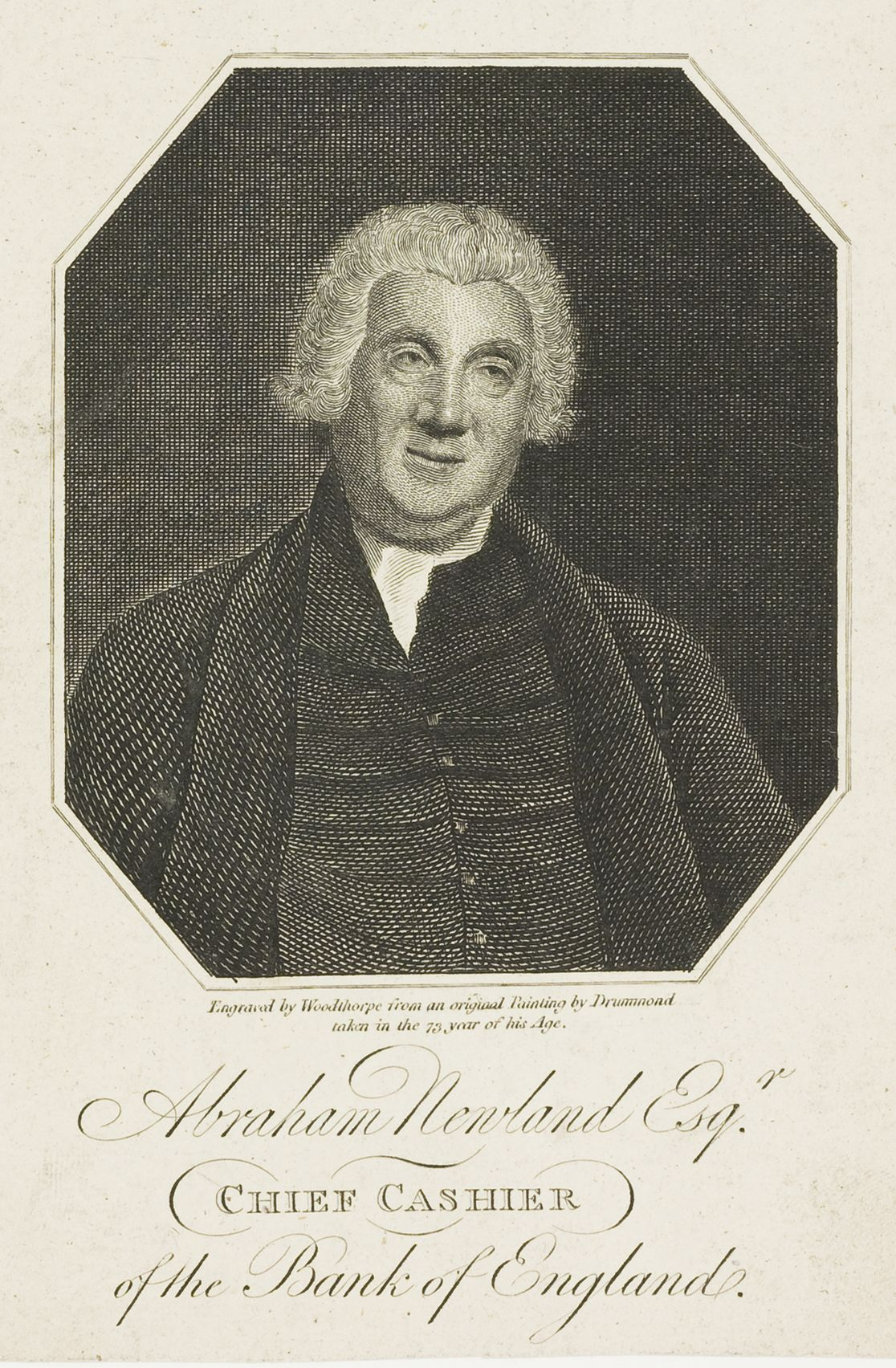
Abraham Newland, ca. 1800

Abraham Newland (c. 1730 – 21 November 1807) was the chief cashier at the Bank of England from 1782 to 1807. The expression "an Abraham Newland" came to mean a bank note, because without his signature, a Bank of England note was not negotiable.

Abraham was the son of William Newland and Anne Arnold. His father was a Southwark baker.

He slept in the Bank of England itself for 25 years, so he was largely a stranger to his own house adjoining Highbury Fields.

When he resigned in 1807, he declined an annuity but accepted a 1000-guinea service of plate.

When he died, he bequeathed many legacies to various family members, including Edmund Edwin, Yeoman Gentleman of Aldbury. He made his money mostly by speculating in shares of loans to the government, as a private investor.

He is perhaps best known among collectors of trivia for his self-written epitaph: "Beneath this stone old Abraham lies; / Nobody laughs, and nobody cries. / Where he has gone, and how he fares / Nobody knows and nobody cares."
