= Darlinghurst Seven =

Irish Republican internees in Australia

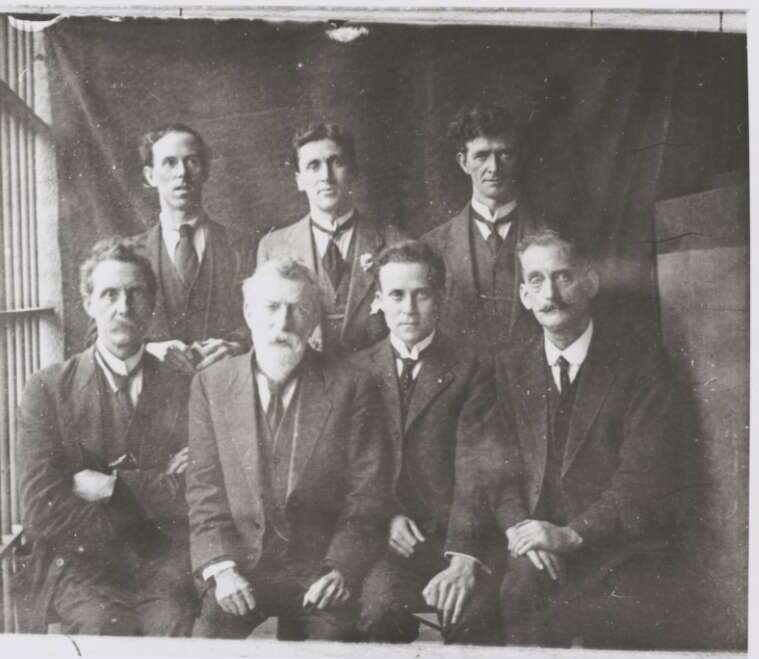
Standing, from left: McKeown, McGuinness, McGing. Seated from left: McSweeny, Dalton, Dryer, Fitzgerald

The Darlinghurst Seven were Irish-Australians interned in Darlinghurst Gaol, Sydney in 1918 for suspected involvement with the Irish Republican Brotherhood (IRB).

The seven men were Albert Thomas Dryer (30), Michael McGing (37), William Francis McGuinness (29) and Edmund McSweeny (57) from Sydney, Maurice Dalton (75) and Francis James McKeown (34) from Melbourne and Thomas Fitzgerald (48) from Brisbane. They were all office-bearers of the Irish National Association, which had been founded in 1915 to ‘assist Ireland to achieve her national destiny’ and ‘preserve the ideal of Ireland's sovereignty’.

Following the Easter Rising of 1916 the accused men had participated in forming circles of the IRB in Australia. This was regarded as a disloyal activity as Australia was at war with Germany which had been an ally of the Irish rebels. The Irish community in Australia opposed attempts to introduce conscription, which was defeated in referendums in 1916 and 1917.

The seven men were arrested on 18 June 1918 and detained under Regulation 56A of the War Precautions Regulations. An Inquiry into their arrest was held during August 1918 by Mr Justice Harvey, who recommended they continue in custody.

Six of the men were released on 18 December 1918, while Dryer was detained until 11 February 1919. A function to welcome the Sydney internees home was held in St Patrick’s hall, Church Hill. Similar events were held in Melbourne and Brisbane.

Two other men were detained with them who had been arrested separately. William Joseph Fegan (41) was one of the founders of the I.N.A. in Brisbane and was arrested on 25 October 1917. Michael Kiely (37), who was not connected to the I.N.A., was arrested in Burnie, Tasmania on 25 June 1918. Fegan was released on 18 December 1918 and Kiely was held until 26 January 1919.

== Bibliography ==
- Australian Dictionary of Biography: Dryer, Albert Thomas
- People Australia: McGing, Michael
- People Australia: McGuinness, William Francis
- People Australia: McSweeny, Edmund
- Harvey Report
- Keith Harvey, ‘The Darlinghurst Seven – Irish “Sinn Fein” internees in Australia during WW1’
- Jeff Kildea, 'The Eighth Man: William Joseph Fegan and the Darlinghurst Seven'
- Michael Kiely, National Archives of Australia
