= John Musgrave Harvey =

Australian judge (1865–1940)

Sir John Harvey

Judge of the Supreme Court of New South Wales
- In office 15 April 1913 – 31 January 1936
- Preceded by: George Rich
- Succeeded by: Harold Nicholas

Personal details
- Born: 22 December 1865 Hampstead, London, England
- Died: 13 June 1940 (aged 74) Double Bay, Sydney, Australia
- Spouse: Beatrice Ward (m. 1895)

Sir John Musgrave Harvey (22 December 1865 – 13 June 1940) was an English—Australian judge who served on the Supreme Court of New South Wales from 1913 to 1936. He was Chief Judge in Equity from 1925 to 1935 and Acting Chief Justice from 1933 to 1934, as well as chairing multiple New South Wales royal commissions.

== Early life and family ==
Harvey was born in Hampstead, London, England, the sixth of eight children born to Frances Harriet (née Brewster) and Charles Musgrave Harvey. His father and grandfather were Anglican priests, and his older brother Richard served as Archdeacon of Halifax. His younger brother Sir Ernest Musgrave Harvey was Chief Cashier of the Bank of England and the first of the Harvey baronets.

Harvey was educated at Marlborough College from 1878 to 1884 on a scholarship. He was a prefect and member of the rugby team. He subsequently won a scholarship to Keble College, Oxford, where he graduated with a Bachelor of Arts in 1888. Harvey arrived in Australia in 1889, where he had found a position as tutor to the children of a Sydney lawyer. He subsequently developed an interest in the law himself, and was mentored by Langer Owen.

== Legal career ==
From 1890 to 1893, Harvey was an associate to William Owen, the Chief Judge in Equity on the Supreme Court of New South Wales. He was called to the bar in March 1892, and developed a speciality in equity. He authored a number of important texts on the subject, including Service of Equitable Process (1898) and The Practice in Equity (1902; co-authored with George Rich). He was also a reporter for the New South Wales Law Reports and the New South Wales Weekly Notes.

== Judicial career ==
Although still considered a "junior barrister", Harvey was appointed to the Supreme Court of New South Wales on 15 April 1913. He replaced George Rich, who had been elevated to the High Court of Australia. He was made a judge in the probate division in 1918, and Chief Judge in Equity in 1925. In June 1933, Chief Justice Philip Street took a leave of absence pending his official retirement in January 1934. In Street's absence, Harvey was the most senior judge on the bench and thus became Acting Chief Justice. He was suffered from failing eyesight by that time, however, and formally retired in January 1936 after a year of leave.

In 1918, Harvey chaired a state Royal Commission into the law of property, with the aim of simplifying the practice of conveyancing. Many of his recommendations were incorporated into the Conveyancing Act 1919, which remains in effect. In the same year, Harvey also conducted an inquiry for the federal government under the terms of the War Precautions Act 1914. He was tasked with investigating whether the military detention of the Darlinghurst Seven – seven members of the Irish Republican Brotherhood at Darlinghurst Gaol – was justified; his report concluded that they should continue to be imprisoned. He was also an official visitor to prisoner-of-war camps during World War I.

Harvey conducted two further Royal Commissions for the state government during the 1920s. The first was a 1927 inquiry into the administration of the Child Welfare Department, while the second was a 1928 inquiry into the Sydney City Council's contract with Babcock & Wilcox for the construction of the Bunnerong Power Station. In the latter, he found that a bribe had been paid to the acting general manager of the Electricity Department, but that the company's tender should nonetheless still be accepted as it was the best bid available.

== Personal life ==
Harvey married Beatrice Ward on 4 January 1895. The couple had one son and three daughters together. He was a warden of St Mark's Church, Darling Point, for 28 years, and from 1934 to 1938 was chancellor of the Anglican Diocese of Sydney. He was also the foundation chairman of Cranbrook School from 1918 to 1938; one of the school's houses is named in his honour.

Harvey died at his home in Double Bay on 13 June 1940, at the age of 74. His estate was valued at £22,225.
