= Alexander Green (executioner) =

Australian executioner (c. 1802 – 1879)

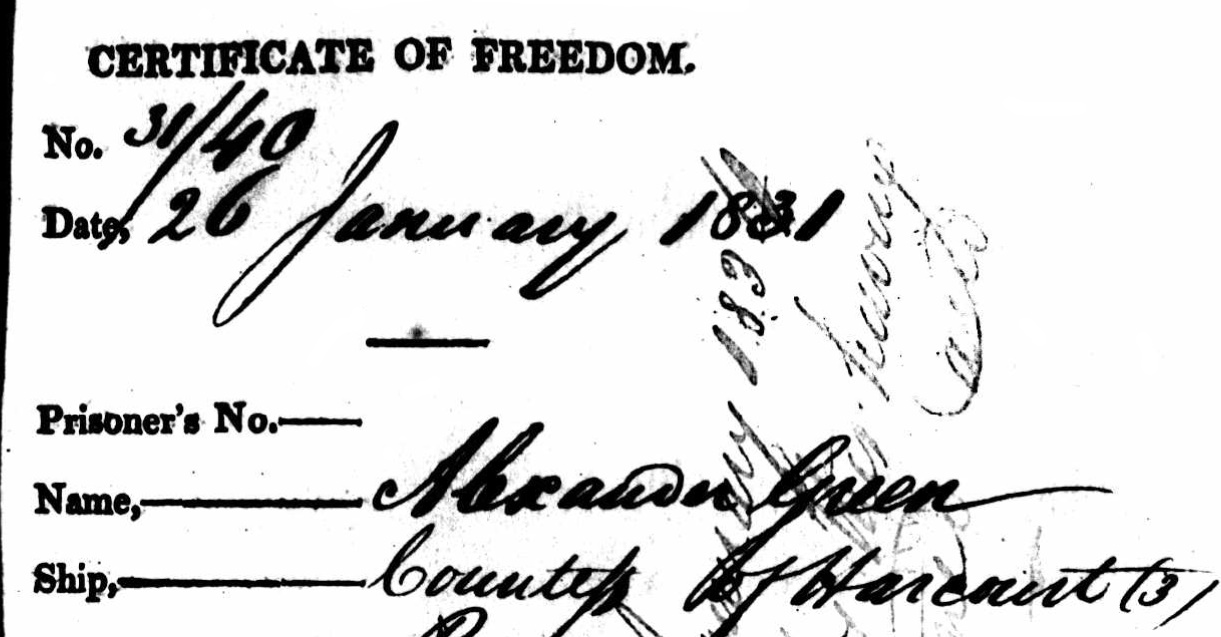
- Extract from Green's Certificate of Freedom, dated 26 January 1831.
- Born: c. 1802; The Netherlands or Ireland
- Died: 31 August 1879; Parramatta, New South Wales, Australia
- Occupation: Hangman
- Years active: 1834 – 1855

Alexander Green (c. 1802–1879) was an Australian executioner. He arrived in the colony of New South Wales in 1824 as a convict and was granted a Certificate of Freedom in 1831. During the period 1826 to late 1833 Green was employed as a flagellator, or scourger, at Sydney, Port Stephens and the Hunter Valley, inflicting floggings on those who had received a sentence of corporal punishment. In February 1834 he was appointed as the colony's public executioner, beginning a career of twenty-one years during which Green carried out about 250 hangings. During most of his employment as the New South Wales hangman, judicial executions were able to be viewed by the public. His last execution in February 1855 was the first private hanging after the enactment of legislation to abolish public executions in New South Wales. Towards the end of his career Green's behaviour became increasingly erratic due to drunkenness and mental instability. He was declared to be insane in April 1855 and committed to a lunatic asylum. Alexander Green died at the Parramatta Asylum on 31 August 1879.^{[A]}

== Biography ==
=== Early life ===
Alexander Green was born in about 1802. Records about Green's place of birth vary, though his early convict records indicate he was born in Holland.

In early 1824 Green was charged with stealing textile fabric from the shop of James Sayer; he was convicted on 16 January 1824 at the Shrewsbury General Quarter Sessions (in Shropshire, in the West Midlands of England), and sentenced to transportation for life. In early February he was placed aboard the prison hulk Justitia, moored on the River Thames.

=== Transportation to Australia ===
Green was transported to New South Wales with 170 other convicts aboard the Countess of Harcourt. The vessel departed from England on 23 March 1824 and arrived at Sydney Cove on 12 July. On his arrival in Sydney the convict indents describe Green in the following terms: Alexander Green, born in Holland and aged 22 years; occupation, "tumbler" (acrobat); 5 feet 4.5 inches (163.8 cm) tall, with light blue eyes, very fair hair and a pale, slightly pitted, complexion.

Green was initially assigned to William Hutchison, part-owner of a flour-mill at Waterloo. In May 1825 correspondence was received from the authorities in England informing the Colonial Secretary in Sydney that Green's life sentence had been commuted to transportation for seven years. During 1825 Hutchinson sold his interest in the Waterloo flour-mill and Green's assignment was transferred in August 1825 to the Rev. Samuel Marsden at Parramatta.

=== Scourger ===
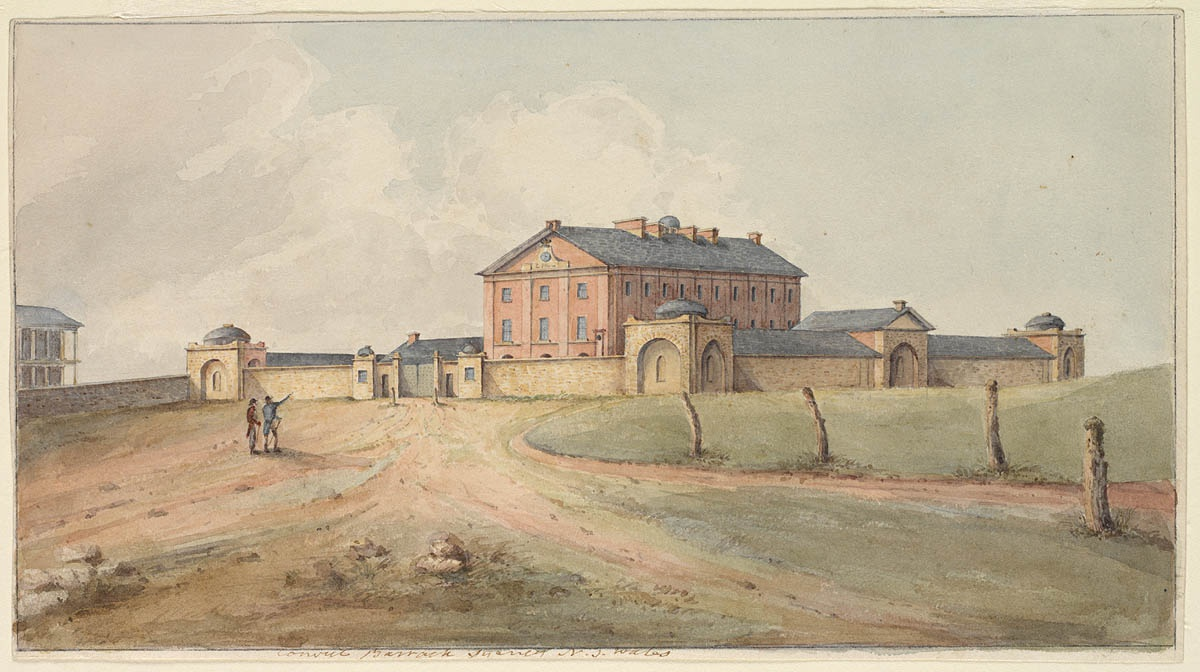
The convict barracks at Hyde Park in Sydney.

In early 1826 Green was brought back to Sydney and housed at the Hyde Park Barracks, where he was employed as "a probationer flagellator", also known as a scourger or flogger, whose job was to inflict floggings on those who had received a judicial sentence of corporal punishment. At about that time Robert Dawson, the manager of the Australian Agricultural Company (A.A.Co.), wrote to the Colonial Secretary requesting the services of a flagellator to be attached to the police at Port Stephens. The company was commencing operations in the area, making use of a large contingent of convicts. Green volunteered for the position and he was sent by boat from Sydney to Port Stephens.

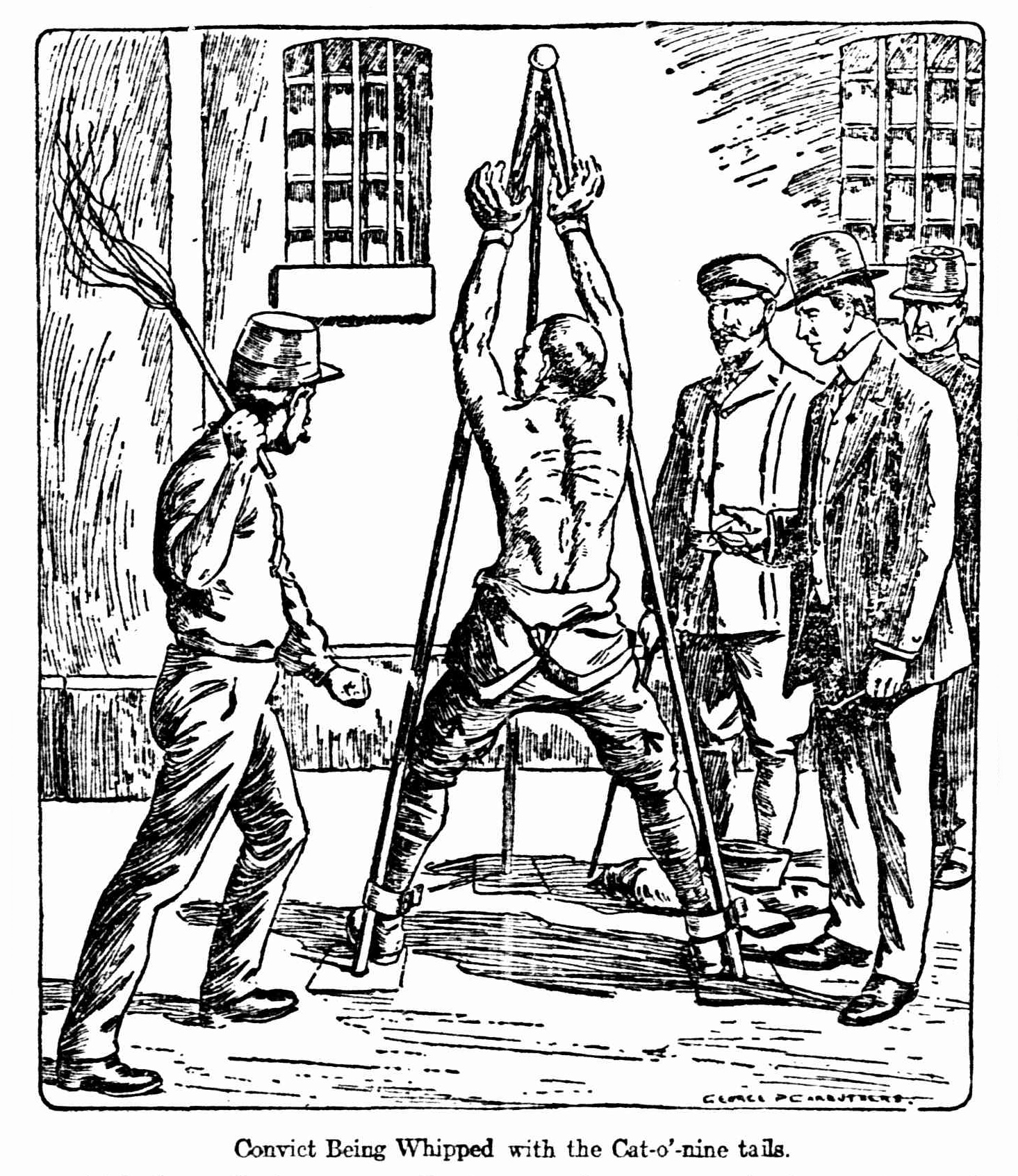
Illustration of a convict being flogged.

In April 1827 Green was appointed as an Honorary Constable at Port Stephens, but two months later he was dismissed from the position after he assisted another constable named John Maher in perpetrating an assault. Maher was also dismissed for the assault and an additional charge of drunkenness.

In the Census of November 1828 Green was recorded as living at Port Stephens and working with the A.A.Co. as a labourer. At some time during the following year he was returned to Hyde Park Barracks in Sydney where, in November 1829, he was promoted from probationary to third-class scourger. In April 1830 he received another promotion, to second-class scourger.

On 26 January 1831 Green was granted a Certificate of Freedom after having served his seven-year sentence. By 1831 Green's hair had turned white and he had a large scar across his nose and cheek, as well as scars on the fingers of his right hand.^{[B]}

Green continued to be employed as a scourger at the Hyde Park Barracks until the end of August 1832, when he was replaced by John McDonough. Green then found employment as a scourger at the 'Merton' estate (near Denman in the Hunter Valley), a parcel of land granted to William Ogilvie. Early in 1833 Green was hospitalised, but resumed working as a scourger at 'Merton' by early March. In October 1833 Green submitted an application to resign from his position at 'Merton', but he was informed by the local Bench of Magistrates that he was to remain until a successor arrived. In early December 1833 Ogilvie informed the Colonial Secretary, Alexander Macleay, that Green had absconded from 'Merton'. In January 1834 Green, by then living in King Street in Sydney, submitted his version of events to the Colonial Secretary. He claimed he had resigned "through actual fear of losing his life" after a man had "used most violent and opprobrious language" to him. Out of a fear for his life, Green had the man brought before the Bench of Magistrates, but afterwards others spoke to him in a similarly threatening manner, such that he was afraid to "venture out to look after... cattle". Green's petition was ignored until early August, when it was sent to the Merton Bench for comment. Ogilvie responded in late October 1834, disputing Green's version of events.

=== Executioner ===
==== Sydney Gaol ====
On 17 January 1834 the New South Wales Sheriff, Thomas Macquoid, wrote to the Colonial Secretary nominating Alexander Green as the replacement for Thomas Hughes, who had been the colony's public executioner since 1811. Mcquoid explained that Hughes had "for some time been unable to perform his duty in a proper manner from the gradual decay of his sight". Green's appointment was approved and he commenced in the position in February 1834 on a salary of one shilling and sixpence per day. Green's assistant in his new role was Thomas Worrall, who had been working as Thomas Hughes' assistant since 1822. Worrall was a transported convict serving a life sentence.

Green's appointment as executioner was acknowledged in several of the colonial newspapers. The Australian announced: "A new Jack Ketch is at present taking his degrees and what is more surprising, he is a freed man. – So much for taste". The Sydney Monitor newspaper reported that Hughes "has been allowed to retire from his arduous duties, on a pension, after holding the situation for many years", adding that his successor, Green, "is well-known in the Colony, having officiated as scourger at almost every Government station".

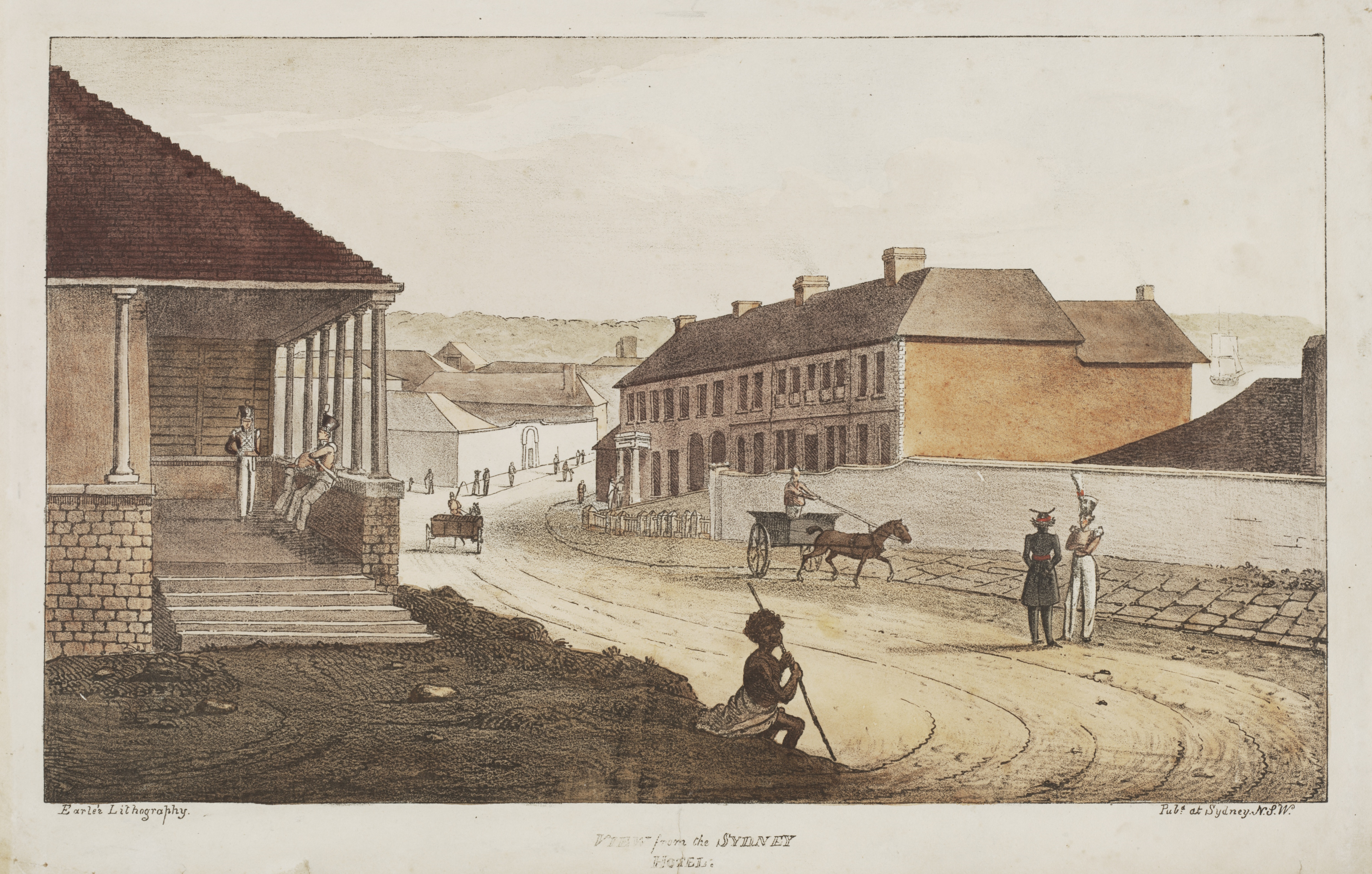
A view of Sydney (c. 1826) by Augustus Earle (1793-1838), with the walls of Sydney Gaol in the background.

Green's base of operations during his first seven years as the colony's executioner was the Sydney Gaol (also known as the County Gaol), constructed in 1800, on the corner of George and Essex streets in The Rocks area of Sydney. Green's first assignment as public executioner was probably the hanging of three prisoners in "the felons' yard" of Sydney Gaol on 6 March 1834. The condemned men were William Johnson, William Elliott and Edward Gill (or Gills).^{[C]} The scaffold was located at the rear of the gaol; members of the public were granted access to the gaol-yard to witness hangings and the structure was also visible to the public from a nearby hill outside the gaol walls.

One early morning in August 1834, in a section of The Domain overlooking Sydney Cove, Green was caught by a police constable in a dalliance with a married woman named Bridget Horrigan. The woman was charged with deserting her home and "entertaining an inveterate love for a gentleman connected with the finishing department of the law", as a result of which she was sentenced to two months' hard labour at the Parramatta Female Factory.

In September 1834 Green was sent to the Norfolk Island penal settlement for the execution of thirteen mutineers, convicted after the rebellion that occurred on the island on 15 January 1834. The brig Governor Phillip departed for Norfolk Island on 10 September, with Green and two clerics on board, an Anglican and a Catholic. The priests were to provide spiritual solace to the men before the hangman performed his job. Seven of the mutineers were hanged on 22 September and the remaining six were executed the following day.

On 8 April 1836 Green was brought before the Police Court "for using his usual threatening language" towards a widowed laundress named Ester Howell. Only two days previously the hangman had been bound to keep the peace in regard to his harassment of the woman. Green's previous recognisances were forfeited and he was jailed for the offence. The journalist who reported the case commented on Green's physical appearance: "The man Green is well fitted for this office, judging from his countenance, for if ever the whole evil passions of man could be concentrated into one face, he is the man who may rejoice in it", adding: "What a skull for a phrenologist!".

On Wednesday night, 22 June 1837, Green was put into the watch-house in a state of intoxication. In the cell during the night Green extracted from his pocket a piece of cord, knotted into a noose, and grabbed a man named Dennis Sullivan, also incarcerated for drunkenness; he slipped the noose over Sullivan's head and pulled it tight. The constables keeping watch heard "a noisy spluttering sound... and found Sullivan kicking out, and foaming at the mouth, evidently at the last gasp". He was quickly released, but took some time to recover from the ordeal. The next day Green appeared before a magistrate, charged with being intoxicated and having been "found upon a person's premises for unlawful purposes". When Green's occupation was revealed, the magistrate declined to put the hangman in the stocks, discharging him instead, but concluded by warning the offender that "you may depend upon it that you will be punished in a different manner to being put in the stocks if again brought here".

In September 1838 Green applied to marry a 42-year-old widow named Alien Robinson, a convict who had arrived in Sydney in December 1837. Permission was granted and they married at St. James' Church on 15 October 1838.

The adoption in New South Wales of various English legal statutes in 1837 and 1838 included reforms that removed the mandatory death sentence for all but the worst crimes, which resulted in a dramatic decline in the number of executions. Death remained as a possible penalty for rape in New South Wales, with an English statute abandoning the death penalty for rape and carnal knowledge of a girl under 10 years of age being deliberately not adopted in the colony.

In a trial that commenced on 27 November 1838, seven men – Charles Kilmeister, James Oates, Edward Foley, John Russell, John Johnstone, William Hawkins and James Parry – were indicted on a range of charges relating to the massacre of a group of Aborigines on 10 June 1838 at Myall Creek, near the Gwydir River in northern New South Wales. An earlier trial had resulted in acquittals. At the second trial the seven men were found guilty and sentenced to death. The convictions attracted widespread public interest, including petitions to the Governor to extend mercy to the condemned men. The seven convicted men were executed within the walls of the Sydney Gaol on 18 December 1838, carried out by Green and his assistant Worrall.

In January 1840 Green was living at a house in Castlereagh Street North belonging to a couple named Whitehead. The hangman and a woman named Susannah Rogers were lodgers at the house. On 11 January 1840 a quantity of stolen groceries were found at the residence and Mrs. Whitehead and her two lodgers were taken into custody on suspicion of being involved in the theft.

In November 1840 Green was brought before the court at the Sydney Quarter Sessions, "indicted for a violent assault upon his wife". Inspector Ryan had arrived at Green's house on 6 September 1840 and found Green's wife "insensible from ill treatment". He took Green into custody, though he was later released on bail. At the trial Alien (named as Ellen) Green stated that she did not wish to proceed with the prosecution, as her husband "had been sufficiently punished" and had "behaved well to her and her children, both previously and subsequently to the assault charged". However the case was proceeded with, based on the evidence of Margaret Robinson, Green's step-daughter. Margaret deposed that Green had beat her mother "with a pot-stick" and "kicked her several times in the side". She admitted calling her step-father "an howdacious hangman", but only as a reaction to him beating her mother. In his defence Green stated that the whole affair "had been a drunken spree between himself and his wife". He was found guilty and sentenced to six months' imprisonment in Sydney Gaol.

On 4 June 1841, on the eve of the transfer of prisoners to the new gaol at Darlinghurst, the final execution at the Sydney Gaol was carried out by Green in the gaol-yard. Michael Lynch was a sawyer from the Illawarra district who had been convicted of the murder of another sawyer named Matthew Sullivan near Jamberoo in July 1840. On the scaffold the prisoner gave a lengthy address "to the assembled multitude", during which he declared his innocence. After the drop "the unfortunate man died without a struggle".

==== Move to Darlinghurst ====
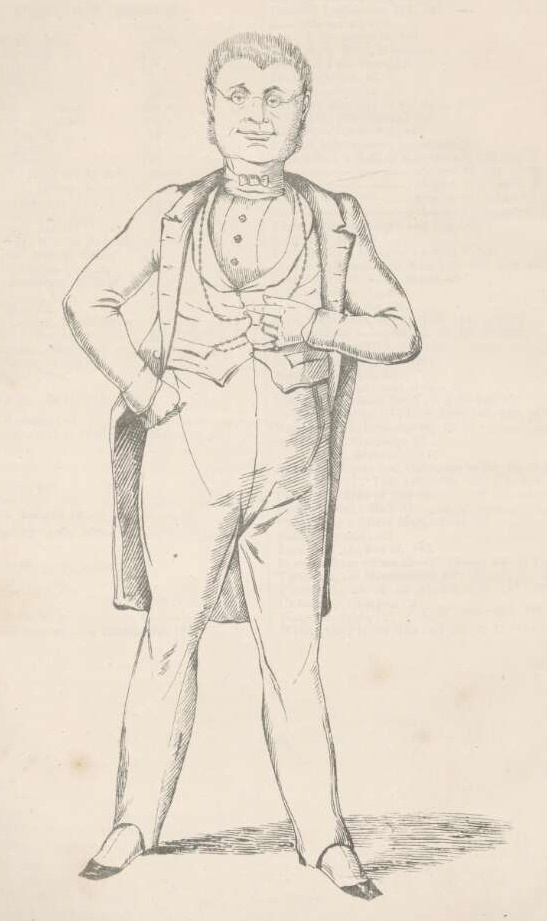
Henry Keck, Governor of Darlinghurst Gaol and Green's supervisor.

By 1841 work on the gaol at Darlinghurst was sufficiently advanced to enable the accommodation of prisoners. It was proclaimed a public prison on 2 June 1841. On 7 June the prisoners were transferred; 407 male prisoners and 39 female prisoners were walked in chains from the old gaol to the new. In October 1841 Henry Keck, who had been the Principal Gaoler at Sydney Gaol since October 1837, was appointed as superintendent of Darlinghurst Gaol.

On 29 October 1841 Green carried out the executions of two convicted murderers, the first hangings at the new gaol at Darlinghurst. The condemned men were George Stroud, convicted of his wife's murder at Concord, and Robert Hudson, for the murder of a fellow convict at the General Hospital in Macquarie Street. The hangings occurred "in the gaol yard" within the prison walls and was open to the public, attended by "between five and six hundred persons". The prisoners "appeared to suffer but little in their last moments".

In October 1841 Green was living at Newtown, south-west of the city centre. In 1842 the hangman was given permission to build a cottage, at his own expense, on land adjoining Darlinghurst Gaol. The structure he built at that location became his residence for about ten years. The building was a white-washed hut outside the eastern wall of the gaol, at the location later named Green Park (after James Green, alderman for the area from 1869 to 1883).

At Darlinghurst Gaol on 8 November 1842 Green and his assistant executed four prisoners – George Beavor, John Jones, Henry Sears and Nicholas Lewis (alias Head) – all of whom had been convicted of piracy and murder at the Norfolk Island penal settlement. Temporary gallows had again been erected in the gaol-yard, but on this occasion the executions were not open to the general public. Persons who wished to attend required a written order from the Sheriff, the visiting magistrate or the Governor of the gaol. The journalist describing the event for The Colonial Observer newspaper commented: "We are glad to say that the execution was more private than hitherto... the more private such disgusting and demoralising spectacles are made, the better for the morals of the community".

Green's convictions at various times did not interfere with the performance of his duties as hangman. In October 1843 Green was being held in custody on charges of "malicious destruction of Property" and "a violent assault on a female named Barrett". Proceedings against him in the Police Court were postponed for twenty days "as his services are required at Maitland, Newcastle, and Port Macquarie". During the period of 17 to 24 October 1843, four judicial executions were carried out by Green under the supervision of Henry Keck, the Governor of Darlinghurst Gaol.^{[D]}

- The bushranger Benjamin Harris was hanged at Newcastle on 17 October 1843 for the murder of Constable John Rutledge at the 'Merton' estate near Denman.
- Two indigenous men named 'Harry' and 'Melville' were executed on 18 October 1843 "in the front of the new gaol wall" at East Maitland. They had been convicted at the Maitland Assizes of "the wilful murder" of an infant named Michael Keoghue at 'Stanhope' station near Maitland.
- An Aboriginal man named 'Therramitchie' was hanged on 24 October 1843 at Port Macquarie. He had been convicted at the Maitland Circuit Court for the murder of John Pocock, resulting from a confrontation between three farm-workers and a party of Aborigines in February 1837 on McLeod's farm at 'Cogo', during which another man named Somerville was also killed.

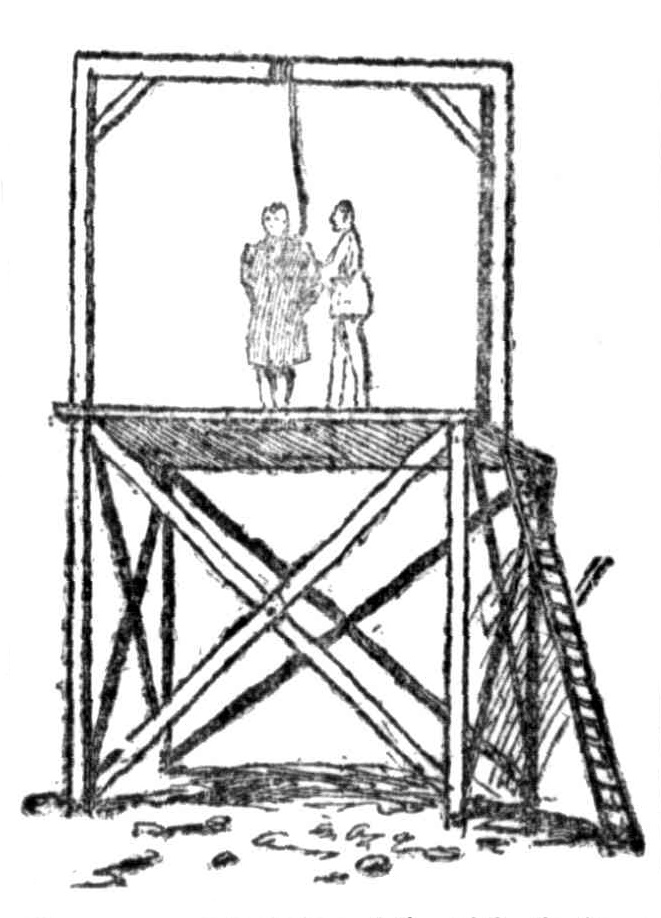
An illustration depicting the scaffold erected outside Darlinghurst Gaol for the public execution of John Knatchbull in February 1844.

After returning to Sydney, Green was convicted on 4 November 1843 of assault in the Sydney Court of Quarter Sessions and sentenced to one year of imprisonment.

The first public hanging outside the walls of Darlinghurst Gaol was in February 1844 when John Knatchbull was executed for the brutal murder of Ellen Jamieson. The gallows were located in Forbes Street, near the north-west wall of the gaol. The execution, on the morning of 13 February 1844, was witnessed by "crowds of men, women and children". Military and police constables formed a ring around the scaffold, "which had been erected some days previous". The execution proceeded in a methodical manner: "After ascending the gallows, it took but little time on the part of the hangman to adjust the rope, which, having been done, the bolt was drawn, and the wretched culprit launched into eternity". Knatchbull's death, however, was less efficient. With a drop of ten feet, it was assumed his death "would be instantaneous; but owing to a slight disarrangement of the rope, at least two minutes elapsed before life was extinct".

In April 1846 Green travelled to Newcastle for the execution of William Shea, convicted of the murder of Andrew Menzies at Hillsborough, near Maitland. Shea was executed on April 17. A subsequent newspaper report claimed that after the execution Green "was walking on the sands of Newcastle" when he met Shea's widow and entered into conversation with her. He told the woman "it was a source of pride to him, to be able to state, that he so cleverly placed the knot, that Shea died almost momentarily and without a struggle". The hangman added that he "had never made a more complete job, and begged her, therefore, to lay aside all feelings she might entertain as to Shea's suffering". The article stated that afterwards "Mr. Green and Mrs. Shea took tea together and a ball", adding the commentary: "this is another instance of the morality of executions, and their effects on society".

Thomas Worrall worked as Green's assistant until his death in July 1846. Worrall died on 16 July 1846 at Darlinghurst Gaol, after serving as assistant hangman for nearly twenty-five years. Records indicate that Worrall was aged about 70 years when he died, although a newspaper report of his death stated that he was in his eighty-second year and died of "debility consequent on old age".^{[E]} After Worrall's death Green carried out the duties of public executioner without an assistant.

==== Drunkenness and bungled hangings ====
In January 1847 Green was briefly dismissed from duty by Henry Keck, the Governor of Darlinghurst Gaol, for intoxication and "gross insolence". In a letter to the Sheriff about the matter, Keck wrote: "Should his services be required it will be easy to procure another [hangman] or he may again be reinstated and his present dismissal serve as a warning to him to conduct himself better for the future". Green's pay was stopped for twenty-three days. He was reinstated after he offered an apology, though his petition to have his pay reimbursed was rejected.

In October 1848 Green travelled to Newcastle for the execution of Patrick Bryan, convicted of the murder of Eliza Neilson, the wife of Bryan's former employer. Bryan was executed upon gallows erected in a public place near Newcastle Gaol. On the scaffold the condemned man proclaimed his innocence. Green adjusted the rope prior to the trapdoor being released; as he dropped the prisoner moved his head and "the knot of the rope slipped under his chin", as a consequence of which "his neck was not dislocated" by the fall. Bryan died by slow strangulation: "The unfortunate man thus remained hanging in the greatest agony for thirteen minutes, beating his breast with his hands, and ejaculating 'Oh! my God!'". Cornelius Prout, the Under-Sheriff, sent Green up a ladder on two occasions to attempt to hasten the process. The executioner "jammed the knot under the chin, and also laid hold of the end of the rope with his weight upon Bryan". After those witnessing the prisoner's agonising death began to show their displeasure, the Under-Sheriff addressed them, "to the effect that it was a melancholy sight, but that it was the unfortunate man's own fault by moving his head".

In November 1848 Green travelled to Bathurst for the execution of Charles Mackie, convicted of "carnally knowing a child under ten years of age". At nine o'clock on the morning of 10 November the gates of the Bathurst Gaol were opened for the public to attend Mackie's execution. It was reported that "a large number of persons assembled" to witness the hanging, "including a great many women and children". However, the hanging did not go as planned. On the scaffold the cap was pulled over Mackie's face, "the fatal signal was given" and the trapdoor was opened. When Green had calculated the length of the rope, he determined a fall of eleven feet, "but made no allowance for its stretching". After the fall Mackie's feet were seen to touch the ground, "and the body partially rebounded". Green then procured a pickaxe and shovel to "dig a hole beneath the feet of the wretched being, so that he might swing upon the rope". The "convulsive motion of the muscles" of the condemned man continued for a quarter of an hour after the drop, causing "a great sensation among the bye-standers". The journalist for The Bathurst Advocate newspaper expressed certainty that the condemned man's neck had been dislocated by the fall "and that the miserable man was almost immediately insensible to pain". However the "revolting spectacle" roused considerable "public indignation"; it was reported that "a great deal of excitement was caused in the minds of the people by beholding the feet of the man touching the ground, and to this hour it is a prolific source of conversation, and in some cases of malediction against the executioner".

Court and gaol records indicate that Green served several short gaol terms for "protection": two months from February 1849 and fourteen days in July 1850.

In late October 1849 Green, accompanied by Under-Sheriff Prout and a police constable, travelled by the mail coach to Bathurst for the execution of Patrick Walsh, convicted of the murder of Benjamin Fox. The hanging took place on 26 October, on a scaffold erected in front of Bathurst Gaol. The crowd who witnessed the event was estimated to number from six to seven hundred, with a number of police troopers taking up position within the semi-circle formed by the spectators. In contrast to the bungled hanging of Mackie at Bathurst in November 1848, on this occasion the execution of Walsh proceeded efficiently. The Bathurst Free Press reported that Walsh's sufferings "were no doubt considerably abridged", with the "depth of fall having in all probability snapped the spinal cord".

Green was sent by steamer to Brisbane to carry out the executions of Jacob Wagner and Patrick Fitzgerald, convicted of the murder of James Marsden near Maryborough in May 1850. Wagner and Fitzgerald were hanged on 8 July 1850 from a temporary scaffold erected in front of Brisbane Gaol, in a position "but a few feet of the path ordinarily used by passengers in a thoroughfare". The spectators attending the execution "were not so numerous as might have been expected".

In late July 1850 Green was brought before the Bench "for kicking up a row with some boys on the South Head Road". Since his return from Brisbane the hangman had been "spending his disreputable money in drink, and had become an annoyance to the neighbourhood, having, through delirium tremens, lost all personal control over himself". Green was unable to provide sureties for release under good behaviour provisions so he was sentenced to fourteen days imprisonment in Darlinghurst Gaol.

The last public hanging carried out at Darlinghurst Gaol was the execution of Francis Green on 21 September 1852.

In late September 1852 Green carried out the executions of Timothy Sullivan and John Newing at Bathurst. Sullivan was found guilty of the murder of Daniel Harrington in June 1851 at King's Plains in northern New South Wales. Newing, of Chinese descent, was convicted of the murder in October 1851 of a shepherd named Hing on Brown's station on the Castlereagh River. The executions, on the morning of 30 September 1852 in front of Bathurst Gaol, were witnessed by a crowd estimated to number four to five hundred. The hanging of Newing went to plan; after the drop his body "moved only once, and almost imperceptively". The death of Sullivan, on the other hand, went badly wrong and provided a "ghastly sight" for the gathered onlookers. As a result of the condemned man's "vast weight" and the length of the fall, the rope severed Sullivan's carotid artery; "the blood gushed forth as if forced from a fountain, falling to the ground in streams, and plashing the Chinaman as he hung by his side". The rope almost severed the head from the body, also cutting the flesh of the neck, together with the windpipe, so that Sullivan's corpse "was suspended by the spine and back tendons".

In April 1853 Green returned to Bathurst for the executions of Patrick McCarthy, for the murder of Henry Williamson at Bookimbla near Mudgee, and an Aboriginal man called 'Paddy', convicted of the rape of Catherine Schmidt at Oakey Creek in the Mudgee district. The two men were hanged outside Bathurst Gaol on 8 April 1853 in the "presence of some two or three hundred souls". The account published in the Bathurst Free Press was highly critical of Green, claiming that he was suffering from delirium tremens during the proceedings. Contrary to the usual custom, prayers by the prisoners and their spiritual attendants were performed inside the gaol wall rather than upon the scaffold, as the prison authorities had determined that Green was suffering so severely "that it was considered unsafe to trust him for any length of time upon the fatal platform". The executioner's countenance was described as "ghastly and pallid" when the "mournful procession" emerged from the prison. After Green placed the rope around McCarthy's neck, it was observed to be much too slack. The hangman's efforts to tighten the rope were to no avail, until at last an attendant turnkey assisted Green to finish the job. After a considerable delay "the signal was given and Green staggered to the trigger at which he tugged repeatedly... until at length he mustered strength and steadiness enough to displace the bolt". Paddy "appeared to die almost instantly", but McCarthy's death was "more protracted no doubt in consequence of the rope being improperly placed".

On 28 July 1853 Green was imprisoned for two months under the Vagrancy Act. Later that year Green became ill and was admitted to hospital. During his absence Green's hut, by that stage in a dilapidated condition, was repaired and occupied by a police constable. In a petition sent to Governor FitzRoy in November 1854, Green requested that his property be restored to him as he had built and furnished the cottage at his own expense. However, his petition was refused.

In late December 1854 Green travelled to Brisbane to carry out the execution of Dundalli, an Aboriginal man twice convicted of murder at the Brisbane Circuit Court on 21 November. Dundalli was publicly executed on gallows erected in front of the Brisbane Gaol on the morning of 5 January 1855. A large crowd gathered to witness the hanging, including a group of aborigines who congregated on the ridge of Windmill Hill, opposite the gaol. The execution went badly wrong "in consequence of some wretched bungling on the part of Green, the hangman". The bolt was drawn to release the trapdoor and, as Dundalli dropped, his feet "fell firmly on the top of his coffin" which had been placed immediately below. A turnkey quickly pulled away the coffin, but due to the stretching of the rope, the prisoner's feet were in contact with the ground. Green then lifted up Dundalli's legs and tied them "backwards towards his pinioned arms, by the rope that passed through the pinioning". The journalist for the Moreton Bay Courier concluded that Dundalli's death "seemed to be almost instantaneous after the fall", but added that it was "a most sickening sight to behold the cool and butcher-like conduct of the hangman, made necessary by nothing but the grossest neglect".

The last execution performed by Alexander Green was the hanging of William Ryan on 28 February 1855. The execution was carried out within the precincts of Darlinghurst Gaol after legislation to abolish public executions in New South Wales had recently been enacted. Ryan had been convicted of the murder in December 1854 of his wife Catherine. On the scaffold Green adjusted the rope and drew the cap over the prisoner's face. After the drop Ryan was observed to struggle "in the agonies of death... for nearly five minutes", though the doctors who attended the execution later "expressed their opinion that he was soon insensible to pain, owing to the height of the drop and the violence of the shock". It was reported that, while the execution was in progress, "there were a number of persons, mostly females and children, gathered around the outside of the gaol but the new arrangements prevented the gratification of their curiosity".

=== Committal to a lunatic asylum ===
In late March 1855 a newspaper item claimed that Green "was disgusted" at the news of the appointment of Garrett Fitzgerald as Sub-Sheriff of New South Wales "and expressed his determination never again to exercise his hempen profession under such a dynasty". The report described the executioner as "the Thug of Sydney, Green the Hangman" and included a reference to his dependence on alcohol: "In order to enable him to perform his loathsome and horrible duties he is compelled to steep his senses in forgetfulness, or rather, to inflame himself by alcohol into demoniac fierceness".

The New South Wales Sheriff, John O'Neill Brenan, wrote to the Colonial Secretary, Edward Deas Thomson, informing him that Green was insane and requesting permission to employ an assistant to accompany the hangman to Maitland. Green was being sent to Maitland to execute John Shepherd, who had been convicted of the shooting murder of David Clarke and was scheduled to be hanged on 11 April 1855. Green and the recently appointed assistant hangman, Robert Elliott, arrived at Maitland on 8 April. There had been growing local opposition to Shepherd's death sentence and a petition for mercy was raised on the grounds that the fatal shot was accidental. Reverend Purves had travelled to Sydney to present the petition to the Governor, Sir William Denison; after consulting with the Chief Justice, Denison agreed to commute Shepherd's sentence. Purves returned to Maitland on 7 April with news of Shepherd's reprieve, the day before Green and his assistant arrived expecting to carry out an execution.

On 16 April the Gaoler at Maitland, John Wallace, wrote to Sheriff Brenan in respect of Green and Elliott, who remained in Maitland. Wallace informed Brenan that Green had been "pronounced insane" by a medical officer at Maitland Gaol and recommended that the executioner should be brought before a judge in order to obtain a warrant "for removal to a Lunatic Asylum". On 20 April Wallace wrote to the Principal Gaoler at Darlinghurst requesting the relevant form and instructions for a petition to initiate the legal procedure of declaring Green to be insane. Two local medical practitioners then certified Green "to be of unsound mind" and Wallace petitioned the Governor for a warrant to remove Green to Darlinghurst (later sanctioned by Justice Dickinson of the Supreme Court). On 30 April Sheriff Brenan sought permission from the Colonial Secretary for Green to be committed to the Tarban Creek Lunatic Asylum, a request approved on 4 May. Green arrived at Darlinghurst Gaol on 10 May and two days later he was transferred to the asylum.

On 5 July 1855 Robert Elliott carried out the executions of two convicted murderers, Samuel Wilcox and William Rogers, at Darlinghurst Gaol. On 2 October 1855 Elliott was formally appointed as the colonial hangman.

=== Final years ===
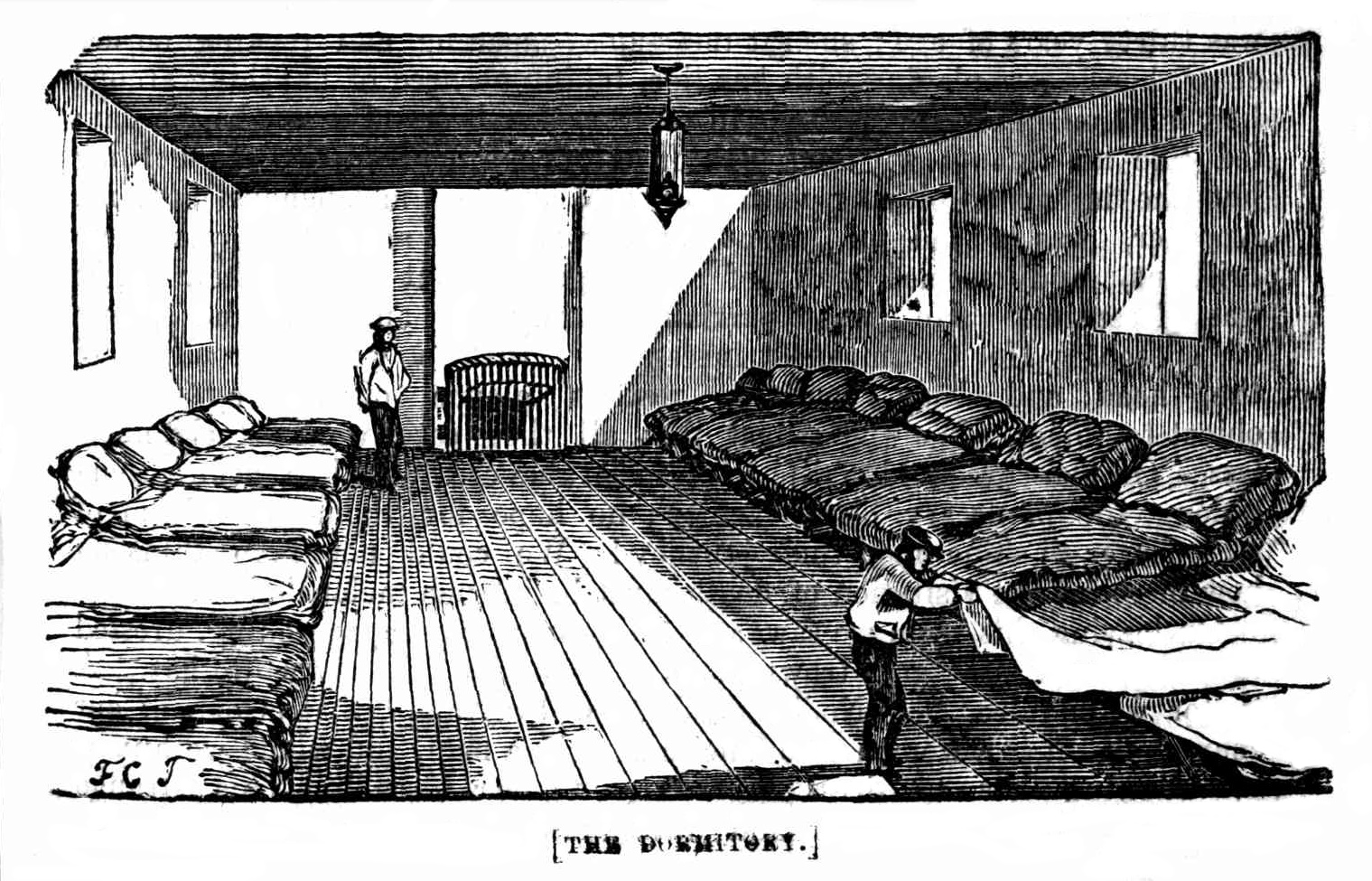
A dormitory at the Parramatta Lunatic Asylum (illustration published in 1861).

Green was an inmate of the Tarban Creek Lunatic Asylum from May 1855 to early-February 1856. On 5 February 1856 he was transferred to the Parramatta Lunatic Asylum.

An account of a ministerial visit to the Parramatta Lunatic Asylum in early August 1866 included details of an encounter with Green. The inspection of the dormitory for male inmates elicited the following comments: "The bedding was very clean, under the vigorous physical exertion of a lunatic, named Green – the hangman under the old régime... – who was energetically operating upon the floor with a mop".

It was claimed that at one time Green "used to amuse himself by hanging a number of dolls all day".

In 1877 a visitor to the Parramatta Lunatic Asylum recorded an encounter with Green as an inmate of that institution. He was described in the following terms: "His cheeks were quite yellow, and very thin and drawn, while his head was ornamented (appropriately enough) by a large white conical night cap". The writer added: "Mr. Green's age is 86, and he looks about 500".^{[F]}

An entry in the Parramatta Hospital for the Insane Medical Case Book, dated 31 January 1879, recorded that Green "is robust and very active"; he "never speaks and is fanciful about his food and is quiet and industrious". The report noted that Green "always carries a piece of cord and at every visit, he indicates by gestures that he would like to hang one of the officers", adding: "He produces the noose and points to the left ear, at the same time giving a click with his tongue and a final quiver of the feet, and plays many absurd tricks".

On 30 June 1879 Green developed a skin inflammation and suffered from swelling of the ankles and abdomen. His condition deteriorated; by August 26 he was unconscious and he died at the Parramatta Asylum on 31 August 1879, aged about 77 years. The cause of Green's death was recorded as "ascites from debility".

Alexander Green was buried on 2 September 1879 in St. Patrick's cemetery at Parramatta.

== Total executions ==
In their biography of Alexander Green, Ray and Richard Beckett made the claim that Green carried out a total of 490 executions during the period 1828 to February 1855. In her 2017 article, Pamela Harrison established that Green did not commence duties as the New South Wales public executioner until February 1834. Using the comprehensive New South Wales Capital Convictions Database as a source, Harrison estimated that 251 executions were carried out during Green's twenty-one-year career.

== Notes ==
A.Prior to 2017 the major source of published information about Alexander Green was a biography, written by Ray and Richard Beckett and published in 1980, entitled Hangman: The Life and Times of Alexander Green, Public Executioner to the Colony of New South Wales. The Becketts' biography was the main reference for articles subsequently written about Green, including his entry in the Australian Dictionary of Biography (written by Ken McNab and published in 2005). Additional research by Pamela Harrison, the results of which were published in December 2017 in an article in the Journal of the Royal Australian Historical Society, identified and corrected significant erroneous assumptions in the 1980 biography. This article takes account of the corrections detailed in Harrison's article, supplemented by contemporaneous references and other published sources consistent with the established version of events.

B.In their 1980 biography of Alexander Green, Ray and Richard Beckett claim that the scar on his face originated from a violent incident in December 1830, when Green was aboard a schooner sailing from Port Macquarie to Sydney. The Becketts' narrative states that passengers on the vessel included fifteen convict absconders being taken back to Sydney. During the journey one of the convicts attacked Green with an axe and managed to inflict a blow to his face, leaving a gaping wound. The wound healed to a disfiguring scar. In her 2017 article, Pamela Harrison discusses this unsubstantiated incident, leaving open "the possibility that Green sustained his injuries from an attack by a convict when he was employed as a scourger". The scars on the fingers of Green's right hand were possibly defence wounds received from such an attack.

C.The three men executed on the scaffold at Sydney Gaol on 6 March 1834 were sentenced to death for separate offences. William Johnson (alias 'Blue Stockings') had been the leader of a gang of escaped convicts. He and five others were convicted of "a robbery in the dwelling-house of David Ramsay at the Fish River, and putting James Farley in bodily fear therein". Edward Gill (or Gills) was an assigned servant to Donald McIntyre at 'Invermein', near Scone. He was convicted of "inflicting sundry wounds, with a sharp iron instrument, on the head and face" of McIntyre in November 1833. William Elliott had been a bushranger, apprehended in December 1834 "after strong resistance" on the Parramatta Road near Concord. In February 1834 he was convicted of shooting at James McNally, a Mounted Policeman, "with intent to kill and murder him".

D.In addition to the hangings at Newcastle, Maitland and Port Macquarie in the period 17 to 24 October 1843, there were also two executions carried out at Berrima Gaol on 16 October, which could not have been carried out by Alexander Green (due to the required travel time from Berrima to Newcastle). Lucretia Dunkley and Martin Beech were both hanged on 16 October 1843 at Berrima Gaol, convicted of the murder near Gunning in September 1842 of Lucretia's husband, Henry Dunkley. The executions at Berrima were supervised by John Weston, the former Governor of Sydney Gaol, whereas the later executions carried out by Green in the localities north of Sydney were under the supervision of the then Governor of Sydney Gaol, Henry Keck.

E.Thomas Worrall was born in about 1776. In March 1821 he was sentenced to transportation for life at the Warwick Assizes. Worrall arrived at Sydney in December 1821 aboard the Minerva.

F.Alexander Green's age in 1877 was probably about 75 years (not 86 as stated in the article).
