= George Rich =

Australian judge (1863–1956)

The Right Honourable Sir George Rich KCMG QC
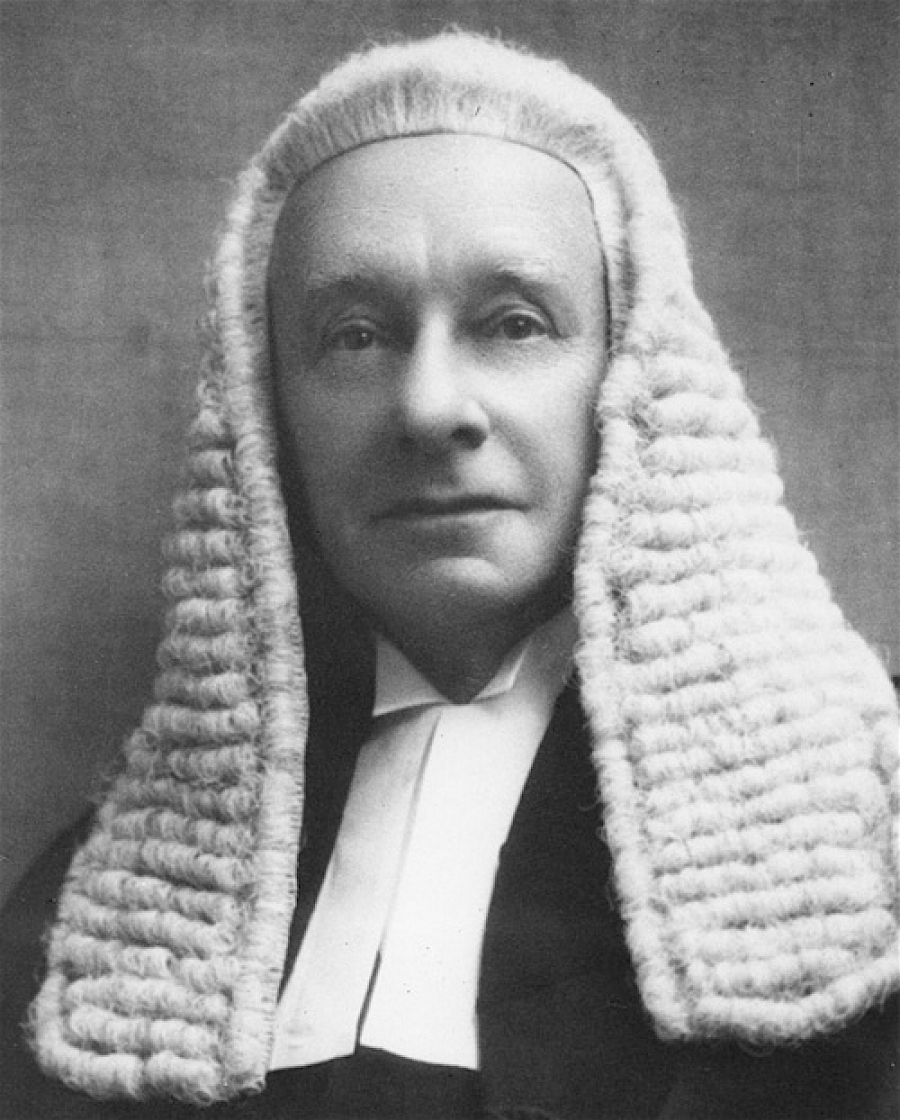

Justice of the High Court of Australia
- In office 5 April 1913 – 5 May 1950
- Nominated by: Andrew Fisher
- Preceded by: Albert Piddington
- Succeeded by: Sir Frank Kitto

Judge of the Supreme Court of New South Wales
- In office 2 July 1912 – 4 April 1913; Acting: 7 June 1911 – 2 July 1912
- Nominated by: James McGowen
- Preceded by: New seat
- Succeeded by: John Harvey

Personal details
- Born: 3 May 1863 Braidwood, New South Wales, Australia
- Died: 14 May 1956 (aged 93) Sydney, New South Wales, Australia
- Spouses: Elizabeth Bowker (m. 1894–1945) Letitia Strong (m. 1950)

Sir George Edward Rich (3 May 1863 – 14 May 1956) was an Australian lawyer and judge who served on the High Court of Australia from 1913 to 1950. He is the second-longest-serving judge in the court's history, behind Edward McTiernan. He retired at the age of 87, making him the oldest person to sit on the court.

== Early life ==
Rich was born in the town of Braidwood, New South Wales, in 1863. He was educated at Sydney Grammar School, and later studied at the University of Sydney, where he graduated with a Bachelor of Arts in 1883 and a Master of Arts in 1885. In 1887, Rich was admitted to the New South Wales Bar. Around this time he married Betha Bowker, with whom he had two sons and a daughter. Rich remained involved with the University of Sydney, founding the student magazine Hermes, the first publication by the University of Sydney Union, in 1886. He also started the boat club at the university, and in 1889 was among those who established The Women's College at the university.

== Early legal career ==
In his legal work, Rich was principally an equity specialist. From 1890 to 1910, Rich lectured in equity part-time at the University of Sydney's law school. He was also the co-author of the first New South Wales-specific textbook on equity practice. With Reginald Kerr Manning he established and edited The Bankruptcy and Company Law Cases of New South Wales. He was made a King's Counsel in 1911, and in the same year was appointed as an acting judge of the Supreme Court of New South Wales. He was made a full judge in 1912.

== High Court ==
In 1913, Rich was appointed to the newly created seventh seat on the bench of the High Court of Australia, taking up his seat on 5 April of that year. He was appointed following the resignation of Albert Piddington, who never took up his seat on the High Court but quit amid a controversy over his appointment. There has been some suggestion that Rich was a "safe" choice, because of his uncontroversial and uncombative nature, but Rich's legal ability was rarely questioned.

Rich had a long career on the High Court, not retiring until 5 May 1950. During World War I, Rich's associate was Edward McTiernan, a future Justice of the High Court, and indeed a future colleague. Rich was also a judge of the Commonwealth Court of Conciliation and Arbitration from 1921 to 1922. He was made a Knight Commander of the Order of St Michael and St George in 1932, and in 1936 was appointed to the Judicial Committee of the Privy Council. From 1940 to 1941, Rich was acting Chief Justice of Australia, while John Latham took leave to serve in Tokyo as Australia's first Minister (Ambassador) to Japan.

Rich's judgments are generally considered to be clear and concise. Some commentators attribute this more to laziness than to a knack for clarity. It was often rumoured that fellow justice (and later Chief Justice) Owen Dixon wrote many of Rich's judgments for him, and Dixon recorded in his papers that on one occasion (the case of Isaacs v McKinnon), in an appeal from the Federal Court of Bankruptcy, Rich's judgment was written by the judge whose decision was being appealed.

Rich, who retired at age 87, holds the record for being the oldest justice to sit on the bench of the High Court. This record will almost certainly not be broken, since High Court justices now must retire at age 70. It is said that, following the funeral of former justice Sir Isaac Isaacs in 1943, Hayden Starke said to Rich (who at that stage was 80 years old) "George, are you sure it's worth your while going home?"

=== 1915 Royal Commission ===
In 1915, Rich was appointed by the Fisher government to lead the Royal Commission on Liverpool Military Camp, New South Wales. He was tasked with inquiring into the administration of an Australian Army training camp in Liverpool, New South Wales, which Richard Orchard had alleged was being seriously mismanaged. Rich took up residence in the camp and interviewed a number of witnesses. His report, handed down a month after he was appointed, found that the camp subjected soldiers to "unnecessary privations and hardships" that were "not only cruel, but calculated to endanger their lives". The findings embarrassed the government, which had previously rejected any such claims, and government ministers openly criticised the report in parliament. It was the first of only two occasions on which a sitting High Court judge has been appointed to a Royal Commission – the other being Samuel Griffith's 1918 inquiry into recruitment levels. As he stated in a letter to his colleague Edmund Barton, Rich was initially reluctant to take up the appointment, but thought the "special circumstances" of the war obligated him to accept.

=== League of Nations ===
Prime Minister Billy Hughes invited Rich to join the official Australian delegation to the Third Assembly of the League of Nations, held in 1922 in Geneva, Switzerland. He represented Australia on two committees – one dealing with "legal and constitutional questions" and the other dealing with "political questions" (including League of Nations mandates). The head of the delegation, former prime minister Joseph Cook, wrote Hughes that Rich's "legal knowledge and experience were most valuable in dealing with the numerous legal points that cropped up from time to time". Rich's membership of the delegation was the first of only three occasions on which a sitting High Court judge has filled a diplomatic role. The other instances occurring during World War II, when John Latham and Owen Dixon held ambassadorships. Rich returned to Australia via the United States, where he conducted a speaking tour. He gave speeches in New York City, Buffalo, and Chicago, promoting the League's activities and criticising the U.S. for refusing to join.

== Retirement ==
Rich retired on his eighty-seventh birthday in 1950. Geoffrey Sawer has suggested that Rich delayed his retirement until after the 1949 federal election (at which the conservative Menzies government came to power) in order to prevent the Labor Chifley government from being able to appoint a judge. Billy Hughes, who had chosen Rich for the High Court as Attorney-General in 1913, was still active in politics at the time of Rich's retirement, and remained a member of parliament until his death in 1952.

Following his retirement, the members of the Honourable Society of the Inner Temple elected Rich as an Honorary Master. Later that year, he married his second wife, Letitia Strong (née Woodward); Betha had died in 1945. Rich died in Sydney in 1956, at age 93. An obituary in the Australian Law Journal described Rich as:

"...patient, helpful to counsel, wise in his sense of judgment and he had a rare but unobtrusive humour. His contribution as a Justice of the High Court to constitutional problems is by no means as insignificant as the brevity of many of his judgments might suggest, for he had the facility for expressing complex propositions in clear and succinct terms."
