= Henry Manns =

Australian bushranger

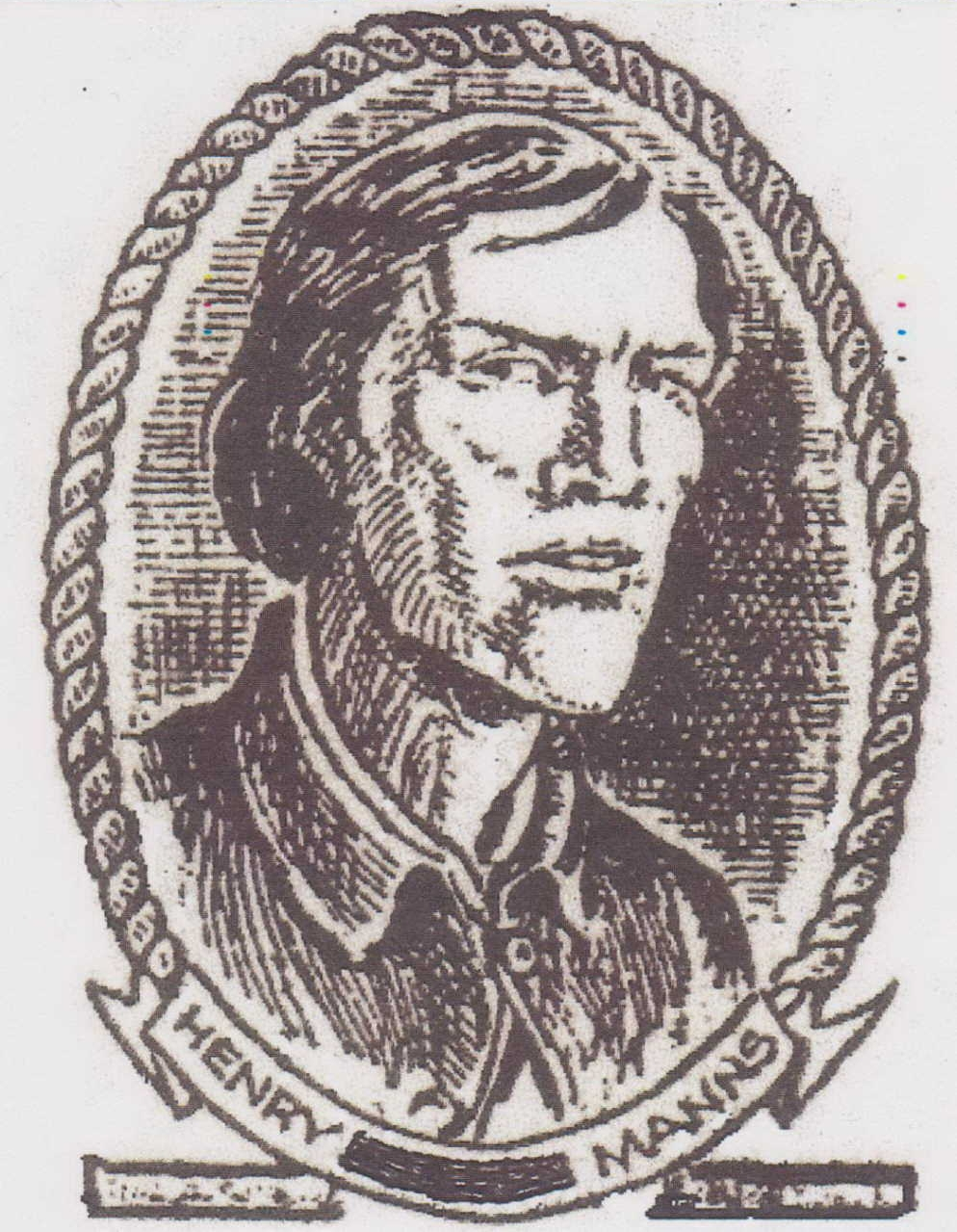
Posthumous portrait of Manns

Henry Joseph Manns (20 June 1839 – 26 March 1863) was an Australian bushranger and member of the Gardiner–Hall gang. He is best known for taking part in the 1862 Eugowra robbery, the largest gold heist in Australian history. Soon after, Manns was captured by police, tried, convicted and sentenced to death by hanging, which was carried out in a botched execution at Darlinghurst Gaol.

== Early life and bushranging ==
Manns was born at Campbelltown, New South Wales on 20 June 1839. His father, William Manns, was a convict transported from England, and mother, Mary Turner, was an Irish free settler, who arrived in the colony three years earlier. Growing up in Campbelltown, Manns left home at the age of 19 to work as a stockman. He later moved to Forbes and fell in with a gang of bushrangers led by Frank Gardiner, Ben Hall and John Gilbert. Accounts suggest that Manns was invited into the gang by Gilbert.

On 15 June 1862, Manns took part in the hold-up of the gold coach at Eugowra. They stole 2,719 ounces of gold valued at over £14,000, along with £3,700 in banknotes, shooting two police guards in the process. Following the robbery, Manns and Gilbert attempted to flee to Victoria but were intercepted by a police party led by Sir Frederick Pottinger. Gilbert managed to escape while Manns was apprehended. Later, disguised with their faces blackened, Gilbert, Hall and several other gang members attacked the police party and rescued Manns. He was recaptured in December 1862 and, alongside Gardiner–Hall gang members Alexander Fordyce, John Bow and John Macguire, went on trial for his role in the Eugowra robbery. Despite his relatively minor role and this being his first offense, Manns was sentenced to death. Public petitions, including one with over 14,000 signatures, failed to secure his reprieve.

== Botched execution ==
Manns was hanged at Darlinghurst Gaol, Sydney on 26 March 1863. When the trapdoor was opened, the noose slipped and shifted around to the middle of Manns' face. Over the next ten minutes, to the horror and outrage of witnesses, Manns convulsed, screamed and bled from his nostrils, and lifted his hands multiple times in an attempt to clutch the rope "to avoid the frightful torture he was suffering". The hangman was eventually compelled to lift Manns' body to reposition the noose before dropping him a second time.

The hangman was widely criticised for performing the botched execution, and was even alleged to have attempted to steal Manns' boots during the chaos. One of the clergymen present, Father Therry, was reported to have said that in his nearly fifty years as a priest, he had "never witnessed anything so brutal", even in the "worst days" of Australia's convict era.

Manns' body was taken to the Pack Horse Inn at Haymarket, where only family and friends were allowed to mourn. His body was later transported to Campbelltown for burial at St John's Cemetery in an unmarked grave.

== See also ==
- List of botched executions

== Bibliography ==
- Phelps, James (2018). Australian Heist: The Gripping Extraordinary True Story of Australia's Biggest Gold Robbery. HarperCollins. ISBN 9781460710234.
- Shaw, Ian (2024). The Golden Gang: Bushranger Frank Gardiner and the Biggest Gold Robbery in Australian History. Simon & Schuster Australia. ISBN 9781761424731.
