= Dundalli =

Aboriginal lawman

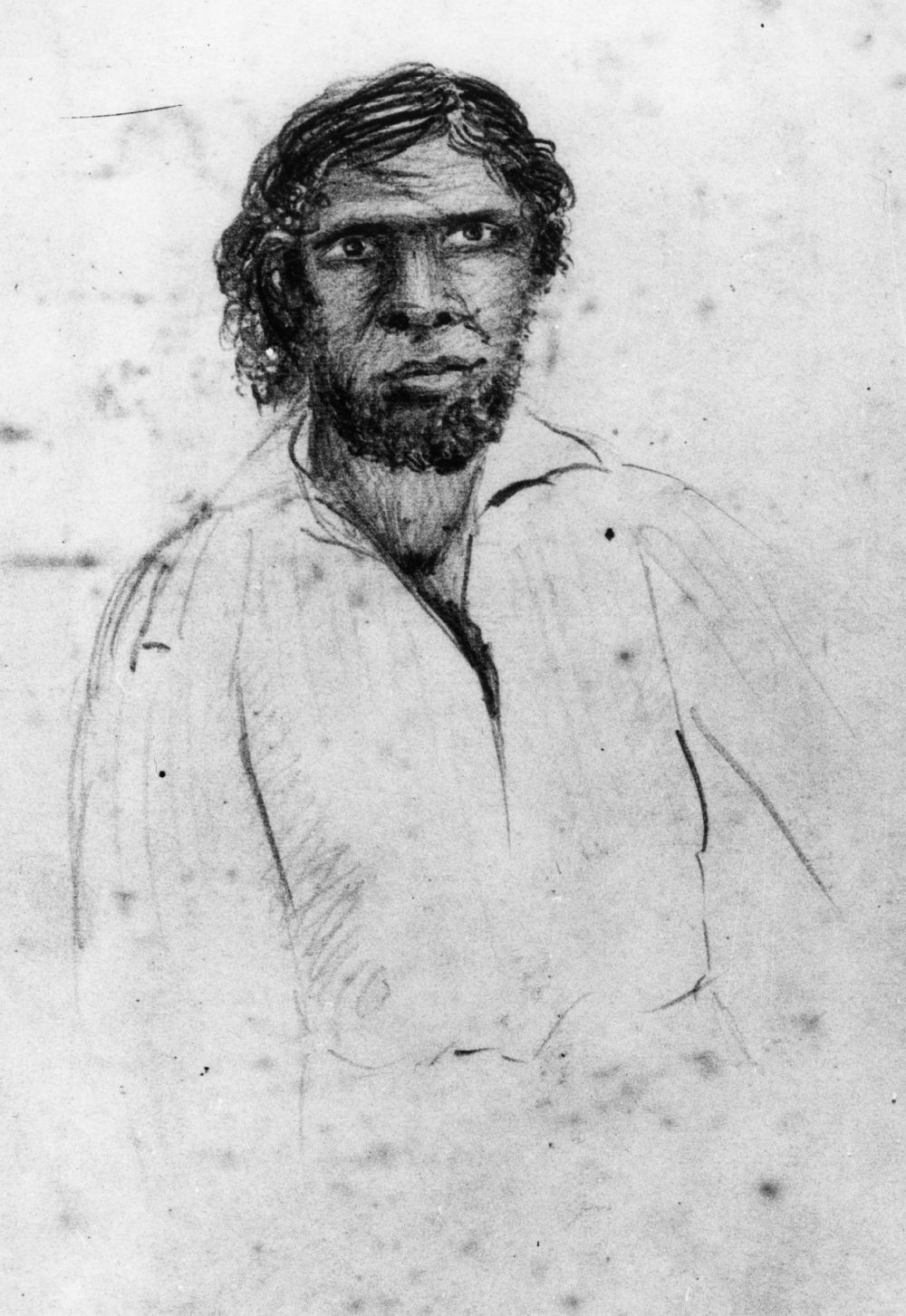
1855 sketch of Dundalli by Silvester Diggles

Dundalli (c. 1820 – 5 January 1855) was an Aboriginal lawman who figured prominently in accounts of conflict between British settlers and indigenous aboriginal peoples in the area of Brisbane in South East Queensland. Traditionally described as a murderer, savage and terrorist, he is now thought variously to have been a guerrilla leader or to have coordinated a decade-long resistance to British colonization the area. He was hanged publicly in Brisbane in 1855 by order of the Sheriff of New South Wales.

== Early life ==
Dundalli was born into the Dalla tribes, probably as a son of the Dalambara clan. Together with his brother Oumulli, he grew up in the Blackall Range. The area had a rich regional economy, with fertile ranges spread out over areas of spectacular scenery, with waterfalls plunging into deep gorges. These uplands of the Glass House Mountains and the D'Aguilar, Conondale and Jimna ranges were the homelands of the Dalla, who spoke a language closely related to Kabi Kabi. His name Dundalli was that taken on his initiation into full tribal status, and meant wonga pigeon. His brother Oumulli's name meant "breast", which may also refer to the same species of pigeon. (Note: The Wonga pigeon has a distinctive and striking V sign on its breast) Dundalli grew to be very tall, and the judge at his trial recorded that he was "the largest man I ever looked upon", well over 6 feet (1.8 m) tall. (Note: One of the blacks poisoned at the Myall Creek Massacre in 1838 was said to be 6 ft 7 in high.)

== 1840–1854 ==
Dundalli together with his fellow clansman Anbaybury was selected to lead a Dalla delegation which was organized to treat with German missionaries at Toorbul in order to invite them to set up an outpost in Dalla country. In June 1842 Carl Wilhelm Schmidt, with nine Aborigines, had explored the country round the Bunya Mountains, and had reported on the practice of squatters using gifts of flour laced with strychnine to local natives in order to clear out Aborigines in area beyond the confines of areas where settlement had been authorized. The encounter took place in August 1841. The two missionaries in question were J. P. Niqué and A. T. W. Hartenstein who, with several others, (Note: five married artisans, Ambrosius Theophilus Wilhelm Hartenstein (1811–1861), Johann Gottfried Haussmann (1811–1901), Johann Peter Niqué (1811–1903), Franz Joseph August Rodé (1811–1903), Johann Leopold Zillmann (1813–1892), and four single artisans, August Albrecht (b.1816), Ludwig Dögé, Friedrich Theodore Franz (1814–1891) and Johann Gottfried Wagner (1809–1893)) had trekked north from Brisbane as part of a lay mission recruited by John Dunmore Lang to work in the Moreton Bay area. They set up their mission 6 miles north of Nundah on Turrbal lands in 1838. Sometime around the middle of the 1840s, perhaps around Cambayo's spearing of a shepherd in 1843, Dundalli was adopted by the Djindubari people, the traditional owners of Bribie Island and he moved over to that area. Connors dates to this period the transformation of the Djindubari from generous hosts to wandering or displaced Europeans who found themselves in their midst, to jealous guardians of their prerogatives as owners of the resources of their island. Warrants for his arrest began to be issued in 1846.

== Background to his arrest and trial ==
- 1840–1841 A pastoral rush for land to squat begins as the northern districts were opened up to free settlement.
- 1841 June–August. Evan MacKenzie establishes a station on the western edge of Dalla territory; John Balfour sets up his Colinton station on Wakka Wakka lands; Frederick and Francis Bigge develop their Mount Brisbane station on Yaggera country; and the Archer brothers get a lease of their Durandur run on Dalla land.
- 1841 September. Dalla or Yaggera men kill sheep and raid stock, measures consistent with minor punishments for encroachments on tribal lands.
- 1842 January. the Kilcoy massacre, killing from 30 to 60 aborigines near MacKenzie's station with rations that had been laced with poison.
- 1842 June. Dundalli meets John Gilburri Fahy, an escaped Irish convict from Armidale.
- 1842 May. A huge gathering of traditional tribal landowners convened at Tiaro to discuss measures to be taken in response to the murders of relatives from 9 to 10 tribes at Kilcoy. (Note: Two convict runaways, David Bracewell and James Davis, who spent 17 years with his adoptive tribe persuaded them not to kill the explorer Andrew Petrie at the time as he was not responsible, having arrived in the area by sea, as opposed to the shepherds who had distributed the poison, who had come up to the area by an inland route. The Aboriginal practice was to confine retribution to families directly involved in hurting their own.)
- 1843 March. A Djindubari, Cambayo, with Dundalli present, spears a Durundur station shepherd.
- 1843 July. Gubbi Gubbi men kill 4 shepherds at the Eales station established on their country on the Mary River.
- 1844 November. Another large intertribal pullen-pullen was celebrated on the Logan River near Brisbane and soon after a shepherd at Kilcoy was attacked.
- 1845 Early March. A large pullen-pullen was assembled in the vicinity of Brisbane.
- 1845 March. A week after the preceding, a lay pastor, John Hausmann, was wounded in an attempt on his life, at Redcliffe. The attack was carried out by a Ningy Ningy man called Trimberri, with several other clansmen. Connors thinks that Dundalli may have enlisted these tribesmen to carry out a delayed ritual payback attack possibly linked to the Kilcoy massacre which had affected Ningy Ningy people.
- 1846 October, as Gubbi Gubbi, Dalla, Djindubari, Turrbal and perhaps Undanbi tribesmen returned from the pullen-pullen, a large number launched an attack on Gregor's homestead, established on the southernmost edge of the Gubbi-speaking territory. Mary Shannon and her employer Andrew Gregor were murdered though the aborigines spared the Shannon's 3 children and a resident half-caste. The witnesses were Shannon's 5 year- old daughter Margaret and Ralph Barrow, a 10/11-year-old half-caste.
- 1846 November. White sawyers enticed into an ambush and then shot a Turrbal chief called Yilbung (Millbong Jemmy) in the head at Doboy Creek. He had been rumoured to be involved in the Gregor killings, and died on the dray as he was being transported back to Brisbane. This body was not returned to his kin, whose custom was to prepare and then conserve the bones of the deceased. Rather he was then beheaded so a cast could be made of his head. Aboriginal witnesses later connected him to the Gregor episode.
- 1846 December. Shortly after the Gregor attack, another large-scale pullen-pullen - attendance was estimated to range between 3 and 4 hundred people- was convened near Brisbane, at York's Hollow. Some men believed to be involved in the Gregor station killings participated. Connors conjectures its function may have been to cap the process of retaliation. The police, alerted to the presence there of one of the suspects, a certain Jacky Jacky, raided the camp and shot him several times in the back. A bystander was also shot three times in the leg. The aborigines, including the elderly and children, were put to flight, their possessions looted and the campsite burnt. This was taken to be a reprisal by whites. No evidence was forthcoming for Jacky Jacky's complicity, and the whites involved were never arraigned and, together with a further unofficial reprisal, led to the extension of the inter-racial hostilities for another eight years.
- 1847 September 10. 3 sawyers, James Smith, William Waller and William Boller, were attacked by Gubbi Gubbi and Djindubari men at the Pine River on the Griffin's Whiteside station. Boller died immediately, while Waller, who together with Smith managed to make their way back to Brisbane, died the following day. The witness, James Smith, was an illiterate ex-convict who at the inquest could only identify a Gubbi man as present. (Note: The Commissioner for Crown Lands wrote:'As they were sawyers, a class of men but too apt to give provocation it is difficult to say who may have been the aggressors'.)
- 1848 May. Dundalli's brother Oumulli is killed after being arrested in a night-time raid on an Aboriginal camp. His ankles had been shackled by his captors, an ex-convict, Eugene Doucette of Stradbroke Island, and a Nunukul native of that island, Bobby Winter, who also bound Oumulli round the arms and neck. Oumulli died of strangulation while being draggled over to the Brisbane police. The Nunukul, who appear to have manipulated the police to obtain revenge against Dundalli, were traditional enemies of Dundallis's adoptive tribe, the Djindubari, and the death may possibly be as much as instance of tribal payback as of the application of European law.
- 1849 July. A Moreton Bay fisherman, the elderly Charles Gray, was killed on his ketch, Aurora near Bribie Island by several Djindubari, according to a survivor John Boddin. Gray had assaulted a 12 to 15-year-old native lad the day before. The Commissioner of Crown lands again judged that this was an instance of the execution of native customary law, noting that Gray's death was 'from the known character of the man..probably occasioned by his own misconduct.' Dundalli was also blamed for his death. (Note: Petrie, who later employed the 3 blacks involved and testified to their good character, gave the following native version of the incident: "Gray used to go to Bribie with a cutter for oysters; he had a blackboy as a help when gathering the oysters on the bank, and he imagined this boy wasn't fast enough in his work, so beat him rather unmercifully, being blest with a bad temper. The boy escaped and ran away from the oyster bank, swimming to the island, and he told the blacks of his ill-treatment. They were worked up to resentment, and went across and killed Gray. Father says of the latter: 'I knew poor old Gray well; he was a very cross old man, and many a slap on the side of the head I got from him when a boy.'")
- 1851 June. A Gubbi Gubbi man and ally of Dundalli's, Mickaloe, was captured by native police at Wide Bay and incarcerated in Brisbane for suspicion of involvement in the killing of the Pine River sawyers.
- 1851 July. Dundalli challenged the naturalist Frederick Strange who had been collecting specimens in the Moreton Bay area, to engage him in hand to hand combat. This may have been a response to Mickaloe's arrest, or may relate to suspicions that Strange's presence in the area veiled an intention to arrest him, or that the naturalist was intruding on Bridie Island. (Note: Mickaloe was sentenced to death on 14 November 1851.)
- 1852 April. Two survivors from the shipwreck on Cato's Reef near Keppell Bay of the Manilla-bound "Thomas King", Dr Hyslop and a sailor by the name of Smith, were killed on the Cooloola coast at Wide Bay, to where they and several others had sailed in search of relief. Gubbi Gubbi Dulingbara clanspeople robbed them, perhaps for trespass or more probably in retribution for word Mickaloe was to be hanged. (Note: After stealing the party's effects, the Dulingbara men made a gesture indicating someone being hanged from the neck.) When Mickaloe's brother Burra got word of his brother's death sentence, he and some others returned and clubbed the two to death north of Mount Coolum. Two other members of the party, Captain Walker and seaman Sherry, managed to reach Brisbane with the assistance of a Caloundra native woman who canoed them to Bridie Island. They were then helped by the Ningy Ningy in Toorbal, who guided them to Brisbane. A rescue party in June reported that native informants had told them Burra had revenged himself on Hyslop and Smith, and that the other men had died in the meantime of starvation and exposure. Quarrels broke out in the tribes over what began to appear like a revenge without due cause when the blacks who led the survivors to Brisbane came back to report that Mickaloe had been reprieved on 10 January 1852. (Note: Mickaloe was released from custody on 26 May 1852.)
- 1852 June? A large party of blacks, including Mickaloe and Stinkabed, pillaged Mrs Cash's station and a surveyors' encampment nearby in the Pine River area. Tribal elders present in the assault, among them Dundalli, were credited with ensuring that none of those whose goods were rifled were harmed. The otherwise hostile newspaper the Moreton Bay Courier reported that Dundalli had personally intervened to save Mrs. Cash's life.
- 1852 June. Michael Halloran, a shepherd on McGrath's Pine River station, was killed by a small group of blacks, among whom was Mickaloe, and another of Dundalli's allies, Billy Barlow. Throughout 1852 – 1853 numerous natives were being arrested for presumed involvement in the Gregor killings.
- 1853 The Ningy Ningy attacked Thomas Dowse and his sons as they tried to establish a station on land they purchased at Sandgate.

In the wake of these incidents Dundalli's reputation as a ringleader complicit in such attacks grew legendary proportions. None of the witnesses could finger Dundalli as a direct participant in the assaults at Durundur, on Hausmann or at Gregor's homestead, but all claimed that he had been present at each respective incident. According to Libby Connors, these rumours are to be interpreted in terms of the important role he assumed in adjudicating rituals where traditional aboriginal law, especially concerned with the application of the principle of talion or retribution for an injury suffered, was applied after agreement had been reached through wide intertribal negotiations.

== Arrest, trial and hanging ==
After a large pullen-pullen had taken place at Stone's Corner on the Norman Creek flats in Brisbane in December 1853, in which the Ningy Ningy and Djindubari faced off the Nunukul and Logan River Yugambeh in a ceremonial fight designed to put an end of feuding, Dundalli came back to the city, sometime in May of that year. Connors speculates that he may have thought tribal justice had secured peace at the December corroboree, which the Djindubari won, while stopping the feud when one of their own men was killed. He had not exacted revenge for his brother's death, had challenged Strange fairly, and had saved Mrs Cash, facts suggesting he had adopted a conciliatory policy of moderation. According to Tom Petrie, Dundalli had been hired by a bricklayer named Massie to fell a tree on his property in the vicinity of the present day Brunswick Street and Wickham Street. His presence in the town was revealed when a Turrbal enemy, Wumbungur tipped off the police. The trial was presided over by Roger Therry, who had been assistant prosecutor in the Myall Creek massacre, and who had gone on record affirming at the bench the rights of Aboriginals to justice. Nonetheless, in this trial, commentators suggest he was somewhat intimidated by Dundalli's huge stature and physique, his visible disdain for the proceedings and an attempt to bribe him. The evidence brought against Dundalli is now regarded as having been weakly constructed, and flimsy. The verdict, rendered on 21 November 1854, found Dundalli merited the death penalty for murder, that of the sawyer William Boller. The execution took place on 5 January, at the site of what is now the Brisbane GPO. A large number of aboriginals, Djindubari, Ningy Ningy and Turrbal, congregated at Windmill Hill. The local Brisbane constabulary had been put on high alert and many people were persuaded to leave the city in fear of hostile reactions by the blacks. A crowd of whites gathered on Queen Street to watch. He noticed Petrie in the crowd and addressed an appeal to him in his native tongue, and, sighting aboriginals, including his wife, on the farther hill, called out to them, telling them that Wumbungur had been responsible for his capture, and requested that they kill him. Others state that he called on his people to fight the colonizers. The hangman was Alexander Green, an ex-convict who had hanged 491 people over 27 years. Green miscalculated the length of rope required causing a grotesquely bungled hanging. His cruelly botched execution helped bring about an order by the British government to put an end to public execution. (Note: Blanch states he was the last to be hanged publicly in Queensland. Connors states that: 'Of the ten public executions in Brisbane between 1839 and 1859, including six of Indigenous men, none had excited this much interest from both the European and Indigenous communities.') When Dundalli was dropped through the trapdoor his feet hit the coffin below. Dundalli bounded up, the coffin was removed and Green seized his legs and tugged hard on them until Dundalli's neck snapped. Green himself was committed four months later to the Tarban Creek Lunatic Asylum.

== Aftermath ==
In the estimation of Libby Connors, 'The mystery as to why the authorities were unstinting in their pursuit of the execution of Dundalli makes more sense when it is viewed not as the legal execution of one man but as an attempt to destroy the ancient legal system of southeast Queensland'. In a memoir Therry described Dundalli as 'a man of the most savage ferocity, his crime of the deepest dye' and as evincing 'a sad and pitiful inferiority to the European mind'.

== See also ==
- List of Indigenous Australian historical figures

== Sources ==
- Blanch, Ken (2015). White Lies, Black Blood: The Awful Killing of Kipper Billy. Seagle Crime Stories. ISBN 978-0-994-31012-5.
- Connors, Libby (2005a). "Dundalli (1820–1855)". Australian Dictionary of Biography Australian Dictionary of Biography, Supplement. Melbourne University Press.
- Connors, Libby (2005b). "Traditional law and Indigenous Resistance at Moreton Bay 1842-1855" (PDF). Australia and New Zealand Law and History e-Journal: 107–117.
- Connors, Libby (2006). "Traditional Law and Indigenous Resistance at Moreton Bay 1842-1855, Part II" (PDF). Australia and New Zealand Law and History e-Journal: 1–13.
- Connors, Libby (2009). "A hanging: a hostage drama and several homicides: why sovereignty in 1859 is problematic". Queensland History Journal. 20 (12): 716–727.
- Connors, Libby (2015). Warrior: A legendary leader's dramatic life and violent death on the colonial frontier. Allen & Unwin. ISBN 978-1-760-11048-2.
- Drake, Jack (2012). The Wild West in Australia and America. Vol. 1. Boolarong Press. ISBN 978-1-921-92047-9.
- Evans, Raymond (2007). A History of Queensland. Cambridge University Press. ISBN 978-0-521-87692-6.
- Greenop, Kelly; Memmott, Paul (2007). "Urban Aboriginal Place Values in Australian Metropolitan Cities: The Case Study of Brisbane". In Miller, Caroline; Roche, Michael (eds.). Past Matters: Heritage and Planning History-Case Studies from the Pacific Rim. Cambridge Scholars Publishing. pp. 213–245. ISBN 978-1-443-80719-7.
- Meston, Archibald (1895). Geographic History of Queensland (PDF). Government Printer, Brisbane.
- Petrie, Tom; Petrie, Constance Campbell (1904). Tom Petrie's reminiscences of early Queensland (PDF). Watson, Ferguson & co.
- Reynolds, Henry (2006). The Other Side of the Frontier: Aboriginal Resistance to the European Invasion of Australia. University of New South Wales Press. ISBN 978-1-742-24049-7.
- Rusden, George William (2011) [First published 1883]. History of Australia. Vol. 2. Cambridge University Press. ISBN 978-1-108-03056-4.
- Therry, Roger (1863). Reminiscences of Thirty Years' Residence in New South Wales and Victoria: With a Supplementary Chapter on Transportation and the Ticket-of-leave System (2nd ed.). S. Low, Son, and Company.
- "WATER POLICE COURT". The Sydney Morning Herald. Vol. XXXV, no. 5474. New South Wales, Australia. 30 December 1854. p. 5 – via National Library of Australia.
