= Yilbung =

Indigenous Australian resistance figure

- Born: c. 1815
- Died: 6 November 1846; Colony of New South Wales
- Other names: Millbong Jemmy
- Occupation: Warrior
- Known for: Resistance to the British colonisation of Australia
- Movement: Aboriginal resistance

Yilbung (c.1815 – 6 November 1846), also known as Millbong Jemmy, was an Indigenous Australian of the Turrbal people who was a major figure in resisting British colonisation during the 1840s around what is now the city of Brisbane.

== Early life ==
Little is known of Yilbung's early years. He was probably born around the year 1815 and it is unclear which specific Aboriginal group he belonged to, although it is regarded he was most closely associated with the Turrbal people. He later formed strong kinship bonds with both the Nunukul people of Stradbroke Island and the Undanbi of Pumicestone Passage.

His name of Millbong or Yilbung is a reference to the fact that he had only one functional eye, the other suffering a destructive burn injury when he was a child. In multiple Aboriginal dialects mil or yil means eye, with bung or bong meaning broken or dead.

== Involvement in colonial resistance ==
According to the local colonial press, Yilbung began violent resistance to British colonisation of his lands while still a teenager. In 1832, he was allegedly part of a group of Aboriginal men who attacked and severely injured two members of a boat crew near the Moreton Bay penal settlement but further evidence for this is scant.

Clearer documentation shows that he later became involved with the Zion Hill Mission established by German missionaries at Nundah in 1838. He was initially enthusiastic on knowing the ways of the Europeans, learning Biblical passages presumably in both English and German. However, he soon obtained a reputation for theft both at the mission and at the nearby newly opened up British settlement of Brisbane.

Around 1840 Yilbung committed several robberies upon The Old Windmill, stealing bags of cornmeal. Eventually, the acting senior constable of Brisbane, Constable Thompson, was called to the mill to arrest Yilbung. In the struggle to capture him, Yilbung attempted to stab the policeman with an old knife. Thompson disabled him by hitting him on the shins with his baton and he was then tightly handcuffed and tied up with rope. A dozen British soldiers were then called to the mill, who marched Yilbung off to the jail on what is now Queen Street. He was sentenced to 25 or 50 lashes which he received while being tied to the triangles. He was released a day later.

In March 1842, Yilbung robbed the German mission of its supplies of corn, sugar and rice and feasted on this for several days with his band of followers. Later that month, he brought news to the mission of the deliberate mass poisonings of Aboriginal Australians at Mount Kilcoy which killed around 40 people. Possibly as a result of this mass killing, he became increasingly recalcitrant towards the Europeans. He openly mocked and intimidated the missionaries, challenging one of them to a fight. Finally in 1843, he and followers abandoned the missionaries altogether and became associated with the local Indigenous people who were living a more traditional lifestyle in the bush, often in conflict with the colonists.

== The Gregor killings of 1846 ==
As the British expanded out of Brisbane in the 1840s, various colonists took up land to the north of the settlement in traditional Undanbi country. One of these was Andrew Gregor who established the Forgie pastoral station around Upper Caboolture. In October 1846, around thirty or so Aboriginal men attacked the Forgie run, killing Andrew Gregor and his pregnant servant Mary Shannon. They afterwards ransacked the property. Child witnesses implicated Yilbung and several other Aboriginal men as being involved in the raid.

Official and unofficial rewards of £10 to £25 were promised to those who would 'bring justice' upon the accused. In early November, Yilbung was spotted amongst a group of Aboriginal people near Breakfast Creek. Armed settlers chased the group who fled across the Brisbane River into the safety of the scrubland at Bulimba Creek.

== Death ==
On 6 November 1846, three sawyers cutting timber in the Bulimba Creek vicinity lured Yilbung to their camp. In the struggle to seize him, Yilbung was shot in the head by one of the sawyers, Richard Bickerton. Finding him still alive, they shot Yilbung twice more, which also failed to kill him. The sawyers then threw Yilbung in a cart to transport him into Brisbane. Yilbung died around two hours later while being transported to the settlement.

Soon after Yilbung's corpse was brought to Brisbane, police magistrate John Clements Wickham announced that his death was 'justifiable homicide' and Bickerton received a £10 reward for killing Yilbung. Yilbung's body remained with the authorities and was taken to the hospital where his head was removed and boiled down to remove the flesh. A cast was then made of his skull.

== See also ==
- List of Indigenous Australian historical figures
- Dundalli
