= Darlinghurst Gaol =

Former Australian prison in New South Wales

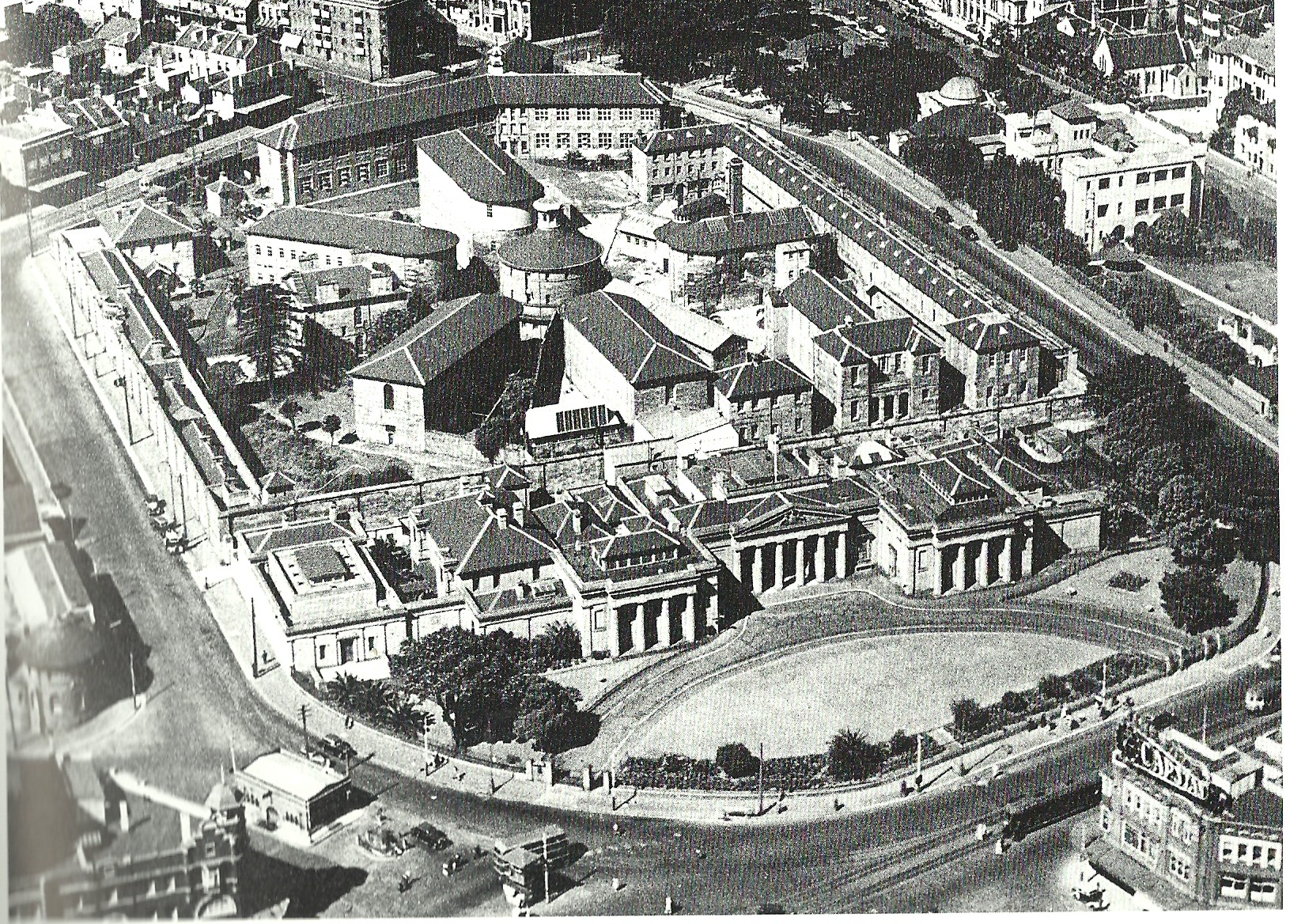
- An aerial view of Darlinghurst Gaol, with the courthouse in the foreground, 1930

- Location in Greater Sydney
- Location: Darlinghurst, New South Wales; 33°52′47″S 151°13′07″E
- Status: Closed; repurposed as an art school
- Opened: 7 June 1841
- Closed: 1914

The Darlinghurst Gaol is a former Australian prison located in Darlinghurst, New South Wales. The site is bordered by Darlinghurst Road, Burton and Forbes streets, with entrances on Forbes and Burton Streets. The heritage-listed building, predominantly designed by New South Wales Colonial Architect Mortimer Lewis, was closed in 1914 and has subsequently been repurposed to house the National Art School.

== History ==
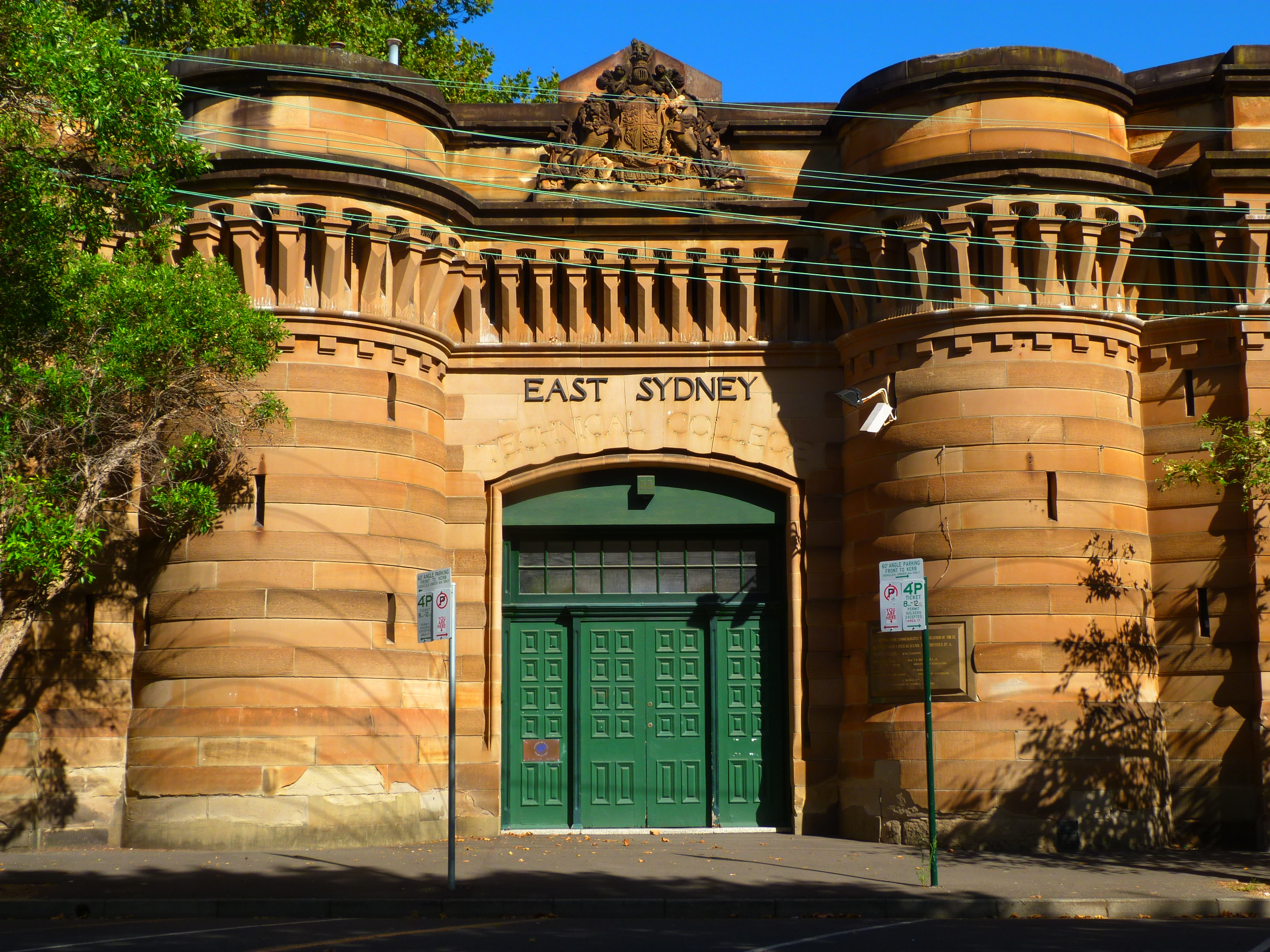
The entrance to the jail

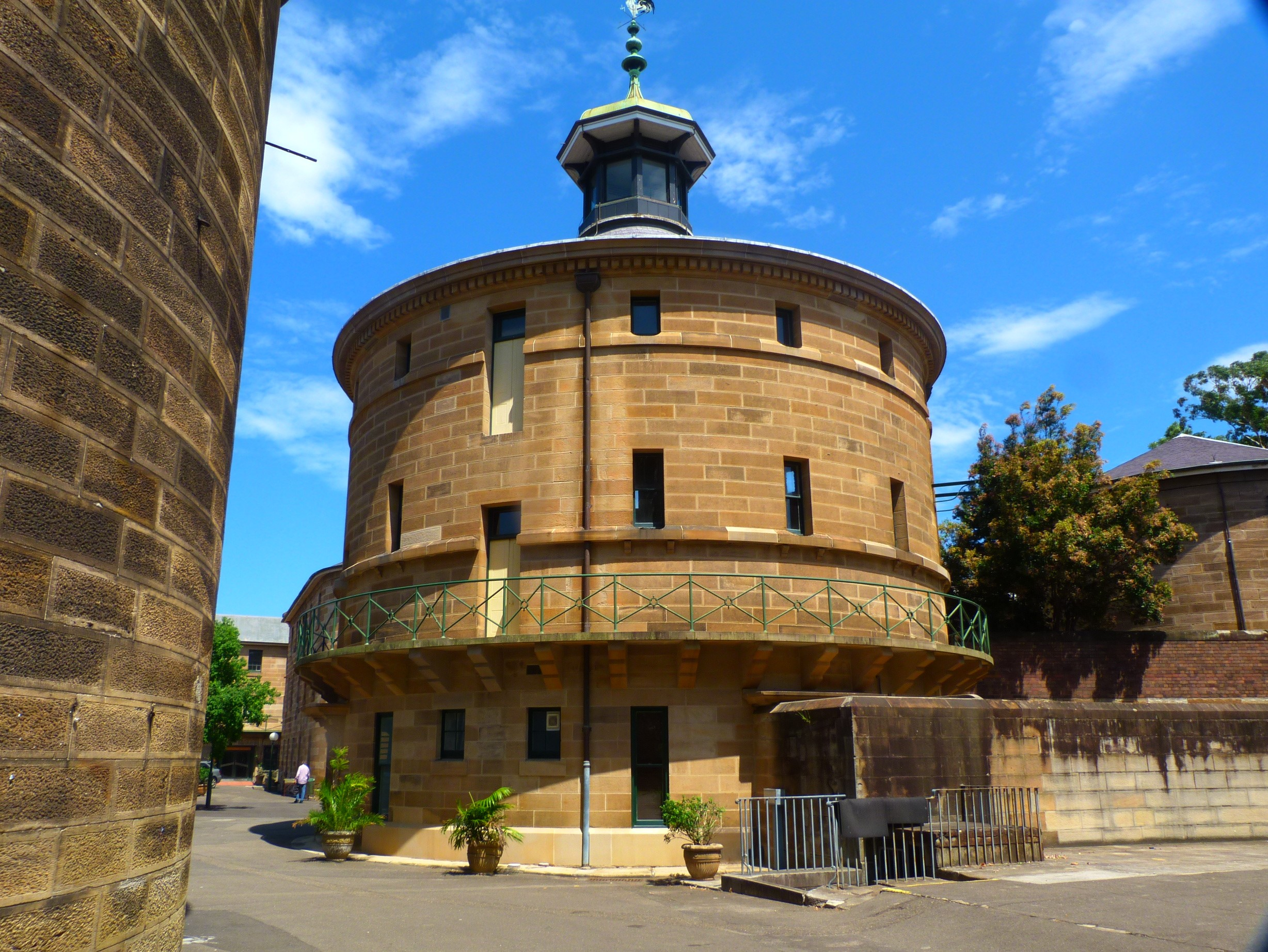
Grounds of the former jail in 2011

Construction commenced with pegging out by Francis Greenway in 1821. The Darlinghurst Gaol wall began in 1822 and finished in 1824 using convict labour, but due to a lack of funds, the site sat empty for 12 years. Construction of the rest of the complex did not begin until 1836, with completion of some of the cell blocks in 1840. The jail was ready for occupation a year later, with the first prisoners occupying the jail on 7 June 1841, some being transferred from the old Sydney Gaol on George Street.

The jail was finally completed in 1885. The main material used for construction of the jail is Sydney sandstone, cut into large blocks by convicts. Convict markings on the blocks are visible along the upper half of the wall on Darlinghurst Road. A tall circular chapel stands in the middle of the site, around which are sited the six rectangular cellblocks in a radial fashion.

Australian poet Henry Lawson spent time incarcerated here during some of the turbulent years of his life and described the jail as Starvinghurst Gaol due to meagre rations given to the inmates. The site is now open to the public as The National Art School. The last hanging at the jail was in 1907.

Hangings were open to public viewing throughout several decades. People would gather at the front gate of the jail in Forbes Street, and the condemned would be brought out to a scaffold built in front of the jail gate, and later on a platform built above the gate. The public executioner Alexander Green lived for a time in a hut outside the eastern wall of the jail, would then leave his house to the jeers and catcalls of the gathering crowd, enter the prison and do his job. Seventy-six people were hanged at Darlinghurst Gaol, but most of them met their demise on the scaffold inside the jail in a corner of E-wing. Among those who were executed were bushranger Andrew George Scott, better known as Captain Moonlite, in 1880, and the last woman to be hanged in NSW, Louisa Collins, in 1889.

== Modern-day use ==
The site was transferred in 1921 to the New South Wales Department of Education, which adapted the building for use as the East Sydney Technical College. The National Art School was established in 1922 and is now the sole occupant of the site.

The Darlinghurst Road side of the Gaol, (commonly known as "the wall") was for many years a popular place for male prostitutes to offer their services.

== Notable prisoners ==
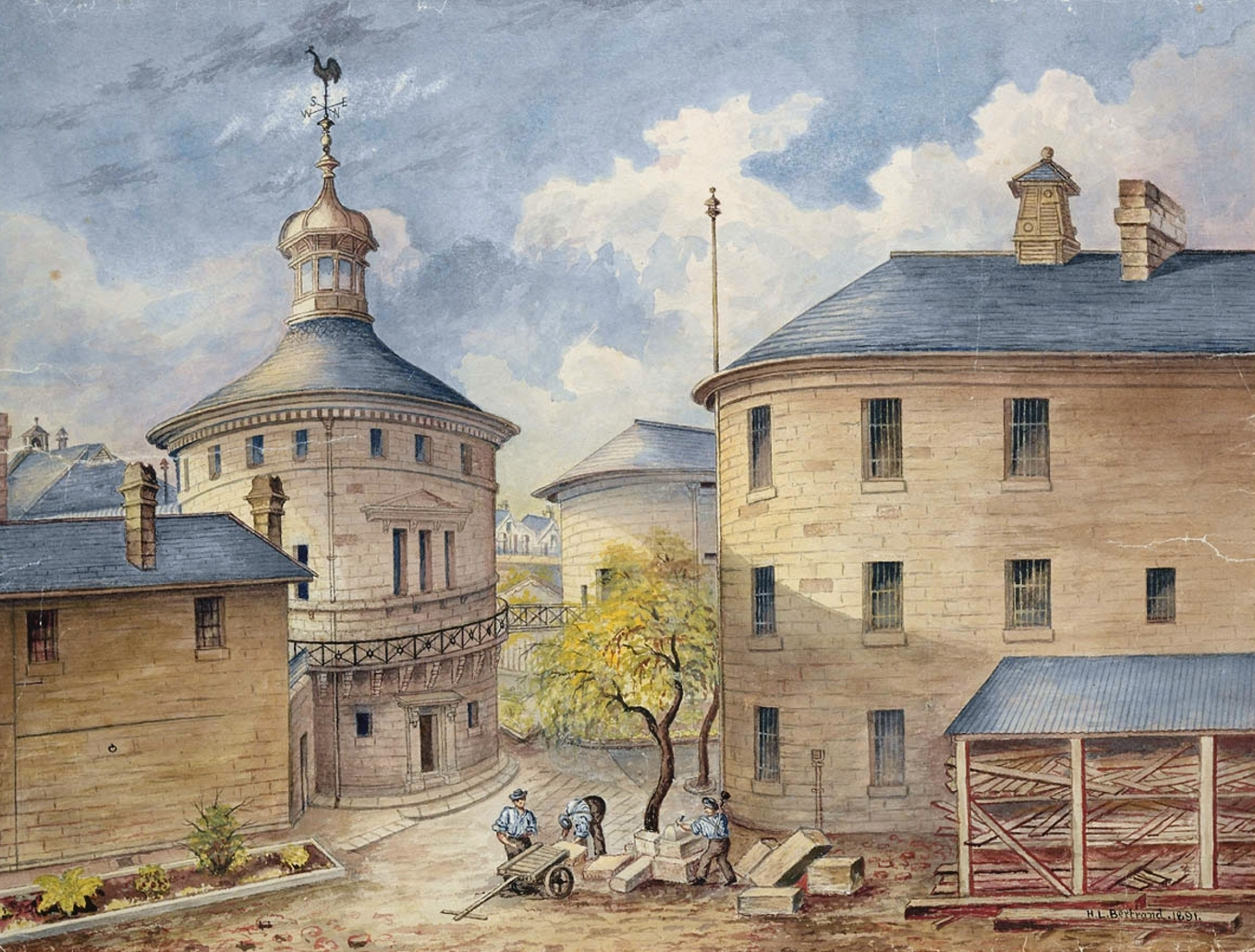
Watercolour of the Gaol by inmate Henry Louis Bertrand, 1891

- J. F. Archibald and John Haynes, co-founders of The Bulletin
- Thomas and John Clarke – bushrangers from the upper Shoalhaven in south-east New South Wales, hanged on 25 June 1867.
- Louisa Collins – the last woman to hang in New South Wales.
- Sir George Dibbs – Colonial politician jailed for a year in 1880 for slander relating to a widely reported adultery case. He was perceived by the electorate as the underdog, and his political popularity was restored.
- Albert Thomas Dryer – medical doctor and founder of the Irish National Association of Australasia.
- John Dunn – bushranger, member of Ben Hall's gang, hanged in the jail on 19 March 1866.
- Frank Gardiner – bushranger and mastermind of the Forbes gold escort robbery at Eugowra on 15 June 1862 (sentenced to 32 years, but pardoned early).
- Jimmy Governor – upon whom Thomas Keneally based his novel, The Chant of Jimmie Blacksmith.
- Henry Lawson – writer and poet.
- Henry Manns – bushranger
- Henry James O'Farrell – Irish Australian attempted political assassin.
- Andrew George Scott – known as Captain Moonlite, bushranger.
- John Vane – a bushranger who was member of Ben Hall's gang.
- Charles Kilmeister, James Oates, Edward Foley, John Russell, John Johnstone, William Hawkins and James Parry – Executed for their roles in the Myall Creek massacre on 18 December 1838.
- George Duffy, Joseph Martin, William Boyce, and Robert Read – Executed for their roles in the Mount Rennie rape case on 7 January 1887.

== See also ==
- Punishment in Australia
- List of Australian psychiatric institutions
