= Irish National Association of Australasia =

Irish association in Sydney, Australia

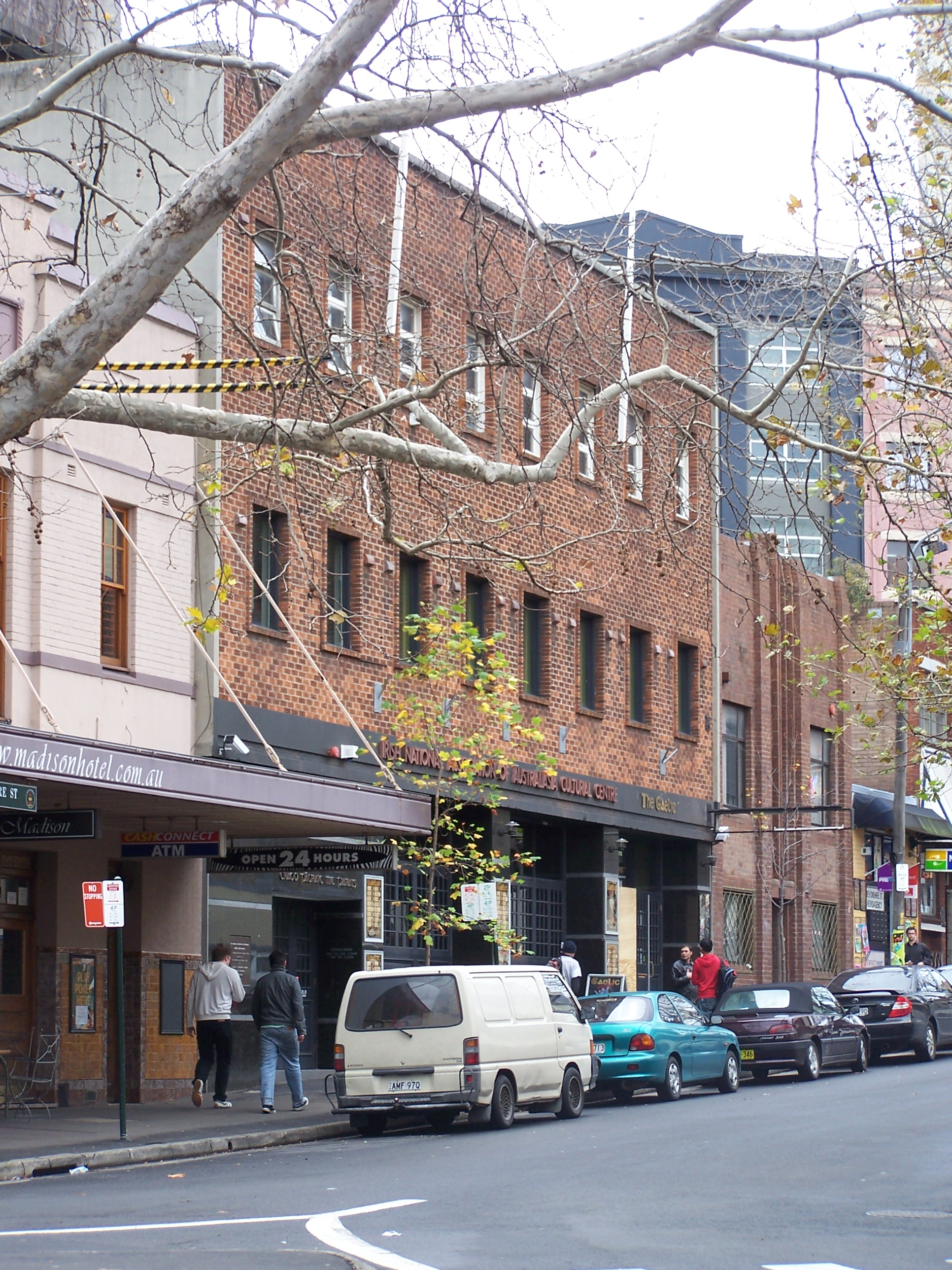
The organisation's headquarters in Devonshire Street, Surry Hills, pictured in 2004

The Irish National Association of Australasia (INA) (Irish Gaelic: Cumann Náisiúnta na nGaedheal) is an incorporated association based in Sydney. The first branch, the Pádraig Pearse Branch, was founded in Sydney in 1915.

Its current headquarters are located at INA House in Devonshire St, Surry Hills, near Central Station.

Since its establishment in 1915, the INA has worked for the Irish community and cared for the welfare of Irish immigrants in Sydney and throughout the region. Today, the INA still cares for the development of the Irish-Australian cultural activities and the welfare of the Irish people in Australia.

== History of the INA ==
=== Foundation: War and revolution ===
When the Home Rule Bill was deferred at the outbreak of the First World War, Albert Thomas Dryer, the 27-year-old Australian-born son of an Irish mother and a part-German, part-Irish father decided that it was time to rally Irish-Australian opinion to assist Ireland to achieve her national destiny.

On 21 July 1915, at a meeting in Sydney of 18 Irish people, Dryer proposed a resolution to establish an Irish National Association to serve and strengthen the Irish community in Australia, and to help preserve the ideal of Ireland's sovereignty.

The new organisation grew rapidly, organising social evenings, Irish dancing and language classes, card nights, plays and lectures. The first Irish National Concert was held in the Sydney Town Hall on 23 November 1915, and by January 1916 the INA had 211 financial members. In that month the interim committee handed over to the first elected committee, headed by Peter O'Loughlin and with Albert Dryer as Secretary.

From its inception, it was intended that the INA be a national organisation, with branches in various cities and an overall national executive. In the early days there were branches in Brisbane, Queensland and Melbourne, Victoria, but these never took off. Later in the 1940s and 1950s Dryer managed to whip up Melbourne, Brisbane and Canberra branches, but again they were short-lived. The Pádraig Pearse Branch in Sydney remains the only surviving branch of the INA.

The nationalist aims of the INA became even more important in 1916, as Dryer and the rest of the Irish community watched helplessly while Britain crushed the Easter Rising and proceeded to execute sixteen of its leaders. Whilst the INA continued its social and cultural activities, the political purpose of the association came increasingly to the fore. In a war-time British colony, already bitterly divided over the conscription issue, it was inevitable that Irish nationalists would be regarded as sinister subversives.

On Monday, 17 June 1918, Albert Dryer and six other INA office-bearers were arrested under emergency war-time regulations, and imprisoned without trial. Apart from Dryer they were Thomas Fitzgerald, secretary of the Brisbane branch, Maurice Dalton and Frank McKeown of the Melbourne branch, and Edmund McSweeny, Michael McGing and William McGuinness of the Sydney branch. The seven were accused of membership of the Irish Republican Brotherhood, and were held in Sydney's Darlinghurst Gaol for several months. Six were released on 19 December 1918, but Albert Dryer was held until 11 February 1919.

The political situation in Ireland was changing rapidly through the late 1910s and early 1920s. While the INA carried on its cultural and social activities and offered what support it could to the struggle for Irish independence, it was inevitable that the division of opinion over the Treaty would be reflected on the Australian scene.

The forces against the Anglo-Irish Treaty, including the INA, continued their political campaign in Australia with protest meetings, leaflets and newspapers, as well as collecting money to send home to Ireland. Although the Irish community was divided, the Australian Government still feared that the seditious Irish would stir up trouble.

On Monday, 30 April 1923, when two Republican speakers arrived to address a meeting at Waverley in Sydney's Eastern suburbs, they were arrested. The Irish Envoys, as they became known, were Sean J. O'Kelly (President of the Gaelic League, Sinn Féin TD for Louth–Meath, and later President of Sinn Féin), and Fr Michael O'Flanagan (Vice-President of Sinn Féin and a judge in the Dáil Courts during the Irish War of Independence). After a judicial enquiry the Envoys were deported from Australia.

Despite the Envoys incident, the Irish community in Australia was increasingly divided, and showed little interest in the INA's political activism.

By 1926, even the INA's weekly céilí (dance evening), in its premises in George St, Sydney, was forced to compete with a rival function in nearby Flinders St. Nevertheless, the 1926 Easter concert raised £120 to be sent home to Éamon de Valera. It was the last regular remittance, as later that year de Valera led the Fianna Fáil split from Sinn Féin.

=== Dan Minogue: Decline then reconstruction ===
During the 1920s, the INA moved several times, and support declined. By the early 1930s several general meetings lapsed for want of a quorum. In March 1934, a reconstruction committee was elected. The Irish community soon rallied to the support of the INA, and by the 1940s the association was entering its golden age. It was at this time that the second great figure came onto the Sydney Irish scene, Dan Minogue. A native of County Clare, Minogue came to Australia in the 1910s, and for over 30 years it was his vision which shaped the course of the INA.

The first stage of Minogue's vision for the INA, was to purchase land in Devonshire St, Surry Hills to establish a cultural centre for the Irish in Sydney. He and the Committee worked hard to raise the money to build the centre and in develop a cohesive Irish community to patronise it.

The founders of the INA were mainly working people with few political contacts, but the INA of the 1940s was dominated by those successful in politics. Minogue was an alderman on the Sydney City Council along with two other INA Executive members, Tony Doherty and Eric Drew. Minogue was elected Federal member for the seat of West Sydney. Deputy federal leader of the Australian Labor Party, and one-time Prime Minister, Frank Forde, was also a member of the INA.

One of the problems faced by the INA during the first 40 years of its existence was the dominance of Irish affairs in Australia by the Catholic Church. When the INA was formed, the inclusion of non-sectarianism among its aims was condemned by Cardinal Kelly. Nearly thirty years later, the INA again came up against the Church when it tried to use the proceeds of the 1944 St Patrick's Day sports carnival to build a hail for the Irish people in Sydney.

Proceeds of St Patrick's Day activities had traditionally gone to the Catholic orphanages and the next year the Church took over the organisation of the sports carnival from the INA. The association finally won back control of the St Patrick's Day sports carnival in 1957, and continued on for over 20 years until it revived of the St Patrick's Day Parade in 1979.

Before the Devonshire Street site was developed, the INA ran dances at St Benedict's church hall in Broadway. The Sunday night céilís were well attended, and the ranks of the Irish were swelled by new immigrants arriving under the Labor government's immigration programme introduced in the late 1940s. Strangely, there was some opposition to these immigrants from those Australian Irish who believed they should have stayed at home to build up the new Irish Republic. Nevertheless, it was the immigrants who proved to be the lifeblood of the INA through the 1950s.

One of the most historical events in Irish Australian history happened in 1948. In that year, the former Taoiseach and 1916 veteran Éamon de Valera made a controversial visit to Australia to campaign for an end to the partition of Ireland. Albert Dryer organised the Sydney leg of de Valera's visit under the auspices of the INA.

In the early 1950s, the membership of the INA was thriving. In 1951 the first annual Feis was held at the Sydney Sports Ground and over the years this was built into a national contest in Gaelic and other sports, Irish dancing and piping.

=== A new home ===
In 1953, the existing terrace houses in Devonshire Street were demolished, and as well as the céilís and other cultural events the first issue of the newspaper "Sydney Gael" was published. Other activities of the INA included an annual lecture at Sydney University, housie, Irish dancing, the pipe band, and the upkeep of the 1798 Memorial at Waverley Cemetery. Finally, in 1956, the INA Cultural Centre was completed with the help of a £37,000 loan. There was a grand opening on 16 September by Minogue in the presence of Albert Dryer, the Irish chargé d'affaires and the mayor of Sydney, and a crowd of over two thousand.

The opening of the centre led to another upsurge in activity in the INA. In those days, the kiosk on the building's mezzanine floor serviced the dances on the ground floor and the various meetings, card nights and band practices on the first floor.

By 1958, the INA activities had expanded to include an Irish trade promotion group, a recreation group, ladies' auxiliary, drama group, handball, library and céilí dances. The Victorian branch of the INA, re-established two years earlier, was still in operation. There were also ongoing events to be organised, such as the St. Patrick's Day sports, and the national Gaelic Festival.

As the INA moved into the 1960s the momentum continued. Irish goods were sold and the trade committee was flourishing, as were Irish dancing, drama, céilí, handball and golf groups. The major festivals were the interstate Feis, the St Patrick's Day sports carnival and the Easter concert.

The death of the INA's founder Dr Albert Dryer on 11 April 1963 saw the end of an era. The reduction in the number of Irish immigrants arriving in Australia and the inevitable personality clashes which had developed within the enclosed Irish community soon led to a decline in the INA's membership. One by one the national Feis, handball, card nights and other activities were discontinued. Minogue, detecting the assimilation of the Irish community and the need to compete with mainstream entertainment venues for their patronage, pressed ahead with providing a licensed club for the Irish community. It was to be Minogue's last mission in the Irish community, and he officially opened the Gaelic Club on the first floor of the INA building in 1974.

=== Reform and expansion ===
The INA continued on, surviving the changes as it had for 60 years. Nevertheless, action grew from conflict, and in the late 1970s a Reform Committee emerged from the young, more recent Irish immigrants, bringing new ideas.

In 1979, the St Patrick's Day Parade was revived, and another new era began. Soon the Parade festivities expanded to Irish Week with parliamentary and media patronage, and the INA reached out to other Irish organisations and to the Irish Australian community for support and organisational assistance.

In the 1980s, the ground floor was leased and became a cinema for a time. By the end of the 1990s, the INA took back control of the ground floor and renovated it, extending the Gaelic Club to two floors. Eventually, the ground floor was sold to become a separate venue, and the Gaelic Club continued on the first floor, holding céilís, concerts, meetings and other events for the Irish community. During the 2020 COVID-19 pandemic, the ground and first floors were redeveloped into an Irish-themed pub called Molly Malone's, with the INA retaining use of the second floor.

== Today ==
As it heads towards its centenary, the Irish National Association of Australasia still continues to work for the Irish community, holding Irish music concerts and regular dances, sponsoring dancing classes, and Irish language classes. The Association also maintains the Albert Dryer Memorial Library, containing many rare antiquarian volumes collected and donated over the decades, including a copy of the Book of Kells donated by Éamon de Valera himself. Although the St Patrick's Day Parade, the Australian Irish Welfare Bureau and Irish Language School, Sydney are now independent organisations, they still maintain strong links to the INA.

The INA continues to grow and develop in the new century, expanding its dance and music evenings and establishing a School of Irish Music in 2009. While its political activism has declined since the Independence of Ireland has become assured, the INA still commemorates the Easter Rising every Easter Sunday at the Irish 1798 Rebellion Memorial in Waverley Cemetery, over the grave of Michael Dwyer.
