= Merton (New South Wales) =

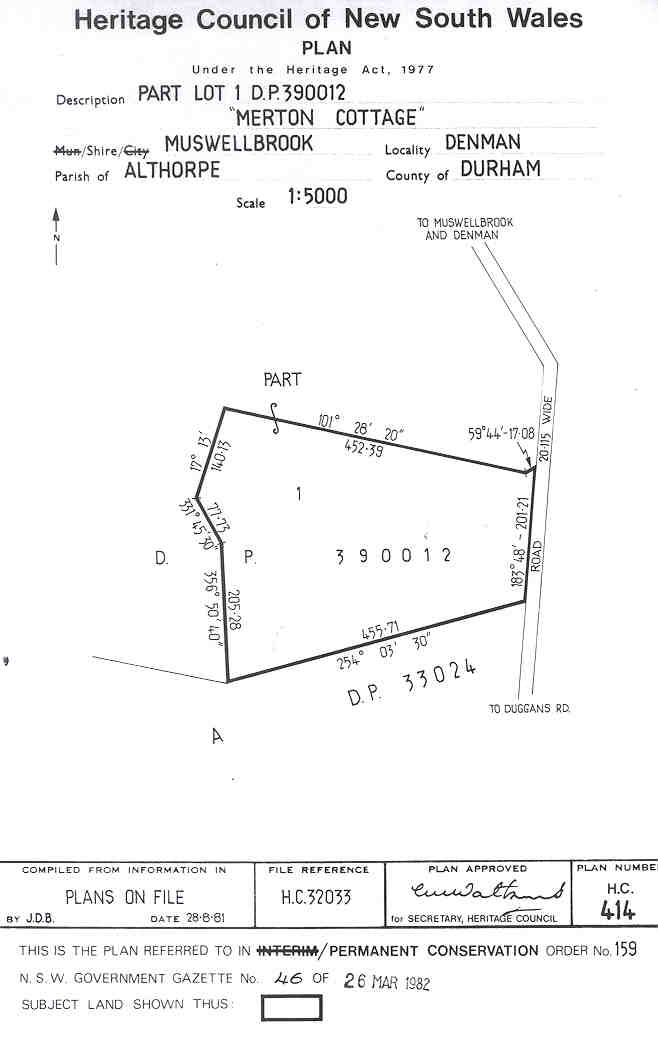
- Heritage boundaries

- Location within New South Wales Location within Australia
- 32°23′39″S 150°43′09″E
- Location: 4883 Jerrys Plains Road, Denman, Muswellbrook Shire, New South Wales, Australia

History
- Built: 1825–1910

New South Wales Heritage Register
- Official name: Merton
- Type: State heritage (complex / group)
- Designated: 2 April 1999
- Reference no.: 159
- Type: Homestead Complex
- Category: Farming and Grazing

Merton is a heritage-listed former farm, horse stud, village settlement and residence and now residence at 4883 Jerrys Plains Road, Denman, Muswellbrook Shire, New South Wales, Australia. It was built between 1825 and 1910; and it was added to the New South Wales State Heritage Register on 2 April 1999.

== History ==
Merton was a grant to Commander William Ogilvie who had served as a Midshipsman under Lord Horatio Nelson at the Battle of Copenhagen and who retired from the Royal Navy to the Colony of New South Wales.

He arrived with his wife and four children in 1825 and almost immediately applied for a grant of land in the Hunter Valley. He was allotted 1,600 hectares (4,000 acres) near the present town of Denman, and named it Merton after the house of Lord Nelson in Surrey.

The original Merton cottage built in 1826 was a small four-roomed cottage, whitewashed with an earthen floor. Later, wooden floors were laid. Room partitions were made of wooden at first, was eventually thatched. Sandstone for the cottage was quarried on the hillside behind.

This homestead became the centre of the first village in the Upper Hunter Valley, possessing courthouse, church, school, cemetery, etc.

William Ogilvie died in 1859 and the family leased the property until it passed into the White family (an outstanding pioneering dynasty) by 1875 and was owned by Reginald White in 1896 when described by H. Mackenzie in "Pastoralists and Producers". Reginald White built the second brick house which was extended at various times, particularly in 1910 for the visit of the Prince of Wales. Under the White family racehorses and cattle were bred here.

In the last thirty years it has been owned by L. Porter (about 1950), then P. Feeney and since 1986 by the Carter family. Of the many buildings to survive are Merton Cottage c. 1825 (disused) and White's late nineteenth homestead - a complex of the highest significance. The Carter family have since been restoring the property from a previously abandoned and vandalised condition.

== Description ==
The site comprises two buildings, Merton Cottage, erected c. 1825 and now disused, originally earthen floors that have been replaced by wooden flooring, with wooden slab partitions, and sandstone walls. The second building is the White family's late nineteenth homestead in the Victorian Filigree style.

=== Modifications and dates ===
There have been a number of modifications, as follows:

- 1826 – original cottage small four-roomed, whitewashed sandstone with an earthen floor.
- Later – wooden floors were laid. Room partitions were made of wood. Roof timber shingles at first, was eventually thatched.
- 1859 – c. 1880 bought by Reginald White. He built the second brick house which was extended at various times, particularly in 1910 for the visit of the Prince of Wales.

Recent timber/metal deck skillion-roofed extensions to side. Verandah frieze modifications. Some painted brickwork. Extensive demolition and restoration works in the past 10 years

== Heritage listing ==
As at 6 July 2010, historically the property is of regional significance as it was settled by one of the region's founding families, bought by the region's best known successful pastoralist, and contains evidence of the original homestead buildings. It has remained continuously in use for its original purpose. Socially the homestead site has regional significance for the descendants of the Ogilvie, Reginald White and Porter families. Scientifically it has regional significance for its potential to reveal information which could contribute to an understanding of the lifestyle of successful pastoralists in the 19th and 20th centuries and about the changes in farming in the Upper Hunter over the past century. Because of the surviving evidence of settlement by its founders, the homestead has regional rarity.

The complex (of very early settler's cottage, late 19th century homestead complete with gardens and terrace and early 20th century ballroom) is surviving evidence of progress made by two very important Hunter Valley settlers. The early cottage is one of the oldest surviving in the area. The complex occupies a prominent site overlooking the town of Denman, in a remarkable setting (National Trust classification). Its strong association with an important figure in the person of Commander William Ogilvie. One of the first Crown grantees to take up residence in the upper Hunter in 1825 (RNE).

Merton was listed on the New South Wales State Heritage Register on 2 April 1999.

== See also ==
- Australian residential architectural styles
