= Albert Thomas Dryer =

Australian medical doctor (1888 – 1963)

- Born: 1 March 1888; Sydney
- Died: 11 April 1963 (aged 75)
- Occupations: Medical doctor and supporter of Irish republicanism
- Notable work: Founder of the Irish National Association of Australasia (INA)

Albert Thomas Dryer (1 March 1888 – 11 April 1963) was an Australian medical doctor and supporter of Irish republicanism. The founder of the Irish National Association of Australasia (INA) and the Australian League for an Undivided Ireland, Dryer was a noted campaigner on behalf of the Irish community in Australia and the republican cause.

== Early life and education ==
Born in the Sydney suburb of Balmain, Albert Thomas Dryer was the son of an Irish mother, Mary Ann Cusick, and a German–Irish father, Albert James Dryer. His father died when he was young, and his mother remarried. He began his education in Singleton, New South Wales, in the Hunter Valley, where he lived with his maternal grandmother, and later in Sydney in 1896-1904, then at night schools. When he finished school he found work in Melbourne as a clerk with the Department of Trade and Customs.

In 1909, Dryer was transferred to Sydney, and entered the University of Sydney to study English literature. He was awarded a Bachelor of Arts degree in 1914, and it was about this time that Dryer's interest in Irish culture, history, and politics was awakened.

== Activism ==
On 21 July 1915, at a meeting of 18 Irish people in Sydney, Dryer proposed the establishment of the Irish National Association of Australasia, to preserve the notion of Irish sovereignty in Australia.

On Monday, 17 June 1918, Albert Dryer and six other INA office-bearers were arrested under emergency war-time regulations, and imprisoned without trial. The seven were accused of membership of the Irish Republican Brotherhood, and were held in Sydney’s Darlinghurst Prison for several months. Six were released on 19 December 1918, but Albert Dryer was held until 11 February 1919.

For his entire life, Dryer remained the central figure of the Irish National Association of Australasia, helping secure the land for its premises in Devonshire St, Surry Hills. He was instrumental in organising Éamon de Valera's controversial visit to Australia in 1948.

== Medical career ==
After failing in such ventures as book-keeping, coaching and shopkeeping, including his own Academic Coaching College, he attended Sydney Technical College, graduating with an associate degree in science and biology in 1926; and, in 1929, he passed first-year medicine at the university without attending lectures. In 1932, he borrowed money to enter medical school full-time and graduated with an M.B., B.S. in 1938.

== Death and legacy ==
Dryer died of cancer in Lewisham Hospital, Sydney, on 11 April 1963, survived by his wife and son. A devout Roman Catholic, he was buried in Sedgfield Cemetery at Singleton.

The INA's library at its premises in Devonshire St, Sydney is named in his memory.

== Personal life ==
Dryer had married Elizabeth Ellen Haynes, on 29 April 1933 at St Mary's Cathedral, Sydney. They had been engaged since 1915, but not married until then because of the insecurity of his employment. Their only child, Albert Benjamin, was born in 1934.

Dryer set up his own practice at Fairfield, New South Wales in 1940, and then moved his family and practice to Singleton after the Second World War.

According to his biographer and friend Professor Patrick O'Farrell:

Dryer never visited Ireland, but his devotion to the cause of Irish independence, and particularly the party of de Valera was constant, selfless and total. With great ability and remarkable strength of character and purpose, he was essentially a romantic idealist to whom Ireland represented all that was noble in human affairs. His high intelligence and gentlemanly disposition stopped him well short of any fanaticism, but the realities of indifference and in-fighting which afflicted the Irish cause in Australia were a source of deep disappointment and frustration to him.
