= Androcentrism =

Centering a masculine point of view

Androcentrism (Ancient Greek, ἀνήρ, "man, male") is the practice, conscious or otherwise, of placing a masculine point of view at the center of one's world view, culture, and history, thereby culturally marginalizing women. The related adjective is androcentric. The opposite of androcentric is gynocentric.

Androcentrism has been described as a pervasive form of sexism. It has also been described as a movement centered on, emphasizing, or dominated by males or masculine interests.

== Etymology ==
The term androcentrism was introduced 1903 by Lester Frank Ward in his book Pure Sociology. In his approach from biology to sociology, he argued that the life evolves from gynaecocracy to androcentrism. He wrote that "the male sex is viewed as primary, and the female is secondary", as a consequence of human evolution, but that in evolutionary biology, the female organism is primary as a means of procreation (1914, 292). After Charlotte Perkins Gilman heard him in a scientific debate, herself acknowledged his contribution in the preface to the first edition of her book, The Man-Made World; or, Our Androcentric Culture, published in 1911. Following the ideas of Lester Frank Ward, Perkins Gilman argued that women were the dominant sex and only needed men for fertilization. As with insects and plants, women were originally primary to nature. Androcentrism was a consequence of societal development "based on an irrational glorification of the trivial male fertilizing function, [which] had resulted in arresting the development of half the world.” Through this lens, androcentrism may be understood as a societal fixation on masculinity, in which masculinity is normative and all other things are categorized as non-masculine and thus other. According to Perkins Gilman, masculine patterns of life and masculine mindsets have come to claim universality while female patterns are considered deviant.

== Science ==
=== Medical education ===
Until the 19th century, women were effectively barred from higher education in Western countries. For over 300 years, Harvard admitted only white men from prominent families. Many universities, such as for example the University of Oxford, consciously practiced a numerus clausus and restricted the number of female undergraduates they accepted. Due to the latter, access of women to university and academic life, the participation of women in fundamental research is marginal. The basic principles in sciences, even human sciences, are hence predominantly formed by men. The dominance of male research participants in scientific studies across medicine and health has also been noted by scholars. The workings of how scientists research, conceptualize, and understand bodily functions demonstrate androcentric ideologies.

Some scholars express androcentric tendencies in scientific medical research. In Caroline Criado-Perez's book Invisible Women, Criado-Perez analyzes various studies and expresses how the medical institution is a manifestation of androcentric practices in research and education. A review of a US online database for medical school courses in 2006 found only nine out of ninety-five schools' courses related to women's health. Out of these nine, only two women’s health courses were considered mandatory. In addition, a 2008 study regarding recommended medical textbooks from prestigious universities across the US, Canada, and Europe found that across 16,329 images, male bodies were three times more present when representing ‘neutral body parts’ (parts of the body that don’t include sex organs) than female bodies. Criado-Perez also cites a more current review of US med school curricula in 2016. This study confirmed the ongoing presence of sex-based bias; they found minimal and haphazard accounts of women's health, specifically regarding treatment and drugs prescribed. Despite this, researchers have confirmed sex differences in all organ systems, tissues, and differences in prevalence, source, and severity in a majority of common diseases.

=== Medicine ===
There is a gender health data gap and women are systematically discriminated against and misdiagnosed in medicine. Early medical research has been carried out nearly exclusively on male corpses. Women were considered "small men" and not investigated. To this day, clinical studies are frequently confirmed for both sexes even though only men have participated and the female body is often not considered in animal tests, even when "women diseases" are concerned. However, female and male bodies differ, all the way up to the cell level. The same diseases can have different symptoms in the sexes, calling for different treatment, and medicines can work completely differently, including different side effects.

Scholars such as Caroline Criado-Perez, author of Invisible Women, critique medicine as a site for androcentrism. Criado-Perez expresses concern for lack of women's representation in overall research and studies of disease that predominantly affect women. Women make up 80% of the population who experience autoimmune diseases while only 8% of participants of autoimmune research are women. Women’s exclusion from the health and medical research continues when examining HIV. In lower/middle-income countries women make up 55% of the population of those who test positive for HIV. The inclusion of them in HIV research does not reflect this. Participant demographics show women as making up only 19.2% of individuals in antiviral studies, 38.1% in vaccine research, and 11.1% in studies that aim to find a cure.

Heart attacks, as expressed by some scholars, demonstrate how women's conformity to male symptoms impacts their access to adequate medical care. The symptoms of heart attack in women are often "described as 'atypical' versus the 'typical' male symptoms". For example, whilst women experience are similarly likely to experience chest pain, it is less likely to be their chief complaint, instead presenting with "more atypical symptoms such as nausea, vomiting, and shortness of breath." UK research suggests women are 50% more likely to be misdiagnosed after experiencing a heart attack as their biomarkers do not align with "standard" criteria that is based on male symptoms. Some researchers have viewed test dummies as another site of androcentrism. Criado-Perez discusses studies in relation to car crashes. Her findings demonstrate that women are 17% more likely to die, 47% more likely to suffer from serious injuries, and 71% more likely to sustain minor injuries in car accidents. The data gathered for car safety primarily includes test dummies molded after the average male body. Car companies are not required to test safety features on dummies modeled after the standard women's body or pregnant women's body. For pregnant women specifically, a 1996 study found that seatbelt safety is significantly less effective for pregnant bodies given seatbelts' design increases force transmission to the abdomen on impact, leading to increased death and injuries for the fetus and the mother.

CPR training is done on mannequins that lack breasts, putting women's lives at risk. The procedure is the same, so it is lack of awareness of what to do when a woman needs CPR, because training is done on test dummies based on the male body, that has deadly consequences for women.

=== Exclusion from clinical trials ===
Historical scholars who analyzed the ancient Greeks, discussed their beliefs around human anatomy which deemed the female body to be a mutated version of the male. In the West, the female genital organs were named in relation to men’s, with ovaries deemed as ‘male testicles,’ and the uterus seen as the ‘female scrotum.’ It was not until the 17th century when female sex organs received the names we know today. While there have been significant medial and scientific advances, there was a more recent setback in 1977, the FDA recommended women of childbearing age to not participate in Phase I and II of drug trials. This was policy was reason neutral and enforced whether or not a woman was on birth control, had a male partner with a vasectomy, or did not participate in procreative sex. The reason for this exclusion, as the NIH explains, was due to thalidomide, a common drug used to prevent morning sickness which resulted in thousands of births with defects and deformities due to mothers who consumed the drug during pregnancy. The NIH describes how these findings resulted in new approaches for researchers, and a cautionary exclusion of women, which resulted in a shortage of data on how drugs specifically impact women. In 1989, the NIH released a new policy that recommended researchers to include women and people with minority identities, and if they were not, they needed to include that information in the rationale of the study. This policy did not become law until 1993, with the NIH Revitalization Act, the first to ensure that women and minorities are included in clinical research.

=== Sexology ===
Sexology is a field of science, where scientists sought to examine sexual identities and the medicalization of them. Initially homosexuality was classified as a mental disorder by scientists, and classification of queerness as a mental disorder was not removed from the DSM until the 1970s. Freud was one the early sexologist who examined homosexual theories. Scholars interpreted Freud's work around the homosexual identity as a classification of social and cultural factors that led to delayed sexual development, rather than a disease that can be cured. Queer feminists scholars, such as Averill Earls critiqued Freud's theories, specifically Freud's concept of penis envy which he theorized to justify female same-sex desire. Freud surmised that female homosexuality arose due to disappointment towards the mother for not providing her daughter a penis, and thus homosexual desires arise from this biological disappointment. As Earls explained in her analysis, the conceptualization of lesbianism is seen as a defect to heteropatriarchal norms, as it attributes female same sex desire to dissatisfaction with one's genitalia and a desire for male reproductive anatomy.

Krafft-Ebing was another early scientist in the field of sexology who was critiqued by queer feminist scholars. Earls poses that his studies have male centric conclusions, as his explanations for lesbianism were rooted in women not having access to men. His findings suggest that women engaging in homosexual acts is a temporary fix to fulfill sexual desire in times or spaces where men could not, rather than out of true desire or love for the same sex. Queer Feminists scholars interpret his work as androcentric, due to the disregard of female homosexuality as a legitimate expression of sexual identity. Krafft-Ebing's work, as expressed by Earls, demonstrated how lesbianism was posed as a secondary option, still centered around proximity to heteronormativity and access to sexual acts with men.

== Literature ==
Research by Dr. David Anderson and Dr. Mykol Hamilton has documented the under-representation of female characters in a sample of 200 books that included top-selling children's books from 2001 and a seven-year sample of Caldecott award-winning books. There were nearly twice as many male main characters as female main characters, and male characters appeared in illustrations 53 percent more than female characters. Most of the plot-lines centered on the male characters and their experiences of life.

== The arts ==
In 1985, a group of female artists from New York, the Guerrilla Girls, began to protest the under-representation of female artists. According to them, male artists and the male viewpoint continued to dominate the visual art world. In a 1989 poster (displayed on NYC buses) titled "Do women have to be naked to get into the Met. Museum?" they reported that less than 5% of the artists in the Modern Art sections of the Met Museum were women, but 85% of the nudes were female.

Over 20 years later, women were still under-represented in the art world. In 2007, Jerry Saltz (journalist from the New York Times) criticized the Museum of Modern Art for undervaluing work by female artists. Of the 400 works of art he counted in the Museum of Modern Art, only 14 were by women (3.5%). Saltz also found a significant under-representation of female artists in the six other art institutions he studied.

Piano keyboards have a set size based on the hand of an average male, causing women to be 50% more likely to be injured or in pain while playing the instrument. The standard keyboard size disadvantages 87% of female pianists.

== Generic male language ==
In literature, the use of masculine language to refer to both men and women may indicate a male or androcentric bias in society where men are seen as the 'norm', and women are seen as the 'other'. Philosophy scholar Jennifer Saul argues that the use of male generic language marginalizes women in society. In recent years, some writers have started to use more neutral language (for instance, words like humanity, firefighter, and police officer).

Many studies have shown that male generic language is not interpreted as truly gender-inclusive. Psychological research has shown that, in comparison to unbiased terms such as "they" and "humankind", masculine terms lead to male-biased mental imagery in the mind of both the listener and the communicator.

Three studies by Mykol Hamilton show that there is not only a male → people bias but also a people → male bias. In other words, a masculine bias remains even when people are exposed to only gender neutral language (although the bias is lessened). In two of her studies, half of the participants (after exposure to gender neutral language) had male-biased imagery but the rest of the participants displayed no gender bias at all. In her third study, only males showed a masculine-bias (after exposure to gender neutral language) – females showed no gender bias. Hamilton asserted that this may be due to the fact that males have grown up being able to think more easily than females of "any person" as generic "he," since "he" applies to them. Further, of the two options for neutral language, neutral language that explicitly names women (e.g., "he or she") reduces androcentrism more effectively than neutral language that makes no mention of gender whatsoever (e.g., "human").

Feminist anthropologist Sally Slocum argues that there has been a longstanding male bias in anthropological thought as evidenced by terminology used when referring to society, culture, and humankind. According to Slocum, "All too often the word 'man' is used in such an ambiguous fashion that it is impossible to decide whether it refers to males or just the human species in general, including both males and females."

Men's language will be judged as the 'norm' and anything that women do linguistically will be judged negatively against this. The speech of a socially subordinate group will be interpreted as linguistically inadequate against that used by socially dominant groups. It has been found that women use more hedges and qualifiers than men. Feminine speech has been viewed as more tentative and has been deemed powerless speech. This is based on the view that masculine speech is the standard.

== Generic male symbols ==
On the Internet, many avatars are gender-neutral (such as an image of a smiley face). However, when an avatar is human and discernibly gendered, it usually appears to be a man.

Depictions of skeletons typically have male anatomy rather than female, even when the character of the skeleton is meant to be female.

Restroom symbols show the male as the default person, while the female is identified by a skirt.

Lions are often portrayed in fiction as patriarchal and thought of as "King of the Jungle," despite being led by females.

== Health ==
=== Oral hygiene ===
Toothpaste was designed for the pH of men's saliva based on studies in the 1950s. Men's saliva is more basic than women's saliva. As a result, women's teeth may suffer more acidic damage despite practicing proper oral health.

=== Birth control ===
Some scholars, such as Nancy Tuana analyzed birth control to be another site of androcentrism in health. While birth control options for men have been studied, these trials lost traction due to lack of funding and interest. A major concern for the male birth control side effects was loss of libido. Yet in regards to female birth control options, as feminist scholars express, loss of sex drive in addition to a multitude of other side effects did not halt research or raise concerns for women's health. The basis of gender-centric ideologies as discussed by feminist health advocate Tuana, demonstrate how socially constructed characteristics infiltrate biological understandings. For instance male sexuality is seen as active, while female sexuality is seen as passive, which contributed to such tolerance from the health community for the vast array of symptoms women experience regarding birth control. Participants of the women's health movement noted, "such side effects were seen as unacceptable for men but tolerable for women, perhaps because those associated with mood-lower sex drive, depression, or fatigue-were seen as compatible with female gender roles." Feminist discourse around the topic from Tuana's analysis, challenge terminology that presents women's sexuality as secondary and passive and men's sexuality as active and a priority.

=== Reproductive organs ===
Feminist scholars further analyzed androcentric frameworks for biological terminology when researching how scientists conceptualize understandings of the egg and the sperm. In 1991, Emily Martin published an article regarding how gender roles shape scientific accounts of reproduction. Her work examined textbooks at premedical and medical universities and found the egg tended to be seen as passive, and sperm was noted as active and energetic. The egg as she described, was presented as a mere vessel, while the sperm were described as a force of life in the medical texts. The sperm's journey in such texts, she found to be discussed as "an incredible feat," that was carried out "against all odds." Scholars such as Martin that analyzed medical texts, concluded that scientific research and health knowledge reflects cultural projections and gendered biases down to the cellular level.

Feminist scholars have also found that the clitoris and external aspects of female genitalia was repeatedly excluded from illustrations of female anatomy in 20th century and early-mid-century medical texts. Second and third wave feminists interpreted these exclusions as a lack of regard for female pleasure in health, as this became a major site of epistemological advocacy within initial liberatory movements.

== Impacts ==
Men are more severely impacted by androcentric thinking. However, the ideology has substantial effects on the way of thinking of everyone within it. In a 2022 study, in which 3,815 people were shown a selection of 256 images containing illusory faces (objects, in which humans see faces), 90% of the objects were on average by the participants identified as male.

== See also ==
- Honorary male
- Male as norm
- Male supremacy
- Manosphere
- Patriarchy
- Phallocentrism
- Trophy wife

== Literature ==
- Keller, Evelyn (1985). Reflections on gender and science. New Haven: Yale University Press. ISBN 9780300032918.
- Ginzberg, Ruth (1989), "Uncovering gynocentric science", in Tuana, Nancy, ed. (1989). Feminism and science. Bloomington: Indiana University Press. pp. 69–84. ISBN 9780253205254.
- Harding, Sandra; Hintikka, Merrill B., eds. (1983). Discovering reality: feminist perspectives on epistemology, metaphysics, methodology, and philosophy of science. Dordrecht, Holland Boston Hingham, Massachusetts: Kluwer Boston. ISBN 9789027714961.
- Harding, Sandra (1986). The science question in feminism. Ithaca London: Cornell University Press. ISBN 9780335153596.
- Harding, Sandra (1991). Whose science? Whose knowledge?: thinking from women's lives. Ithaca, New York: Cornell University Press. ISBN 9780801497469.
