= Buyout (disambiguation) =

A buyout is an investment transaction.

Buyout may also refer to:

== Drama ==
- Buyout (Breaking Bad), episode of US TV series

== Finance ==
- Employee buyout
- Leveraged buyout
- Management buyout
- Pension buyout

== Sports ==
- Buyout clause
