= Solvency II =

Directive in European Union law

Solvency II Directive 2009 (2009/138/EC) is a Directive in European Union law that codifies and harmonises the EU insurance regulation. Primarily this concerns the amount of capital that EU insurance companies must hold to reduce the risk of insolvency.

Following an EU Parliament vote on the Omnibus II Directive on 11 March 2014, Solvency II came into effect on 1 January 2016. This date had been previously pushed back many times. The framework was substantially revised by Directive (EU) 2025/2, adopted in November 2024, which introduced new capital calibrations, proportionality arrangements for smaller insurers, and mandatory integration of climate and sustainability risks. Member states must transpose the revised directive by 30 January 2027.

== Aims ==
EU insurance legislation aims to unify a single EU insurance market and enhance consumer protection. The third-generation Insurance Directives established an "EU passport" (single licence) for insurers to operate in all member states if they fulfilled EU conditions. Many member states concluded the EU minima were not enough, and took up their own reforms, which still led to differing regulations, hampering the goal of a single market.

== Political implications of Solvency II ==
A number of the large Life Insurers in the UK are unhappy with the way the legislation has been developed. In particular, concerns have been publicly expressed over a number of years by the CEO of Prudential, the UK's largest Life Insurance company.

Doubts about the basis of the Solvency II legislation, in particular the enforcement of a market-consistent valuation approach have also been expressed by American subsidiaries of UK parents - the impact of the 'equivalency' requirements are not well understood and there is some concern that the legislation could lead to overseas subsidiaries becoming uncompetitive with local peers, resulting in the need to sell them off, potentially resulting in a 'Fortress Europe'.

Following Brexit, the United Kingdom implemented its own framework, known as Solvency UK, which took full effect at 31 December 2024. The Prudential Regulation Authority relaxed the Matching Adjustment rules to allow insurers to hold more illiquid long-term assets such as infrastructure debt, and proposed the Matching Adjustment Accelerator in April 2025. The divergence between Solvency UK and the revised EU directive has prompted debate among EU-based insurers about competitive disparities in capital deployment.

== Background ==
Since Directive 73/239/EEC was introduced in 1973, more elaborate risk management systems developed. Solvency II reflects new risk management practices to define required capital and manage risk. While the "Solvency I" Directive was aimed at revising and updating the current EU Solvency regime, Solvency II has a much wider scope. A solvency capital requirement may have the following purposes:

- To reduce the risk that an insurer would be unable to meet claims;
- To reduce the losses suffered by policyholders in the event that a firm is unable to meet all claims fully;
- To provide early warning to supervisors so that they can intervene promptly if capital falls below the required level; and
- To promote confidence in the financial stability of the insurance sector

Often called "Basel for insurers," Solvency II is somewhat similar to the banking regulations of Basel II. For example, the proposed Solvency II framework has three main areas (pillars):

- Pillar 1 consists of the quantitative requirements (for example, the amount of capital an insurer should hold).
- Pillar 2 sets out requirements for the governance and risk management of insurers, as well as for the effective supervision of insurers.
- Pillar 3 focuses on disclosure and transparency requirements.

== Contents ==
Title I General rules on the taking-up and pursuit of direct insurance and reinsurance activities

== Pillar 1 ==
The pillar 1 framework set out qualitative and quantitative requirements for calculation of technical provisions and Solvency Capital Requirement (SCR) using either a standard formula given by the regulators or an internal model developed by the (re)insurance company.

Technical provisions are divided on claim provisions, pertaining to earned business and premium provisions, pertaining to unearned business. Premium provisions are not equal to unearned premium reserve.

The value of technical provision should be equal to the sum of best estimate of the liabilities and risk margin. The best estimate corresponds to the probability-weighted average of future cash-flows, taking into account the time value of money. Usage of central actuarial estimate is required and no margin for prudence is allowed. Only cash-flows that are within contract boundaries are taken into consideration. Solvency II specifies exact rules for determination of these contract boundaries.

Technical provisions represent the current amount the (re)insurance company would have to pay for an immediate transfer of its obligations to a third party.

The SCR is the capital required to ensure that the (re)insurance company will be able to meet its obligations over the next 12 months with a probability of at least 99.5%. In addition to the SCR capital a Minimum capital requirement (MCR) must be calculated which represents the threshold below which the national supervisor (regulator) would intervene. The MCR is intended to correspond to an 85% probability of adequacy over a one-year period and is bounded between 25% and 45% of the SCR.

For supervisory purposes, the SCR and MCR can be regarded as "soft" and "hard" floors respectively. That is, a regulatory ladder of intervention applies once the capital holding of the (re)insurance undertaking falls below the SCR, with the intervention becoming progressively more intense as the capital holding approaches the MCR. The Solvency II Directive provides regional supervisors with a number of discretions to address breaches of the MCR, including the withdrawal of authorization from selling new business and the winding up of the company.

== 2025 revision and 2026 implementation ==
Directive (EU) 2025/2, formally adopted by the European Parliament and Council in November 2024, is the first comprehensive revision of the Solvency II framework since its entry into force in 2016. The revised directive amends the original 2009 text across several material dimensions and must be transposed by all EU member states by 30 January 2027, with the amended delegated regulations entering application from January 2027.

The principal calibration changes affecting European insurers include tougher spread-risk stress tests, new extrapolation formulas for long-term liabilities affecting life and annuity writers, a revised risk margin methodology designed to reduce procyclicality, and enhanced treatment of long-term equity investments and participations. The revision also mandates integration of sustainability and climate risks into the standard formula for the first time, reflecting recommendations from the EIOPA opinion on supervisory convergence for climate-related risks published in 2023.

A significant proportionality innovation in the 2025 revision is the introduction of "small and non-complex enterprises" (SNCE) status, available to insurance undertakings below EUR 100 million in gross premium volume with limited cross-border activity. SNCE-status insurers benefit from reduced reporting obligations, including elimination of the regular supervisory report and simplified quarterly reporting templates. Academic analysis of the proportionality principle in Solvency II has noted the tension between maintaining meaningful supervisory standards and reducing the compliance burden on smaller mutuals and cooperatives across Europe.

=== Climate stress testing ===
National supervisory authorities have developed mandatory climate stress testing methodologies in advance of the 2025 revision's formal transposition. The Autorité de contrôle prudentiel et de résolution (ACPR), France's prudential supervisor, published the results of its second climate stress test in May 2024, projecting that the aggregate SCR coverage ratio for French insurers could decline from approximately 230 percent in 2022 to around 170 percent by 2027 under an adverse scenario, a deterioration of 48 percentage points in the stress year relative to baseline, with aggregate own funds decreasing by 28 percent. These projections do not imply that French insurers face near-term solvency risk, as the aggregate solvency ratio stood at 241 percent at end-June 2025, but they indicate that smaller insurers with solvency ratios near the regulatory floor face heightened risk under the revised climate calibrations.

EIOPA coordinates climate stress testing across the European Economic Area through its Union-wide stress test programme. The 2023 EIOPA stress test incorporated a "sudden repricing" scenario in which a disorderly climate transition produces simultaneous shocks to interest rates, credit spreads, and equity values. The results identified concentrations of climate-sensitive assets in life insurance portfolios across several member states, and informed the calibration choices subsequently embedded in Directive (EU) 2025/2.

== Criticisms ==
Think-tanks such as the World Pensions & Investments Forum have argued that European legislators pushed dogmatically and naïvely for the adoption of the Basel II and Solvency II recommendations. In essence, they forced private banks, central banks, insurance companies and their regulators to rely more on assessments of credit risk by private rating agencies. Thus, part of the public regulatory authority was abdicated in favor of private rating agencies. The calibration of the standard formula for assessing equity risk has been strongly criticized by the German economist Stefan Mittnik for the fact that the procedure used for determining correlations between different asset classes gives rise to spurious (i.e., unreliable) correlations or spurious relationships.

The demanding nature of Solvency II legislation compared to current regulations has attracted criticism. According to RIMES, complying with the new legislation will impose a complex and significant burden on many European financial organizations, with 75% of firms in 2011 reporting that they were not in a position to comply with Pillar III reporting requirements.

The Matching adjustment mechanism of Solvency II has also been criticised as a form of creative accounting that hides the real value of liabilities.

Academic research has raised concerns about the procyclical effects of Solvency II's market-consistent valuation approach. Jørgensen, Davidoff, and Perotti (2017) demonstrated that mark-to-market capital requirements can amplify asset price volatility by forcing insurers into simultaneous asset sales during downturns, a dynamic not present under the prior Solvency I regime based on book-value accounting. The European Systemic Risk Board has similarly warned that Solvency II's reliance on risk-free interest rate curves makes insurance capital requirements highly sensitive to the low-for-long interest rate environment, creating incentives to reach for yield in illiquid asset classes that may not be fully reflected in the standard formula.

The compliance cost burden has been identified as a structural disadvantage for small and medium-sized mutuals. A study by McKinsey and Company estimated that full Solvency II compliance requires annual expenditure equivalent to 3 to 5 percent of premiums for smaller insurers, compared with under 1 percent for large groups that can amortize systems and governance costs over a larger premium base. The introduction of SNCE proportionality status in Directive (EU) 2025/2 is intended to partially address this concern, though critics note that the EUR 100 million threshold excludes the majority of mid-sized European mutuals that face the highest relative compliance burden.

== See also ==
- EU law
- European company law
- Financial risk management § Insurance
- Own risk and solvency assessment
