= Matching adjustment =

The Matching adjustment is a measure in the Solvency II regulatory regime for insurers that allows an insurance or reinsurance undertaking to adjust the relevant risk-free interest rate term structure used to calculate the best estimate of certain long term insurance obligations, when those obligations are backed by a closely matched portfolio of assets, subject to prior approval from the supervisory authority.

It is one of the long term guarantees measures that seek to recognise the effect of asset illiquidity and to reduce short term volatility in regulatory balance sheets for eligible life insurance business. Under Solvency II the matching adjustment has been applied by life insurers across the European Economic Area, and following the withdrawal of the United Kingdom from the European Union it has been retained and adapted in UK law as part of the Solvency UK reforms, including changes to the rules and supervisory expectations introduced by the Prudential Regulation Authority in 2024.

== Background ==
Solvency II was designed as a risk based and mostly market consistent regime, under which the value of technical provisions responds to changes in market prices and interest rates. During the design of the framework, policymakers and industry groups raised concerns that short term movements in credit spreads could cause large swings in reported solvency positions for insurers that write long term life insurance business with guarantees, even if the underlying cashflows of their assets and liabilities were expected to be held to maturity. In response, the Omnibus II Directive introduced a long term guarantees package that added several permanent measures to the Solvency II framework for long dated insurance obligations.

The long term guarantees package includes the matching adjustment, the volatility adjustment and transitional measures on technical provisions and interest rates. The European Insurance and Occupational Pensions Authority (EIOPA) describes the matching adjustment as the measure that applies to portfolios of eligible long term life insurance liabilities that are backed by fixed income assets with closely aligned cash flows, and it works by allowing part of the spread on those assets to be recognised in the discount rate used to value the liabilities under specified conditions.

The matching adjustment builds on the idea that when an insurer holds a portfolio of fixed income assets to meet predictable long term obligations, part of the spread of those assets over basic risk free interest rates compensates for illiquidity rather than expected defaults and downgrades. Earlier in the development of Solvency II an explicit illiquidity premium was tested in quantitative impact studies for long term guarantees, but this concept was replaced by the matching adjustment. In the final framework, the matching adjustment allows a portion of this illiquidity related spread to be reflected in the discount rate used to value certain long term life insurance obligations, subject to strict eligibility conditions and a deduction for a fundamental spread that represents retained credit risk.

== Mechanics and calculation ==
Under Solvency II the matching adjustment modifies the basic relevant risk free interest rate term structure that is published by EIOPA or national authorities and used to discount insurance liabilities. For an approved matching adjustment portfolio, the insurer calculates a matching adjustment term structure that is added to the basic risk free curve, so that the discount rate for cash flows at time $t$ becomes $r_t + \text{MA}_t$, where $r_t$ is the basic risk free rate and $\text{MA}_t$ is the matching adjustment at that maturity. The higher discount rate reduces the present value of the cash flows in the portfolio and therefore reduces the best estimate component of technical provisions.

For a portfolio of fixed income assets backing eligible insurance obligations, the starting point for the matching adjustment is the asset credit spread. The annualised yield, $y_t$ on the assets at maturity $t$ can be written as the sum of the basic risk free rate, $r_t$ and a credit spread, $s_t$, such that $s_t = y_t - r_t$.

The fundamental spread, $\text{FS}_t$, represents the part of the spread that compensates for expected defaults and credit downgrades and other retained risks, and a residual part that can be recognised in the matching adjustment. The matching adjustment at maturity $t$ is calculated as $\text{MA}_t = \max \left( 0, s_t - \text{FS}_t \right)$, so that the adjustment cannot be negative and is limited by the size of the excess of the portfolio spread over the fundamental spread.

In practice the matching adjustment is calculated at the level of the whole portfolio rather than for individual assets. The spread and fundamental spread inputs are derived for each combination of duration, credit quality and asset class using technical information on fundamental spreads that is published regularly by EIOPA or, in the United Kingdom, by the Prudential Regulation Authority.

Insurers then determine a matching adjustment term structure by aggregating asset level spreads and fundamental spreads with weights based on the timing and size of asset cash flows and by reflecting the pattern of liability cash flows in the approved portfolio. The calculation must be consistent with the assumption that assets are held to maturity, any rebalancing of the portfolio is tightly constrained, and that firms maintain governance, stress testing and documentation to show that the matching adjustment remains appropriate over time.

== Reforms and debate ==
Within the European Union, the matching adjustment has formed part of the wider review of Solvency II. In its opinion on the 2020 review of Solvency II, the EIOPA concluded that the matching adjustment framework was broadly functioning as intended, and proposed targeted changes rather than a full redesign. These included allowing fuller recognition of diversification between matching adjustment portfolios and other business in the standard formula solvency capital requirement and updating implementing technical standards on approval processes.

Insurance Europe supported more extensive recognition of long-term investments and called for further adjustments to the long term guarantees package, while expressing concerns that some of EIOPA's suggestions could tighten elements of the framework or increase capital requirements. As part of the post review implementation, EIOPA has consulted on revised implementing technical standards for matching adjustment approval procedures, including changes to reflect full diversification with non ring fenced portfolios and closer links between liquidity planning and matching adjustment risk management.

=== In the United Kingdom ===
In the United Kingdom, the matching adjustment has been central to the domestic review of Solvency II and the development of the Solvency UK regime. HM Treasury’s 2022 consultation on the Solvency II review and its November 2022 consultation response set objectives of maintaining policyholder protection and financial stability, supporting the competitiveness of the UK insurance sector and enabling greater investment in productive assets. The government stated that steps on the fundamental spread, in combination with other changes to the matching adjustment, were intended to allow insurers to increase their investment in productive assets.

The Prudential Regulation Authority (PRA) issued a discussion paper and technical annex setting out its view that reform of the fundamental spread was needed to reflect uncertainty around future credit losses and the widening range of assets held in matching adjustment portfolios. The PRA's analysis suggested that a credit risk premium equal to at least a fixed proportion of observed spreads was required to ensure that the level of matching adjustment benefit remained consistent with a prudent transfer value for liabilities.

The PRA's subsequent consultation CP19/23 and its 2024 policy statement PS10/24 implemented the first substantive round of Solvency UK reforms to the matching adjustment. The reforms broaden investment flexibility by allowing certain assets with highly predictable rather than strictly fixed cash flows into matching adjustment portfolios, subject to conditions and quantitative limits. The reforms introduce a more granular, notched approach to the fundamental spread and permit firms to apply voluntary additions where they judge the standard fundamental spread to be insufficient for particular assets. Governance expectations are strengthened, including an annual senior manager attestation that the matching adjustment benefit remains appropriate for each portfolio and the introduction of additional reporting such as the Matching Adjustment Liability Information Return.

== See also ==
- Solvency II
- Life insurance
- European Insurance and Occupational Pensions Authority
- Prudential Regulation Authority
- Own risk and solvency assessment
