= Sam Woods (civil servant) =

New Zealand-born British civil servant

Sam Woods (born 7 May 1973) is a New Zealand-born British civil servant. In July 2016, he became the deputy governor of the Bank of England, and head of the Prudential Regulation Authority (PRA), which oversees the UK banking and insurance sectors. As head of the PRA, he succeeded Andrew Bailey, who became the head of the Financial Conduct Authority (FCA). Prior to his role at the Bank, Woods held positions at HM Treasury, UK Financial Investments, the Independent Commission on Banking, and earlier at Diageo and McKinsey.

Woods was educated at Winchester College, graduated in history and English from the University of Oxford in 1995 and has an MBA from INSEAD. He is married to Mary Starks, an executive at OVO energy. They reside in Stockwell, London, and have three children.
