= Andrew Bailey (banker) =

English banker (born 1959)

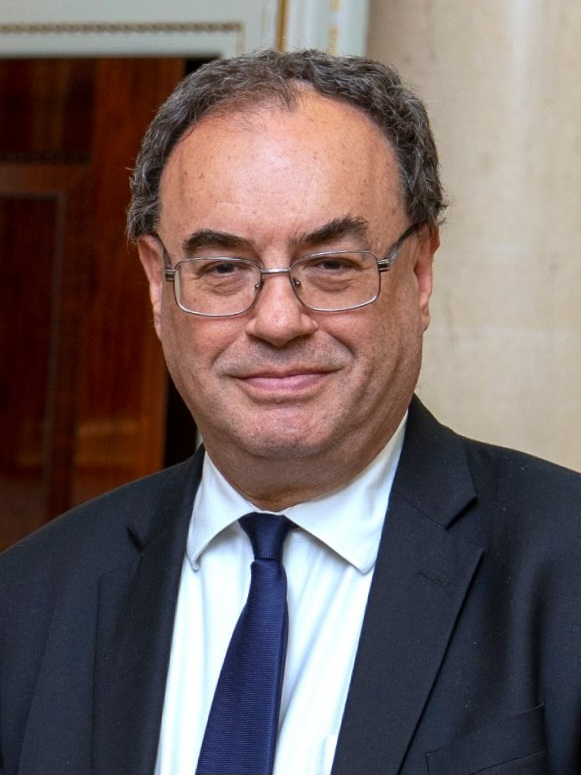
- Bailey in 2022.

Chair of the Financial Stability Board
- Incumbent
- Assumed office 1 July 2025
- Preceded by: Klaas Knot

Governor of the Bank of England
- Incumbent
- Assumed office 16 March 2020
- Appointed by: Sajid Javid
- Preceded by: Mark Carney

Chief Executive Officer of the Financial Conduct Authority
- In office 1 July 2016 – 15 March 2020
- Preceded by: Tracey McDermott
- Succeeded by: Nikhil Rathi

Deputy Governor of the Bank of England for Prudential Regulation
- In office 1 April 2013 – 1 July 2016
- Governor: Mark Carney
- Preceded by: Position established
- Succeeded by: Sam Woods

Chief Cashier of the Bank of England
- In office 1 January 2004 – 1 April 2011
- Governor: Mervyn King
- Preceded by: Merlyn Lowther
- Succeeded by: Chris Salmon

Personal details
- Born: Andrew John Bailey; 30 March 1959 (age 67) Leicester, England, UK
- Spouse: Cheryl Schonhardt
- Children: 2
- Education: Queens' College, Cambridge (BA, PhD)

Andrew John Bailey (born 30 March 1959) is an English banker who has been Governor of the Bank of England since 16 March 2020. He has also been chair of the Financial Stability Board since 1 July 2025.

Previously he served as the Chief Cashier of the Bank of England under Mervyn King from January 2004 until April 2011, Deputy Governor of the Bank of England for Prudential Regulation under Mark Carney from April 2013 to July 2016 and Chief Executive of the Financial Conduct Authority from 2016 to 2020.

== Education ==
Bailey attended Wyggeston Boys' Grammar School, Leicester, from where he went to Queens' College, Cambridge. He gained a B.A. in history (promoted to M.A. (Cantab.) in 1985) and a Ph.D. from the Faculty of History, University of Cambridge in 1984 with a thesis on the impact of the Napoleonic Wars on the development of the cotton industry in Lancashire. At Cambridge he chaired the university's branch of the Fabian Society.

== Career ==
After university, Bailey became a research officer at the London School of Economics, then joined the Bank of England in 1985. He held various roles, including as executive director for banking services, Chief Cashier, and head of the bank's Special Resolution Unit (SRU). Earlier roles included Governor's private secretary, and head of the International Economic Analysis Division in Monetary Analysis.

From August 2007 until April 2011, Bailey led the bank's special operations addressing banking sector issues, including during the 2008 financial crisis. In 2009, he served as chairman and chief executive of Dunfermline Building Society Bridge Bank Ltd.

On 1 April 2013, Bailey became chief executive of the new Prudential Regulation Authority and the first deputy governor of the Bank of England for Prudential Regulation.

=== Financial Conduct Authority ===
On 26 January 2016, it was announced Bailey become CEO of the UK Financial Conduct Authority replacing acting CEO Tracey McDermott, who had taken over following Martin Wheatley's resignation after a vote of no confidence by George Osborne in July 2015.

In September 2019, Bailey faced allegations of falling asleep during a meeting with campaigners for the British Steel Pension Scheme (BSPS) and failing to act quickly on a major pension mis-selling scandal. A subsequent National Audit Office probe into the case concluded that members of the BSPS suffered significant financial losses because the FCA failed to take action on numerous reports of some FCA-authorised firms giving unsuitable transfer advice. This led to parliamentarians commenting that the FCA was asleep at the wheel.

In March 2020, the Treasury Select Committee criticised the performance of the Financial Conduct Authority. The committee said it would monitor closely the culture, operations and transparency of the FCA. This followed damning criticisms of the watchdog by consumer and industry groups during Bailey's tenure as its chief executive.

In December 2020, The Gloster Report, was released: written by Dame Elizabeth Gloster it provided a damning review of the Financial Conduct Authority's supervision of London Capital & Finance (LCF). The review found significant flaws in the regulator's practices while it was under the leadership of Andrew Bailey (from 2016 to 2020), which allowed the firm to market high-risk products to investors, leading to £237 million in losses.

A significant dispute arose when it was revealed that Andrew Bailey had asked investigators to remove references to his personal responsibility from the report. In a letter to Parliament, following his appearance, Dame Elizabeth said: "To the extent that Mr Bailey's evidence was that his representations to me were limited to requesting a distinction between personal culpability and responsibility... I must disagree. I also reject his suggestion that there has been a 'fundamental misunderstanding' on this issue."

=== Governor of the Bank of England ===
On 3 June 2019, it was reported in The Times that Bailey was the favourite to replace Mark Carney as the new governor of the Bank of England. According to The Economist: "He is widely seen within the bank as a safe pair of hands, an experienced technocrat who knows how to manage an organisation." On 20 December 2019, it was officially announced by the Chancellor Sajid Javid that Bailey would take over as governor on 16 March 2020.

In 2021, Bailey objected to the title of a report by the House of Lords' Economic Affairs Committee, "Quantitative easing: a dangerous addiction?", saying "[Addiction] is a word that has a very damaging and particular meaning to many people who are suffering. I think it is wrong to use that word loosely, and frankly I think it was a very poor choice of language".

In February 2022, Bailey faced criticism from union leaders over his comments asking workers not to demand a pay rise, in the context of the cost-of-living crisis. When pressed by parliamentarians as to Bailey's salary, he replied with an approximate figure of £500,000, stating "I can't tell you exactly what it is, I don't carry that around in my head".

In May 2022, Bailey stated that the possibility of more rises in food prices was a "major worry" for the UK and other countries. He said the Russian invasion of Ukraine was affecting food supplies.

Following the "mini-budget", Bailey said that the BoE "will not hesitate" to raise interest rates if needed to meet its 2% inflation target, and that it was watching financial markets "very closely" following sharp moves in asset prices.

In 2025, responding to Rachel Reeves's proposal to ease regulation to spur UK growth, Bailey warned against weakening regulations, insisting there is "no trade-off" between growth and financial stability, warning not to forget about the pain of the 2008 financial crisis.

In 2025, following the introduction of an internship program at the Bank of England which explicitly excluded the white majority; the member of Parliament Rupert Lowe recommended the bank not exclude white applicants from the internship. This has led to suggestions that Bailey is politicising the bank and behaving in a biased manner.

In April 2025, Bailey was appointed the next chair of the Financial Stability Board.

In August 2026, Bailey sent a two-page letter to G20 finance ministers and central bank governors, warning that "frontier AI models" pose an immediate threat to the global financial system.

Bailey's term as governor is due to end on 15 March 2028.

== Personal life ==
He is married to Cheryl Schonhardt-Bailey, professor of political science and former head of the Department of Government at the London School of Economics and Political Science (2019–22).

Government offices
Preceded by Mark Carney	Governor of the Bank of England; 2020–present	Incumbent
Diplomatic posts
Preceded by Klaas Knot	Chair of the Financial Stability Board; 2025–present	Incumbent
