= F&G =

American insurance company

F&G Annuities & Life, Inc.
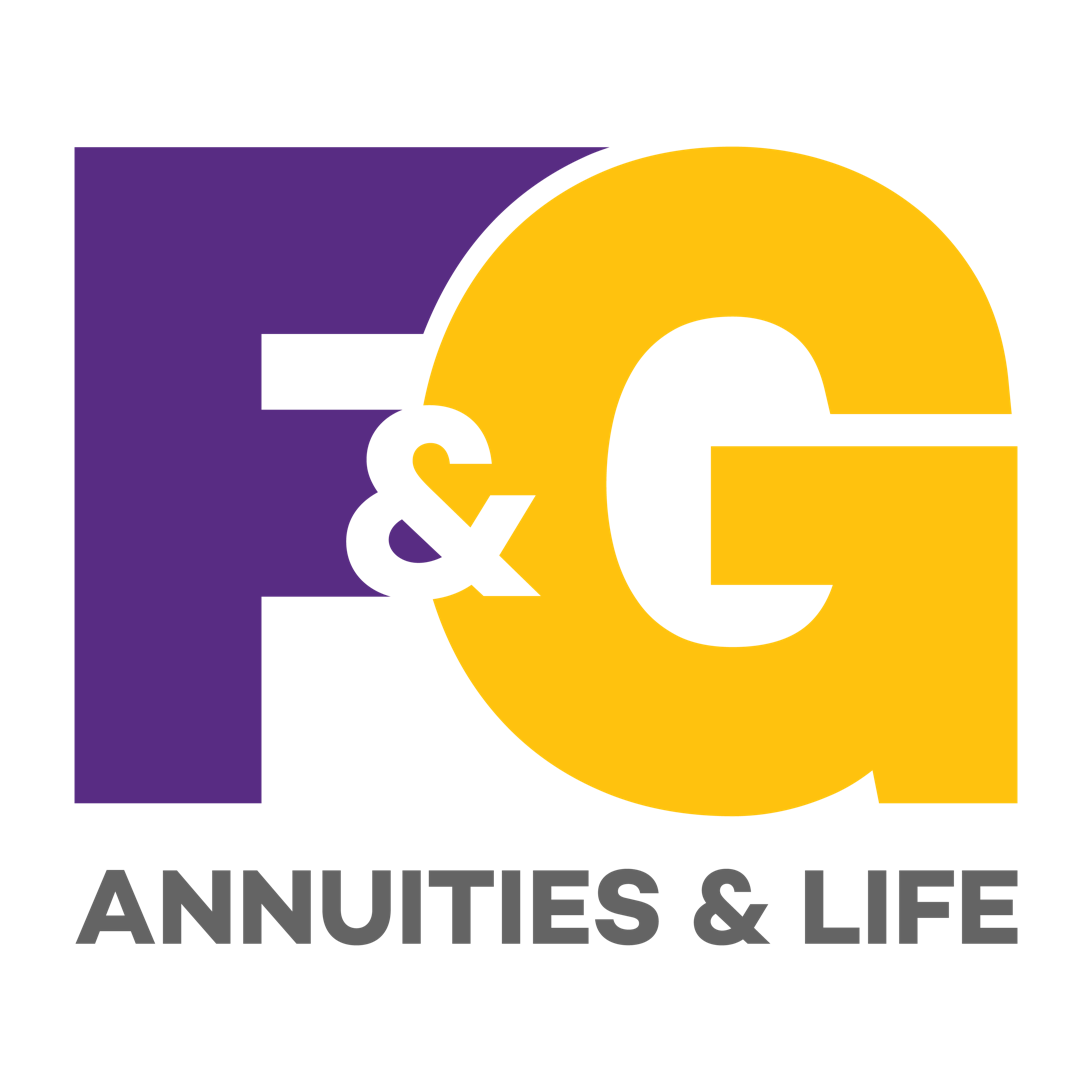
- Type: Subsidiary
- Traded as: NYSE: FG; Russell 2000 component; S&P 600 component
- Industry: Financial services
- Founded: 1959; 67 years ago
- Headquarters: Des Moines, Iowa
- Area served: United States
- Key people: William P. Foley, II (Chairman); Christopher Blunt (President & CEO)
- Products: Annuities; Life Insurance
- Revenue: ▼US$2.340 Billion (Fiscal Year Ended December 31, 2022)
- Operating income: ▼US$0.598 Billion (Fiscal Year Ended December 31, 2022)
- Net income: ▼US$0.481 Billion (Fiscal Year Ended December 31, 2022)
- Total assets: ▲US$55.075 Billion (Fiscal Year Ended December 31, 2022)
- Total equity: ▼US$1.816 Billion (Fiscal Year Ended December 31, 2022)
- Number of employees: 872 (Fiscal Year Ended December 31, 2022)
- Parent: Fidelity National Financial
- Website: fglife.com

F&G Annuities & Life, Inc. is a public company founded in 1959 and headquartered in Des Moines, Iowa. It primarily provides annuities, life insurance, and pension buyout services.

Known as Fidelity & Guaranty Life until a 2019 rebrand, the company has been a subsidiary of Fidelity National Financial, a previously unrelated company, since 2020.

== History ==
The company was incorporated in 1959 under the laws of Maryland and commenced business in 1960. The company was primarily formed to write individual life insurance and annuity products. Until June 1, 1995, the company was a wholly owned subsidiary of United States Fidelity and Guaranty Company ("USF&G Company"), a Maryland-domiciled property and casualty insurer. USF&G Corporation, a Maryland-domiciled insurance holding company, was the company's ultimate controlling entity.

On January 20, 1998, St. Paul announced that it would acquire USF&G for $2.8 billion and merge both entities into a single organization. On April 24, 1998, as a result of the merger of its parent, USF&G Corporation, with The St. Paul Companies, Inc. (St. Paul Travelers), an insurance holding company incorporated in the state of Minnesota, the company became an indirect subsidiary of St. Paul Companies, Inc. Effective January 1, 1999, under a plan of merger, with the approval of the Maryland Insurance Administration, the company's ultimate parent, USF&G Corporation, merged with St. Paul Fire and Marine Insurance Company (Fire & Marine), a Minnesota corporation. As a result of this merger, the company became a direct wholly owned subsidiary of Fire & Marine, with St. Paul as its ultimate controlling entity.

On September 18, 2001, the company was acquired by Old Mutual plc ("Old Mutual"), a London-based financial services company, which the Maryland Insurance Administration approved on September 21, 2001. As a result of the acquisition, the Company became a direct, wholly owned subsidiary of Old Mutual U.S. Life Holdings, Inc. ("OMUSLH"), a Delaware holding company that is ultimately owned by Old Mutual. The listed purchase price was US$635 million.

On December 31, 2002, the Maryland Insurance Administration approved a reorganization plan within the Old Mutual plc holding company system. Old Mutual plc created a new Texas-domiciled life insurance company, Omnia Life Insurance Company, Inc. ("Omnia"), and all of the outstanding common stock of the company was contributed to Omnia by the company's parent, OMULSH. As a result of the reorganization, the Company became a direct, wholly owned subsidiary of Omnia.

Effective January 1, 2007, the company's board of directors approved a resolution to amend its charter to change its name to OM Financial Life Insurance Company. This name change was submitted and approved by the State of Maryland Department of Assessments and Taxation and the Administration, effective January 1, 2007.

On January 16, 2009, the Securities and Exchange Commission("SEC") issued Rule 151A, claiming indexed annuities should be regulated as securities and should only be sold by registered representatives. A lawsuit was filed on the same day challenging the SEC's ability to regulate fixed indexed annuities. Legislation was also introduced in Congress to exempt these annuities from securities regulation. Management of OM Financial Life Insurance actively participated in industry opposition to the proposal.

On April 6, 2011, Old Mutual announced the completion of the sale of its life and annuity business to the Harbinger Group. Harbinger expressed its intention to use cash flow from the company to fund future acquisitions for the conglomerate. Harbinger appointed Lee Launer, a former senior executive of MetLife to run the company as CEO. At that time, "OM Financial Life Insurance Company" changed its name back to "Fidelity & Guaranty Life Insurance Company".

In 2013, the company announced a move of its headquarters to Des Moines, Iowa, citing a lower cost of business and a desire to operate under a similar regulator as rival companies. The company launched an initial public offering in late 2013. In October 2014, the company hired Chris Littlefield, former CEO of Aviva USA, as President of the company. The company subsequently appointed him CEO in April 2014. In August 2013, Fidelity & Guaranty Life filed Form S-1 with the U.S. Securities and Exchange Commission expressing its intention to complete an initial public equity offering.

In November 2015, Fidelity announced an agreement to sell the company to the Chinese insurance firm Anbang Insurance for a fee of around $1.57 billion. The deal was terminated, and the company was sold to CF Corp in 2017. CF Corp rebranded as FGL Holdings.

In December 2018, FGL Holdings appointed Christopher Blunt as the President & CEO of the company, replacing Christopher Littlefield. In 2019, FGL Holdings rebranded Fidelity & Guaranty Life as F&G, seeking to distinguish the company from other companies with Fidelity in their names. Later in 2019, FGL Holdings agreed to be acquired by the previously unrelated Fidelity National Financial, a deal that closed in 2020. In December 2019, the company announced that it will move its headquarters from Two Ruan building at 601 Locust St. to leased space in 801 Grand which is the tallest building in downtown Des Moines.

In December 2022, the company returned to public trading following a 15% stock issuance.

In 2026, Christopher Blunt retired and Conor Murphy took over as CEO and President.

== Business ==
Policies are offered in every state and the District of Columbia; in New York, products are offered through a wholly owned subsidiary, Fidelity & Guaranty Life Insurance Company of New York. The company focuses on the sale of individual life insurance products and annuities, which include deferred annuities (fixed indexed and fixed rate annuities) and immediate annuities.
