= Pension buyout =

A pension buyout is the transfer of some or all pension scheme liabilities to an insurance company, usually by paying a premium so that the insurer becomes responsible for the covered benefits. It is used mainly for defined benefit pension schemes as a form of pension risk transfer. A buyout may cover all members of a scheme, after which the scheme is expected to wind up, or it may follow earlier insurance transactions that cover only part of the liabilities.

A buyout differs from a pension buy-in because, in a buy-in, the pension scheme holds the insurance policy as a scheme asset while the scheme remains responsible to members. In the United Kingdom, the term can also refer to an individual buyout policy, including a Section 32 policy, under which a person's pension rights are transferred from an occupational pension scheme to a policy with an insurer.

== History ==
Before the mid-2000s, UK bulk buyouts were a relatively small part of the defined benefit pensions market and were often associated with scheme wind-up or employer insolvency. The UK market had annual transaction volumes of about £1 billion to £2 billion from the mid-1980s to 2004, before rising to about £8 billion in 2008. The market evolved from transactions for insolvent sponsors to transactions for solvent sponsors that wanted to discharge funded pension liabilities.

A major regulatory background change was the Pensions Act 2004, which created the Pension Protection Fund and reformed the UK framework for defined benefit schemes. The House of Commons Library says the fund was introduced in response to cases where pension schemes wound up with insufficient assets, began operating on 6 April 2005, and applies where an employer becomes insolvent and the scheme lacks enough assets to cover Pension Protection Fund compensation levels. The 2004 Act and new accounting rules contributed to greater interest among solvent employers in offloading defined benefit pension risks.

The global longevity de-risking market began in the United Kingdom in 2006, after a market that had previously been dominated by Prudential and Legal & General. Paternoster was the first specialist buyout company, followed by other new entrants including Pension Insurance Corporation, Synesis, Lucida, and Rothesay Life.

Early transactions in this modern market were small compared with later bulk annuity deals. Paternoster executed a buyout of the Cuthbert Heath Family Plan in November 2006, covering 33 members, and carried out a pensioner buy-in with Hunting PLC in January 2007. Buy-ins then became part of the route to full buyout, allowing a scheme to insure liabilities while keeping the insurance policy as a scheme asset before any later transfer of direct responsibility to the insurer.

In the United States, large pension risk transfer transactions drew greater attention in 2012. The General Motors and Prudential Financial transaction completed in November 2012 as a $25.1 billion pension risk transfer, the largest of its kind at the time by a wide margin in both the United States and globally. The Harvard Business School described the General Motors transaction as a partial pension buyout and also noted Verizon Communications' $7.5 billion bulk annuity transaction in the same year.

== Types ==
A full scheme buyout covers the liabilities of all members of a defined benefit pension scheme. In this form, the insurer receives a premium and becomes directly responsible for paying the covered pensions, while the trustees can wind up the scheme and remove the employer link after the transfer has been completed.

A buy-in is a related insurance transaction but is not itself a full buyout. In a buy-in, the scheme buys a bulk annuity policy from an insurer and holds it as a scheme asset. The policy may match some liabilities, such as pensions already in payment, or it may cover all liabilities as an intermediate step before a later full buyout.

The term can also describe an individual buyout policy in the United Kingdom. MoneyHelper describes this as a policy used when an employer's pension scheme is closing and an insurer is paid to run and pay the pension instead. Such policies may also be called Section 32 pension buyout policies or deferred annuity contracts.

== Endgame options and alternatives ==
For a defined benefit scheme, an insured buyout is one possible endgame rather than the only way to manage liabilities. The Pensions Regulator groups defined benefit endgame arrangements into governance, covenant, financial, and insurance options. Its insurance examples include longevity insurance, buy-in, and buy-out, while financial examples include capital-backed arrangements and superfunds.

Some schemes may continue to run rather than transfer immediately to an insurer. The Pensions Regulator describes run-on scenarios in which trustees and the employer retain the scheme, consider the level of risk being run, assess the likely scale and timing of any surplus, and set a review period for the strategy. Capital-backed arrangements are another alternative. They retain a link with the employer while third-party capital supports the scheme, sometimes with the objective of reaching a buyout funding level after an agreed period.

Superfunds are not insured buyouts. They are consolidation vehicles or similar arrangements in which a defined benefit scheme transfers to another vehicle and the employer covenant is typically replaced by a financial covenant or capital buffer. The Pensions Regulator's gateway principles say a transfer to a superfund should only be considered where the scheme cannot access buyout immediately, has no realistic prospect of buyout in the foreseeable future, and the transfer improves the likelihood that members will receive full benefits.

== Process ==
A buyout is usually considered as part of a defined benefit scheme's endgame planning. The preparation stage can include professional advice, assessment of the employer covenant, management of conflicts of interest, risk assessment, stress testing, and consideration of whether the arrangement could be unwound. The Pensions Regulator describes a buyout as a complete risk transfer, subject to residual risks, in which an insurer receives a premium and becomes directly responsible for paying members' pensions.

The premium reflects the insurer's charge for taking on almost all of the insured risk and its profit margin, so the cost may be higher than the amount needed for a scheme to run on without insurance. Preparation can affect insurer engagement and pricing. The Pensions Regulator identifies data cleansing, benefit specification, and investment alignment with insurance pricing as relevant parts of an efficient buyout process. PASA guidance on data readiness says insurers expect member data to be complete, accurate, up to date, and provided early in the de-risking process, and that poor-quality or incomplete data can increase transaction costs, delay transactions, and create uncertainty.

Residual risks may remain after the insurance transfer. The Pensions Regulator gives examples including data issues, incorrect benefits being insured, and beneficiaries being left out of the data. These risks may be addressed through an all-risks transfer where available, indemnities, insurance, data cleansing, or retention of risk by the scheme or employer.

When a full buyout is completed, the scheme normally moves towards winding up. In the United Kingdom, The Pensions Regulator lists key wind-up activities for defined benefit schemes, including securing pensioner benefits, obtaining insurer terms for deferred benefits, issuing details of insured benefits, completing a final actuarial valuation, and obtaining final audited accounts.

== Market ==
The pension buyout market is usually reported as part of the wider market for pension risk transfer, buy-ins, and bulk purchase annuities. This is because a full buyout may be preceded by one or more buy-ins, and because market reports often group insured risk-transfer transactions together.

=== United Kingdom ===
In the United Kingdom, improved funding among occupational defined benefit schemes has increased the number of schemes able to insure their liabilities. The Pensions Regulator reported that, at 31 March 2025, there were around 4,700 private-sector occupational defined benefit schemes with £1.1 trillion of assets and around nine million savers. On a buyout basis, the share of schemes in surplus rose from 2% at 31 March 2016 to 52% at 31 March 2025, while the aggregate surplus for those schemes rose from around £2 billion to £92 billion.

The Pensions Regulator projected that around 2,400 to 2,600 schemes, with £200 billion to £400 billion of assets, could participate in insurance transactions over the 10 years from 31 March 2025. In the previous year, it reported around 300 bulk purchase annuity transactions, transferring around £50 billion of assets from occupational defined benefit schemes to insurers.

Insurers are the principal counterparties in UK buy-in and buyout transactions. The Prudential Regulation Authority's 2025 life insurance stress test covered eleven of the largest UK life insurers active in the bulk purchase annuity market, which together accounted for more than 90% of UK annuity liabilities. In a November 2025 market overview, LCP listed Aviva, Blumont Annuity Company, Canada Life, Just, Legal & General, M&G, Pension Insurance Corporation, Rothesay, Royal London, Standard Life, and Utmost Life and Pensions as insurers covered by its UK buy-in and buyout market review.

=== United States ===
In the United States, market reporting commonly uses the term pension risk transfer and distinguishes single-premium buy-out and buy-in annuity transactions. LIMRA reported that new single-premium buy-out sales were $31.3 billion in 2025, while new buy-in premium was $17.5 billion. It also reported that single-premium buy-out assets reached $326 billion in 2025, and that combined single-premium pension risk transfer assets were $342.1 billion.

Aon reported that $48.7 billion of United States pension risk transfer premium was transacted across 697 deals in 2025, and that 22 insurers were actively bidding in the market heading into 2026. Its 2026 report said that 15 insurers sold more than $1 billion in pension risk transfer premium in 2025, with nine of those insurers surpassing $2 billion. It also said insurer participation may vary by transaction size, plan complexity, mortality profile, transaction type, and plan provisions.

The Pension Benefit Guaranty Corporation has analysed pension risk transfer activity among single-employer defined benefit plans through annuity purchases and lump-sum windows. Its 2024 analysis reported that the number of plans making annuity purchases increased from 91 in 2015 to 225 in 2022.

== Regulation and member protection ==
In the United Kingdom, trustees remain responsible for deciding whether an insured buyout is appropriate before the transfer is completed. The Pensions Regulator's guidance on defined benefit endgame options says trustees should take professional advice, assess the effect on the employer covenant, manage conflicts of interest, carry out risk assessment, stress test preferred options, and understand whether an arrangement could be unwound.

After a UK buyout, protection depends on the legal form of the insured benefits. The Financial Services Compensation Scheme says pensions provided by UK-regulated insurers can generally qualify as contracts of long-term insurance, while occupational pension schemes are not protected by the scheme if they fail and may instead be protected by the Pension Protection Fund.

In the United States, fiduciaries selecting an annuity provider for a defined benefit plan are subject to ERISA fiduciary standards. Federal guidance states that fiduciaries should take steps calculated to obtain the safest annuity available unless another choice would be in participants' interests, and should conduct an objective, thorough, and analytical search that evaluates claims-paying ability and creditworthiness. The Pension Benefit Guaranty Corporation has stated that participants who receive an annuity from a private insurer through risk transfer activity no longer have accrued benefits in the pension plan and are no longer covered by PBGC insurance.

== Prudential supervision and insurer risk ==
In a UK insured buyout, pension risks that were previously borne by a scheme and its sponsor are transferred to a life insurer, so prudential supervision focuses on whether insurers can support the annuity liabilities they have accepted. In 2026, the Bank of England said growth and innovation in the UK bulk purchase annuity market had made insurers' investment strategies and emerging risks a focus for the Prudential Regulation Authority, including resilience, transparency, and policyholder protection.

Bulk purchase annuity business is closely connected with insurers' matching adjustment portfolios. The Bank of England said in 2026 that assets in such portfolios must have fixed or highly predictable cashflows that are closely matched to liabilities, and that supervisors focus on how changing investment strategies could affect insurers' safety and soundness. It also said that about 40% of insurers' matching adjustment portfolios consisted of illiquid or non-traded assets, although life insurers were well placed to hold some such assets against long-term annuity liabilities.

Funded reinsurance is another prudential issue linked to buyout growth. The Prudential Regulation Authority describes funded reinsurance as a collateralised reinsurance contract that transfers both asset and liability risks from a portfolio of annuities to a reinsurer, often based offshore. In 2026, it said funded reinsurance exposures had increased significantly because of bulk purchase annuity growth, and that about 15% of recent new bulk purchase annuity business had been ceded through funded reinsurance arrangements.

The PRA has said continued growth in funded reinsurance exposures could lead to underestimated risks, with possible effects on the safety and soundness of UK insurers, policyholder protection, and the stability of the UK insurance industry. Its 2025 life insurance stress test found that a scenario in which firms recaptured exposures from their largest funded reinsurance counterparty reduced aggregate solvency coverage ratios by 10 percentage points and surplus capital by around £3 billion.

== Notable transactions ==
Large pension risk transfer transactions are sometimes cited as examples of how buyouts and buy-ins affect corporate sponsors, insurers, and pension members. Many large UK examples are buy-ins rather than completed buyouts, but they are included where the transaction insured all or a large part of a scheme, formed part of a phased route to buyout, or was described by reliable sources as unusually large.

Selected large or otherwise significant UK transactions include:

Year	Scheme or sponsor	Insurer	Value	Transaction type and significance
2018	British Airways Airways Pension Scheme	Legal & General	£4.4 billion	Buy-in covering nearly 22,000 pensioners. Legal & General described it as the largest bulk annuity policy arranged with a UK pension scheme at the time, including conversion of existing longevity insurance into a bulk annuity.
2019	Telent and the GEC 1972 Plan	Rothesay Life	£4.7 billion	Full buyout covering all 39,000 members. Pensions Age described it as a record full buyout and said the buyout would be preceded by a buy-in.
2019	Asda Group Pension Scheme	Rothesay Life	£3.8 billion	Buy-in arranged in anticipation of a full buyout of the scheme.
2023	RSA UK pension schemes	Pension Insurance Corporation	about £6.5 billion	Buy-in covering around 40,000 members. Pension Insurance Corporation described it as the largest bulk annuity transaction from pension schemes to an insurer at the time.
2023	British Steel Pension Scheme	Legal & General	£7.5 billion across four buy-ins	Phased buy-ins that insured all scheme liabilities. Pensions Age reported that the final £2.7 billion buy-in made the scheme the largest in the UK to have secured full insurance.
2023	Boots Pension Scheme	Legal & General	£4.8 billion	Full buy-in covering all 53,000 retirees and deferred members. Legal & General described it as the UK's largest single transaction of its kind by premium size.
2023	Co-operative Pension Scheme	Rothesay	£4 billion	Buy-in for the Co-op Section of the scheme. Rothesay described it as the final step to fully secure member benefits and said it covered almost 50,000 members.
2024	NatWest Group Pension Fund	Rothesay	£9.6 billion	Rothesay reported insuring a further £9.6 billion of liabilities with the NatWest Group Pension Fund during 2024.
2024	ICI Pension Fund	Multiple insurers	about £10 billion across 20 transactions	Phased buy-in programme. LCP described the ICI programme as a record £10 billion of buy-ins across 20 transactions.
2025	Rolls-Royce UK Pension Fund	Pension Insurance Corporation	£4.3 billion	Buy-in covering the fund's remaining liabilities to 36,000 people.
2025	Ford UK pension schemes	Legal & General	£4.6 billion	Buy-ins for two Ford-sponsored schemes covering more than 35,000 members. Legal & General described it as the largest UK pension risk transfer transaction announced in 2025.

Outside the United Kingdom, one early large United States example was General Motors' 2012 pension risk transfer. Reuters reported that the measures would cut about $26 billion from General Motors' US pension liability and included a group annuity contract with Prudential Financial for retirees who did not take, or were not eligible for, a lump-sum pension buyout.
