= Cheryl Schonhardt-Bailey =

Political scientist

Cheryl Schonhardt-Bailey FBA
- Born: June 5, 1961 (age 65); Idaho, U.S.
- Citizenship: United States; United Kingdom
- Spouse: Andrew Bailey
- Children: 2

Academic background
- Education: Boise State University (BSc); University of California, Los Angeles (MA, PhD)
- Thesis: A model of trade policy liberalization : looking inside the British "hegemon" of the nineteenth century (1991)

Academic work
- Discipline: Political Science
- Institutions: London School of Economics and Political Science
- Doctoral students: Fabio Franchino
- Website: https://personal.lse.ac.uk/schonhar/

Cheryl Schonhardt-Bailey, FBA (born June 5, 1961) is an American-British professor of political science at the London School of Economics and Political Science. She served as the LSE's Head of the Department of Government from 2019 to 2022.

== Biography ==
Schonhardt-Bailey is from Idaho in the western United States and obtained a bachelor of arts degree in political science from Boise State University. She earned both a master of arts and doctorate of philosophy degrees in political science from the University of California, Los Angeles.

She has published books and articles on British trade policy in the nineteenth century, such as From the Corn Laws to Free Trade: Interests, Ideas, and Institutions in Historical Perspective. Her articles have appeared in the American Political Science Review, World Politics, the British Journal of Political Science, Political Analysis, PS: Political Science and Politics, and Parliamentary History.

Her current research interests include the quantification and spatial analysis of textual data in the form of political deliberation, particularly in monetary policy making settings (e.g., the United States Congress, the Federal Open Market Committee). She also writes about the speeches of prominent politicians including George W. Bush, Margaret Thatcher and Ronald Reagan.

She was elected a fellow of the British Academy in 2015.

== Personal life ==
She is married to Andrew Bailey, current Governor of the Bank of England. They have two children and live in London, England.

== Publications ==
- Deliberating American Monetary Policy: A Textual Analysis Cheryl Schonhardt. Bailey, MIT Press. 2013. ISBN 9780262019576.
- Battles Over Free Trade: Anglo-American Experiences with International Trade, 1776-2006. Pickering & Chatto Publishers Ltd. 2008. ISBN 1851969357.
- Free Trade: The Repeal of the Corn Laws Cheryl Schonhardt-Bailey. MIT Press. 2006. ISBN 0-262-19543-7.
- From the Corn Laws to Free Trade: Interests, Ideas, and Institutions in Historical Perspective Cheryl Schonhardt-Bailey. MIT Press. 2006. ISBN 0-262-19543-7.
- McGillivray, Fiona; McLean, Iain; Pahre, Robert; Schonhardt-Bailey, Cheryl (2002). International Trade and Political Institutions: Instituting Trade in the Long 19th Century. Cheltenham. ISBN 1-84064-690-X.
- Schonhardt-Bailey, Cheryl (1997). The Rise of Free Trade, in 4 volumes. Routledge. ISBN 0415140315.
