= Caroline Criado Perez =

British feminist author, journalist and activist (born 1984)

Caroline Criado Perez OBE
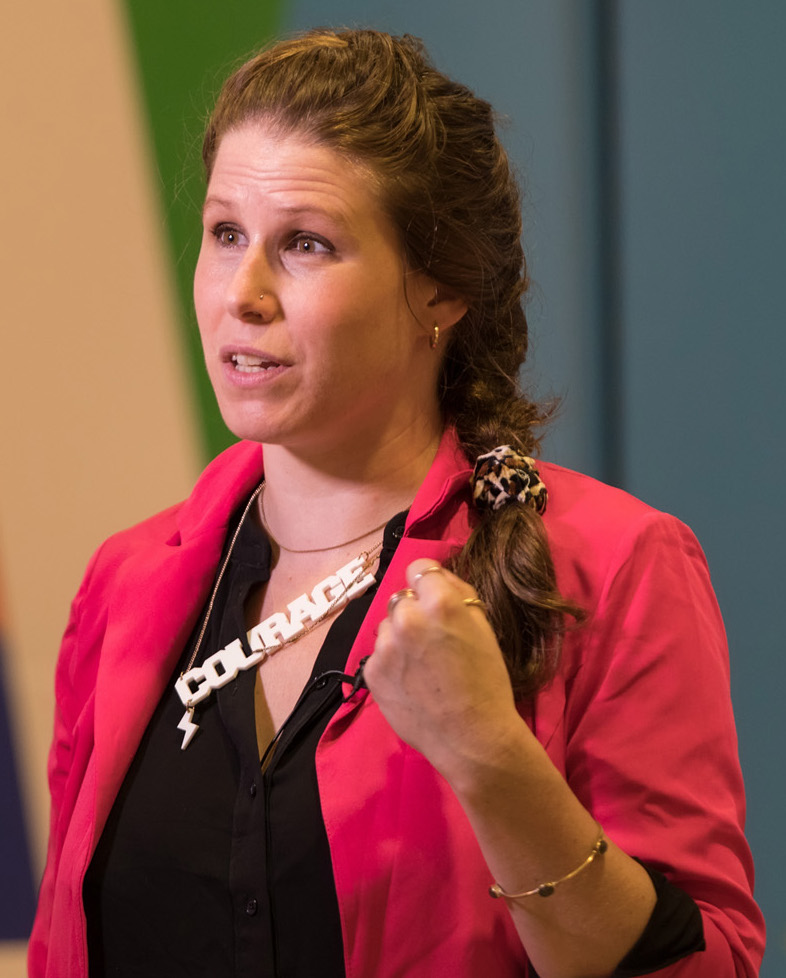
- Criado Perez speaking at a conference of the Open Data Institute in 2019
- Born: Caroline Emma Criado Perez; 1984 (age 41–42); Brazil
- Education: Oundle School; Keble College, Oxford; London School of Economics
- Occupation: Journalist
- Website: www.carolinecriadoperez.com

Caroline Emma Criado Perez OBE (born 1984) is a British feminist author, journalist and activist. Her first national campaign, the Women's Room project, aimed to increase the presence of female experts in the media. She opposed the removal of the only woman from British banknotes (other than Queen Elizabeth II), leading to the Bank of England's swift announcement that the image of Jane Austen would appear on the £10 note by 2017. That campaign led to sustained harassment on the social networking website Twitter of Criado Perez and other women; as a result, Twitter announced plans to improve its complaint procedures. Her most recent campaign was for a sculpture of a woman in Parliament Square; the statue of Millicent Fawcett was unveiled in April 2018, as part of the centenary celebrations of the winning of women's suffrage in the United Kingdom. Her 2019 book Invisible Women: Exposing Data Bias in a World Designed for Men was a Sunday Times bestseller.

== Early life and education ==
Born in Brazil, she is the daughter of Carlos Criado Perez, an Argentinian-born businessman and former CEO of the Safeway supermarket chain in the UK, and Alison[last name?], an English registered nurse who has worked with Medecins Sans Frontieres on a number of humanitarian aid missions. The family lived in several countries during her childhood, including Spain, Portugal and Taiwan, as well as the UK. When Criado Perez was 11, her father moved to the Netherlands and she began to board at Oundle School, a public school in Northamptonshire, England. She disliked what she described as a bullying culture there.

Criado Perez spent a year at university in London, then abandoned a history course. Having developed a passion for opera during her teens, she wanted to become an opera singer, and various jobs subsidised her singing lessons.

Criado Perez worked in digital marketing for some years, then studied for an English Literature A-level. She gained a place to study English Language and Literature at Keble College, Oxford as a mature student, graduating from Oxford University in 2012. Study of language and gender and a book by Deborah Cameron discussing gender's relationship to pronouns, led to Criado Perez becoming an active feminist.

She was a runner-up in the London Library Student Writing competition in 2012, receiving £1,000 and other prizes. Since then, she worked, in 2012, as an editor for an information and networking portal of the pharmaceutical industry and in 2013 was in the process of completing a master's degree in Gender Studies from the London School of Economics.

In a June 2013 profile by journalist Cathy Newman in The Telegraph, Criado Perez commented: "the culture we live in is made up of little tiny sexist acts which you can just ignore but when you think of them collectively you start to see a pattern."

== Campaigns ==
=== Female representation in the media ===
In November 2012, with Catherine Smith, she founded the website Women's Room, to collect names of female professionals ready to speak to the media, and to persuade journalists to increase the proportion of women among their interviewees. The immediate reason for this development were two features on the BBC Radio 4 Today programme broadcast on consecutive days in October 2012, on the prevention of teenage pregnancies and breast cancer, in which no female expert was interviewed – the interviewers were also male. As a result, presenter John Humphrys had to ask during the latter item: "if you were a woman you would have no hesitation about being screened"? One of the interviewees on the item about teenage pregnancies was Anthony Seldon, the headmaster of Wellington College, a public school. Criado Perez wrote that Seldon might be an authority on contemporary British political history, but not on the immediate subject under discussion. She commented on the rather narrow selection of voices, on social lines as well as gender, in such broadcast debates in early November 2012: "These voices are shaping the debate, and they therefore wield a huge influence over our currently populist public policy. If public policy is going to be so responsive to the media, let's make the media truly representative of the public."

On the Wikipedia controversy in April 2013 concerning the creation of a sub-category for American women novelists, she was reported as saying: "It perpetuates the idea that men are the default and don't need to be marked in any way, whereas women are still seen as the outliers."

=== Women on banknotes ===
In another campaign, she criticised the Bank of England's decision to replace Elizabeth Fry with Winston Churchill on the £5 note, which left no women featured on the reverse of bank notes; the monarch, then Queen Elizabeth II, is depicted on the front of bank notes, with historically prominent people on the reverse. Dismissing Churchill as "another white man", Criado Perez pointed out that the Equality Act 2010 commits public institutions to "eliminate discrimination", whereas proof the Bank had acted with the required "due regard" was absent because details of the decision-making process were not made public. Criado Perez met Head of Notes Victoria Cleland and Chief Cashier Chris Salmon at the Bank to discuss it.

The campaign, which gained the support of 35,000 petitioners, and financial support for a potential legal challenge, led Mark Carney, the newly appointed Governor of the Bank of England, to announce that the image of Jane Austen would appear on a new £10 note, replacing that of Charles Darwin. "People have said this was not such a big thing to tackle, but I didn't especially pick on banknotes", Criado Perez commented to The Observer's Vanessa Thorpe. "I just saw the [proposed] new note and thought, 'I am not having this'. And the Bank of England is not a small institution." Jane Austen was not her preferred female historical figure, but Criado Perez still approved of the choice: "She spent her time poking fun at the establishment. All her books are about how women are trapped and misrepresented. It is really sad that she was saying that 200 years ago and I am still having to say that today".

In an article in the London Evening Standard in September 2017, Criado Perez wrote that she would donate her first "Austen tenner" to her local women's shelter: "It feels like the right way to end this chapter of my life". Others followed suit, donating their tenners to charities ranging from large ones such as Women's Aid to start-ups such as Bloody Good Period.

=== Harassment on social media ===
This decision by the Bank of England resulted in numerous threats, including threats of rape and murder, made against Criado Perez and other women on Twitter from the day of the Bank of England's announcement in July 2013. At this point, Criado Perez said that she was receiving about 50 such threats each hour, and found somewhat inadequate the suggestion that she fill in an online form for Twitter detailing the behaviour she had experienced. At the height of the abuse, Criado Perez "lost half a stone in two days" and "couldn't eat or sleep". She commented later: "I don't know if I had a kind of breakdown. I was unable to function, unable to have normal interactions."

While she felt it was taking over her life, Twitter at the time was assuming no responsibility for the content of tweets, merely advising users to contact the relevant authorities. Criado Perez said the campaign of abuse, provoked by a small issue, "shows it's not about what women are doing, not about feminism. It's that some men don't like women, and don't like women in the public domain." In her view: "Men get attacked because they've said or done something someone doesn't like, whereas women get attacked because they're visible."

The Labour MP Stella Creasy, who had been involved with Criado Perez in the bank note campaign, was amongst those who suffered similar criminal harassment. A man and a woman were arrested towards the end of July. An on-line petition calling on Twitter to introduce a button to enable site users to report abuse had gained 110,000 signatures by 2 August.

Criado Perez did not participate in the Twitter silence organised by Times journalist Caitlin Moran for 4 August to persuade the social media site to change its policies. "Sorry, but I won't be silenced by anyone", she said. Although she acknowledged that the boycott was a "mark of solidarity", she argued the need to "shout back" at trolls. On 3 August, Twitter's general manager in Britain, Tony Wang, announced a one-click option on all posts enabling users to easily report abusive tweets, and apologised to the women who had received abuse.

In September 2013, Criado Perez felt that the Metropolitan Police had not treated her honourably, and reported that they had lost evidence. The following day, the Metropolitan Police said they had not lost evidence in this case. Meanwhile, Criado Perez deleted her Twitter account for a time. On 16 December, it emerged that a woman and a man from Tyne and Wear would appear in court in early January having been charged with the improper use of a communications network. It was announced at this time that two other suspects were not going to be charged, and of a fifth a decision was yet to be made. On 7 January 2014, John Nimmo (25) and Isabella Sorley (23) pleaded guilty to the charges brought against them. Sorley was sentenced to 12 weeks and Nimmo 8 weeks on 24 January. When asked on the BBC's Newsnight programme in early January whether she was surprised that one of the convicted Twitter abusers was female, Criado Perez said that the woman in question had internalised misogyny already rampant in society as a whole. A second man, Peter Nunn, 33, was found guilty of sending threatening tweets to Creasy on 2 September, and was blocked from contacting either woman when he was imprisoned for 18 weeks on 29 September 2014.

As a result of her campaign against Twitter policies, columnist Owen Jones in July 2013 described Criado Perez as "a brilliant fighter".

After Jeremy Corbyn became Labour leader in September 2015, Criado Perez tweeted: "I really thought Corbyn would have the sense to give top [shadow] cabinet jobs to women. You're a white male leader with a white male deputy". Corbyn's shadow Chancellor, Foreign and Home Secretaries were also men. In the context of threatening behaviour suffered predominantly by female Labour MPs before and during the 2016 Labour leadership crisis, Criado Perez has written about the subject for The Pool website.

=== Statue of Millicent Fawcett ===
On 8 March 2016, International Women's Day, Criado Perez noticed the absence of any statue of a woman in Parliament Square, Westminster. The eleven statues, including Winston Churchill and Nelson Mandela, were all commemorating men.

She launched a campaign for a statue of a suffragette to be erected in Parliament Square for the centennial anniversary of the Representation of the People Act 1918. "If we lived in a fair world, historical, non-royal women would not make up a paltry 2,7 per cent of all the statues in the UK", she wrote in the New Statesman. "But we do not live in a fair world. And I'm realistic about the pace of change". Her open letter to the newly elected London Mayor Sadiq Khan, published by The Daily Telegraph the following May, was signed by a number of prominent women. Khan soon indicated his agreement to such a development, but did not at that stage commit to the location she wished, Parliament Square. A petition signed by 74,000 people was presented by Criado Perez in June at an event in the Speaker's House State Rooms hosted by the Fawcett Society, with Millicent Fawcett — not a suffragette but a suffragist — now suggested as the figure to be represented. Criado Perez agreed.

In April 2017, Khan announced that Gillian Wearing had been commissioned to create a statue of Fawcett. Prime Minister Theresa May also signalled her approval. Fawcett is the first woman to be featured as a statue in the Square, and Wearing is the first female sculptor to have a statue located there. Announcing the plan for the statue of Fawcett, Khan said: "It's simply not right that nearly a century after women's suffrage, Parliament Square is still a male-only zone, and I'm thrilled that this is soon to change thanks to Caroline's inspired campaign". The statue was unveiled on 24 April 2018 for the commemoration of the extension of the franchise to women in 1918 - though this extension was at first on unequal terms to men. On the plinth of the statue are the names and pictures of 55 women (and four men) who fought for women's right to vote.

== Invisible Women: Exposing Data Bias in a World Designed for Men ==
She wrote Invisible Women: Exposing Data Bias in a World Designed for Men (2019) that documents the gender disparities in society and how we live in a male-dominated world. The book has been translated into many languages, including French, German, Dutch, Italian, Spanish, Finnish, Portuguese, Polish, Romanian, Russian, Persian, Swedish, Icelandic, Danish, Greek, Lithuanian, Estonian, Czech, Slovak, Ukrainian, Turkish and Chinese.

== Honours ==
For her successful activism over depicting women on bank notes, Criado Perez won the human rights campaigner of the year award from the pressure group Liberty in November 2013. In 2013, she was also named one of BBC's 100 Women. She was appointed an Officer of the Order of the British Empire (OBE) in the 2015 Birthday Honours for services to equality and diversity, particularly in the media. In 2019, Criado Perez won the Royal Society Insight Investment Science Books Prize and the Financial Times Business Book of the Year award for Invisible Women: Exposing Data Bias in a World Designed for Men.

In April 2025, she won the inaugural Unwin Prize from the Publishers Association.

== Publications ==
- Criado Perez, Caroline (2015). Do It Like a Woman ... and Change the World. London: Portobello. ISBN 978-1-846-27581-4. OCLC 910165461. Wikidata ()
- Criado Perez, Caroline (2019). Invisible Women: Exposing Data Bias in a World Designed for Men. New York: Abrams. ISBN 978-1-683-35314-0. OCLC 1111651744.
