= Fabio Franchino =

Italian political scientist and professor

- Born: December 3, 1969 (age 56); Turin
- Occupation: Professor of Political Science
- Awards: EUSA Award for the best book published in 2007 or 2008

Academic background
- Education: London School of Economics and Political Science
- Thesis: Executive and bureaucratic politics in the European Union: Bureaucratic preferences, executive discretion and procedural control of the European Commission (2000)
- Doctoral advisor: Cheryl Schonhardt-Bailey

Academic work
- Discipline: Political Science
- Institutions: London School of Economics and Political Science; University College London; University of Milan
- Website: users2.unimi.it/fabiofranchino/

Fabio Franchino (born 3 December 1969) is an Italian political scientist, professor at the University of Milan. He is editor of the Italian Political Science Review and associate editor of European Union Politics. His areas of specialization are EU politics and policy, comparative politics, and policy analysis, and is author of influential publications in these fields.

== Early life and academic career ==
Franchino obtained an undergraduate degree from the University of Brighton, a master's from Universita Commerciale Luigi Bocconi in Milan, and a PhD from the London School of Economics and Political Science. His doctoral thesis, dated 2000, was titled Executive and bureaucratic politics in the European Union: Bureaucratic preferences, executive discretion and procedural control of the European Commission. He started his academic career at the London School of Economics and Political Science as a class teacher, tutorial fellow, and lecturer between 1997 and 2001. He then moved to University College London where he was lecturer and reader from 2002 to 2007, when he earned his chair at the University of Milan.

== Academic service ==
Franchino was elected president of the European Political Science Association for 2016-2018. He is also treasurer of the Standing Group on the European Union of the European Consortium for Political Research.

== Selected works ==
- The Powers of the Union: Delegation in the EU. Cambridge: Cambridge University Press (2007), p. 355. EUSA Award for the best book published in 2007 or 2008.
