= Nikhil Rathi =

British regulatory executive (born 1979)

Chief Executive of the Financial Conduct Authority
- Incumbent
- Assumed office 1 October 2020
- Preceded by: Andrew Bailey

Personal details
- Born: 5 August 1979 (age 47)
- Children: 3
- Education: St Anne's College, Oxford (BA)

Nikhil Rathi (born 5 August 1979) is a British financial regulator who has been the chief executive of the United Kingdom's Financial Conduct Authority (FCA) since 2020. He previously was CEO of the London Stock Exchange.

== Early life ==
Rathi is of Indian descent, and grew up in Barrow-in-Furness, Cumbria, the son of Madhu and Dr Rajendra Rathi, a local magistrate, having moved there aged three. He was educated at Chetwynde School, followed by St Anne's College, Oxford, where he earned a first-class degree in Philosophy, Politics and Economics. He was the Cumbria under-12 tennis champion.

== Career ==
From 2005 to 2008, Rathi was Private Secretary to UK Prime Ministers Tony Blair and Gordon Brown.

Rathi worked for HM Treasury from 2009 to 2014, and was director of the financial services group, leading the UK's EU and international financial services interests.

In May 2014, Rathi joined the London Stock Exchange (LSE) as chief of staff and director of international development, and in 2015, was appointed CEO, working under Group CEO Xavier Rolet.

In June 2020, HM Treasury appointed Rathi to be the new chief executive at the UK’s Financial Conduct Authority, succeeding Andrew Bailey, after his appointment as the Governor at the Bank of England in March 2020, and Christopher Woolard, who acted as interim CEO. He took up the post on 1 October 2020. In April 2025, Rathi was reappointed for another five year term until september 2030. This reappointment marked the first time an FCA chief executive received a second full term.

== Personal life ==
Rathi is married, has three children, and lives in London.
