= Tracey McDermott =

UK financial services executive

Tracey Elizabeth McDermott CBE was the acting chief executive of Britain's Financial Conduct Authority (FCA) from September 2015 until 1 July 2016.

== Career ==
From 2001 she was employed at the Financial Services Authority as director of supervision and authorisations and director of enforcement and financial crime. She became a board member in April 2013. She was a non-executive director of the Prudential Regulatory Authority from September 2015 to June 2016 and has also been a member of the Financial Policy Committee of the Bank of England.

In January 2016 she robustly rejected widespread suggestions that a decision by the FCA (announced on 31 December 2015) to scrap an inquiry and report into possible causal links between financial incentives for bankers and the role of the British banks in the 2008 financial crisis was the result of government instructions or other related pressures on the operational entity for which she is accountable.

In January 2017 McDermott joined Standard Chartered as a group head with responsibility for corporate affairs & brand. From March 2018 she also had responsibility for compliance.

== Awards ==
McDermott was appointed Commander of the Order of the British Empire (CBE) in the 2016 Birthday Honours for services to financial services consumers and markets.

She is an honorary professor at Queen Mary University of London.

== Personal life ==
McDermott studied at Queen Mary University of London School of Law. She trained in law, qualifying as a solicitor in 1995 and initially worked in private practice with law firms in the UK, USA and Brussels. She is married to a professor of Imperial College London, Spencer Sherwin, and they have two children.
