= Charles Randell =

British regulatory executive (born 1958)

Charles David Randell CBE (born June 1958) became chairman of Britain's Financial Conduct Authority and Chair of the Payments Systems Regulator in April 2018. Charles has been a key supporter of transforming the FCA into a data-led regulator, and speaks widely of the need to exploit new data and digital capabilities to help regulators become more efficient and effective. He was appointed Commander of the Order of the British Empire (CBE) in the 2016 New Year Honours for services to Financial Stability and Climate Change Policy.

Prior to this appointment he had been an external member of the Prudential Regulation Committee. He was a Partner at Slaughter and May from 1989 to 2013 specialising in corporate finance law.
