= Victoria Cleland =

British banker (born 1970)

Chief Cashier of the Bank of England
- In office March 2025 – 19 October 2026
- Preceded by: Sarah John
- Succeeded by: Rhys Phillips
- In office March 2014 – 1 June 2018
- Preceded by: Chris Salmon
- Succeeded by: Sarah John

Personal details
- Born: February 26, 1970 (age 56) Warwick, Warwickshire, England
- Education: University of Oxford; Imperial College London

Victoria Mary Florence Cleland (born 26 February 1970) is a British banker. She was the Director for Banknotes and Chief Cashier of the Bank of England from March 2025 to October 2026, a position she previously held from March 2014 until 1 June 2018, when she was replaced by Sarah John (the third woman to be named as Chief Cashier). She is the second woman to hold the post of Chief Cashier. She replaced Chris Salmon when he was appointed as Executive Director for Markets at the Bank of England in 2014. Before her re-appointment as Chief Cashier, she was the Executive Director for Payments for the Bank of England. On 19 October 2026 was replaced as Chief Cashier by Rhys Phillips.

== Education ==
Cleland studied philosophy, politics and economics at the University of Oxford and was sponsored by the bank for an MBA degree at Imperial College, London.

== Career ==
Cleland has worked for the bank for about 20 years having first tried accountancy as a career. Her first role at the bank was in a department dealing with the financing of small businesses, followed by work in the wholesale market supervision division after which she moved to deal with graduate recruitment.

Cleland worked for three years on financial stability after which she set up the "special resolutions" section, which dealt with banks at risk of failure following the recent financial crisis. She was closely involved with the Northern Rock nationalisation.

Cleland was Head of Notes from March 2010 and has been Director for Banknotes and Chief Cashier from March 2014. In that role, Cleland was primarily responsible for ensuring that banks had the right number and type of notes available at all times. She was also responsible for measures to prevent forgery and the controversial matter of the design of new notes. In 2013, Cleland received, on behalf of the Bank of England, a petition organised by Caroline Criado Perez to keep a woman on the reverse of Bank of England banknotes. To date, other than the portrait of Queen Elizabeth II on the obverse of Bank of England notes, Jane Austen on the reverse of the current polymer £10 note is the third historical woman depicted on a Bank of England note. The previous two historical women were Elizabeth Fry on the last paper £5 note from 2002 until May 2017 and Florence Nightingale on the £10 from 1975 until 1994.

Cleland's signature appears on all Bank of England banknotes issued during her tenure as Chief Cashier..

Cleland was present at Spink London on 3 October 2016 for the charity auction of Bank of England banknotes, all bearing her signature as Chief Cashier. The auction consisted of first-run prefixes and low serial numbered banknotes of all denominations but was primarily timed to coincide with the recent launch and high demand amongst collectors for the new polymer £5 banknote. The lowest numbered polymer £5 banknote available to the general public was AA01 000017. This was sold for £4,150 with Cleland opening the charity auction and acting as auctioneer for this first lot. This was the fourth charity auction instigated by the Bank of England and the first for banknotes issued under Cleland as Chief Cashier.

In March 2025, it was announced that Cleland had been re-appointed Chief Cashier of the Bank of England, replacing Sarah John, who was appointed the Bank of England's Chief Operating Officer.

== Outside banking ==
Cleland has been a trustee of the Royal London Society for Blind People since 2012.

In February 2018, during an interview with The Guardian, Cleland revealed that she does not use contactless payment cards, in part because she was yet to trust the technology fully. Cleland pointed out that this was a personal opinion and not the official view of the Bank of England.
