= Invisible Women: Exposing Data Bias in a World Designed for Men =

2019 book by Caroline Criado Perez

- Cover of the first edition
- Author: Caroline Criado Perez
- Language: English
- Publisher: Chatto & Windus
- Publication date: 2019
- Publication place: Great Britain

Invisible Women: Exposing Data Bias in a World Designed for Men is a 2019 book by British feminist author Caroline Criado Perez. The book describes the adverse effects on women caused by gender bias in big data collection.

== Reception ==
The book received both the Royal Society Insight Investment Science Book Prize and the Financial Times and McKinsey Business Book of the Year Award in 2019. It has on the whole been welcomed and positively reviewed in major publications.

This book is described by Cordelia Fine and Victor Sojo in The Lancet as providing "several fascinating case studies—from domains as varied as medicine, occupational health and safety, transport, technology, politics, and disaster relief".

Carol Tavris reviewed it for Skeptical Inquirer Magazine, stating that the "theoretical underpinning of this book is not new; every generation of feminist scholars rediscovers Simone de Beauvoir's 1949 observations that women are the second sex", referring to the French philosopher's book.

Angela Saini reviewed it in The Guardian, calling it "a dossier on gender inequality that demands urgent action." The book makes clear, she writes that "women aren't a minority. They are the majority. They are absolutely everywhere and always have been. Yet as Criado Perez shows, women must live in a society built around men. From a lack of streetlights to allow us to feel safe, to an absence of workplace childcare facilities, almost everything seems to have been designed for the average white working man and the average stay-at-home white woman. Her answer is to think again, to collect more data, study that data, and ask women what they want." Still, writes Saini, for all the data that Criado Perez presents, "What should worry us more than the data gap, then, is that huge and seemingly intractable don't-give-a-damn gap."

In an article for Literary Review magazine titled 'Female Unfriendly', feminist author Joan Smith, lauds the book as essential reading, at least for those to whom Criado Perez's findings will be news. "This book, which demonstrates the bias men enjoy in both familiar (to me at least) and less obvious scenarios, sets the record straight. I knew, for instance, that women fare worse after heart attacks because they present with different symptoms from men; Criado Perez cites research showing that women are 50 per cent more likely to be misdiagnosed because they tend not to have the classic 'Hollywood heart attack', which begins with chest and left-arm pains. But I didn't realise that women are also more likely to suffer serious injuries in a car crash because crash test dummies have traditionally been designed to reflect the 'average' male body." Smith concludes that "The cumulative effect of all this evidence is devastating, even if it confirms what most women already know."

Invisible Women also found a wide international audience, and has been translated into many languages, including French, German, Dutch, Italian, Spanish, Polish, Finnish, Portuguese, Persian, Swedish, Icelandic, Danish, Greek, Lithuanian, Estonian, Czech, Slovak, Ukrainian, Turkish, Russian and Chinese.
