= Financial Conduct Authority =

British financial regulator

Agency overview
- Formed: 1 April 2013
- Preceding agency: Financial Services Authority
- Jurisdiction: United Kingdom
- Headquarters: 12 Endeavour Square London E20 1JN
- Annual budget: £758.3m (2023/2024)
- Website: www.fca.org.uk

The Financial Conduct Authority (FCA) is a financial regulatory body in the United Kingdom. It operates independently of the UK Government and is financed by charging fees to members of the financial services industry. The FCA regulates financial firms providing services to consumers, and maintains the integrity of the financial markets in the United Kingdom.

The FCA was created by the Financial Services Act 2012 and began work on 1 April 2013, replacing the Financial Services Authority (FSA). The FCA became the consumer credit regulator in 2014.

It focuses on the regulation of conduct by both retail and wholesale financial services firms. The FCA is structured as a company limited by guarantee. The FCA can set rules and minimum standards for financial firms and products, and it can investigate firms and individuals. It can ban a financial product, order firms to withdraw or change misleading promotions, and freeze the assets of people or organisations under investigation. It also registers cryptoasset businesses so it can supervise them for money laundering.

The FCA has been criticised on several occasions. In 2013, a parliamentary commission said the FCA and its predecessor had responded inadequately to the mis-selling of interest rate swaps to small businesses. In 2014, an independent report found weaknesses in how the FCA handled price-sensitive information after details of its business plan were briefed to the press. A 2024 report by a cross-party group of MPs and peers, followed by a second report in 2025, said the FCA was slow to act and that its leaders were not accountable enough.

The FCA works alongside the Prudential Regulation Authority and the Financial Policy Committee to set regulatory requirements for the financial sector.

== History ==
The Financial Services Act 2012 came into force on 1 April 2013. The Act created a new regulatory framework for financial services and abolished the Financial Services Authority. Specifically, the Act gave the Bank of England responsibility for financial stability, bringing together macro and micro prudential regulation, and created a new regulatory structure consisting of the Bank of England's Financial Policy Committee, the Prudential Regulation Authority and the Financial Conduct Authority.

On 26 October 2015, the FCA brought in rules banning regulated financial services firms from offering premium rate 084, 087 or 09 telephone numbers for customer contact.

With effect from 14 September 2019, the FCA introduced strong customer authentication rules as required by the Revised Directive on Payment Services (PSD2), aiming to reduce fraud and improve security by requiring payment services providers to use two of the following three types of authentication when customers make online payments over €30 in the EEA:

- PIN code or a password
- Biometrics such as a fingerprint
- Physical device such as a phone.

The FCA published new Listing Rules in 2024, aiming to simplify the UK listings regime, marking the most significant changes in over three decades. These rules, effective from 29 July 2024, created a single listing category and streamlined eligibility criteria to encourage a wider range of companies to issue shares in the UK.

=== Payment Systems Regulator ===
In April 2015, the FCA created a separate entity, the Payment Systems Regulator (PSR), in accordance with section 40 of the Financial Services (Banking Reform) Act 2013. The PSR's role is "to promote competition and innovation in payment systems, and ensure they work in the interests of the organisations and people that use them". Part 5 of the Financial Services (Banking Reform) Act 2013 (regulation of payment systems) was amended in 2015, removing "an unintended restriction on the ability of the PSR to exercise its powers for the purpose of requiring access to be granted to systems designated under the Settlement Finality Directive". After this, the PSR's powers applied to any payment system to which the access provisions of the Payment Services Directive of 2007 applied.

From May 2019 some victims of authorized push payment fraud are eligible to receive a refund under the Contingent Reimbursement Model Scheme, a voluntary scheme overseen by the Payment Systems Regulator that provides protections for customers of signatory firms, subject to a number of exclusions.

=== Anti-money laundering supervision ===
The Office for Professional Body Anti-Money Laundering Supervision (OPBAS) is based within the FCA. It was established in January 2018 to oversee the 22 accountancy and legal professional bodies which supervise anti-money laundering compliance in view of the Money Laundering Act 2017.

== Powers ==
The authority has significant powers, including the power to regulate conduct related to the marketing of financial products. It is able to specify minimum standards and to place requirements on products. It has the power to investigate organisations and individuals. In addition, the FCA is able to ban financial products for up to a year while considering an indefinite ban. It has the power to instruct firms to immediately retract or modify promotions which it finds to be misleading and to publish such decisions.

Furthermore, the FCA is able to freeze assets of individuals or organisations under investigation, regardless of whether they are innocent or guilty. The authority has been responsible for regulating the consumer credit industry since 1 April 2014, taking over the role from the Office of Fair Trading.

In July 2023, the FCA announced reforms aiming to curb the use of social media by 'finfluencers' to encourage the purchasing of harmful financial products by UK consumers. Among the reforms was a ban on crypto incentives, such as 'refer a friend' bonuses, a compulsion for finfluencers to have clear risk warnings and for products to have a 24-hour cooling period to give first-time investors the time to adequately consider their investment decision. The move came following a significant rise in social media promotion of financial products by finfluencers in 2022, with 14 times more having been posted than the previous year.

== Sectors and firms ==
=== Banks ===
The Financial Services Act of 2012 set out a new system for regulating financial services in order to protect and improve the UK's economy. The FCA supervises banks to ensure they treat customers fairly, encourage innovation and healthy competition, and help the FCA to identify potential risks early so they can take action to reduce risks.

=== Mutual societies ===
There are more than 10,000 mutual societies in the United Kingdom. The FCA are responsible for registering new mutual societies, keeping public records, and receiving annual returns.

=== Financial advisers ===
Beginning 31 December 2012, independent financial advisers (IFAs) are legally obliged to follow Retail Distribution Review (RDR) rules. In order to be classed as an IFA, a business must offer a broad range of retail investment products and give consumers unbiased and unrestricted advice based on comprehensive and fair market analysis.

=== SIPP providers ===
In June 2026, the FCA announced plans to set out clear standards for due diligence required of self-invested personal pension (SIPP) providers. The FCA are also proposing new rules for handling pension scheme money and assets to reduce the risk of consumer harm when firms fail. The announcement has been praised, with the Roxton Wealth IFA stating that SIPPs need "tougher, clearer standards".

=== Cryptoasset Service Providers ===
FCA serves as the anti-money laundering and counter-terrorist financing (AML/CTF) supervisor for cryptoasset businesses under the Money Laundering, Terrorist Financing and Transfer of Funds (Information on the Payer) Regulations 2017 (MLRs). Any firm intending to carry out cryptoasset activities within the UK must register with the FCA prior to commencing operations. Failure to register or comply with the MLRs can result in enforcement actions, including potential criminal and civil penalties.

== Financial Regulators Complaints Commissioner ==
The Financial Regulators Complaints Commissioner (FRCC) serves as an independent body that handles complaints specifically against the Financial Conduct Authority (FCA). This means that if individuals or organizations are dissatisfied with the way the FCA has handled a situation, made a decision, or conducted its duties, they can escalate their complaint to the FRCC for an impartial assessment.

The FRCC provides a mechanism for individuals and entities to seek redress if they believe the FCA has acted improperly or unfairly. The body examines the complaint independently of the FCA, reviewing the evidence and determining whether the FCA acted reasonably and fairly in the circumstances.

The FRCC's remit in relation to the FCA includes complaints about a wide range of issues related to the FCA's regulatory functions, such as:

- How the FCA handled a specific case or investigation
- Delays or inefficiencies in the FCA's processes
- The conduct or professionalism of FCA staff
- The FCA's policies or procedures.

== Leadership ==
=== Chief executive ===
In February 2011, it was confirmed that the new head of the FCA would be Martin Wheatley, formerly chairman of Hong Kong's Securities and Futures Commission. However, Wheatley's appointment was not put in front of the Treasury Select Committee for a pre-appointment hearing. Instead, the Government stated it would put Wheatley and future chief executives forward for a pre-commencement hearing, i.e. after they had been formally appointed but before they began the role.

In July 2015, Wheatley resigned his post after he was criticised by the chancellor, George Osborne. In September 2015, Tracey McDermott took over from Wheatley as acting chief executive.

Andrew Bailey was appointed chief executive in January 2016. After Bailey became Governor of the Bank of England, it was announced that Christopher Woolard would be the interim chief executive. In June 2020, it was announced that Woolard would be succeeded on a permanent basis by Nikhil Rathi. In April 2025 Rathi was reappointed for a second five-year term, until 2030.

=== List of chief executives ===
#	Name	Tenure	Tenure start	Tenure end	Tenure length
1	Martin Wheatley	2013–2015	1 April 2013	11 September 2015	2 years and 164 days
–	Tracey McDermott (interim)	2015–2016	12 September 2015	30 June 2016	293 days
2	Andrew Bailey	2016–2020	1 July 2016	15 March 2020	3 years and 259 days
–	Christopher Woolard (interim)	2020	16 March 2020	30 September 2020	199 days
3	Nikhil Rathi	2020–	1 October 2020	Incumbent	6 years and 50 days

=== Chair ===
In June 2012, it was confirmed that John Griffith-Jones would become the non executive chair of the FCA once the FSA ceased operations in 2013. Griffith-Jones joined the FSA board in September 2012, as a non executive director and deputy chair.

Charles Randell became chair of the FCA and PSR in April 2018. In October 2021, he resigned from this position and was scheduled to leave the post in Spring 2022.

In February 2022, Richard Lloyd was named to begin serving as interim FCA chair from June 2022.

==== List of chairs ====
#	Name	Tenure
1	John Griffith-Jones	2013–2018
2	Charles Randell	2018–2022
–	Richard Lloyd (interim)	2022–2023
3	Ashley Alder	2023–

== Criticism ==
In June 2013, the Financial Conduct Authority was criticised by the Parliamentary Commission on Banking Standards in their report "Changing Banking for Good", which stated:

The interest rate swap scandal has cost small businesses dear. Many had no concept of the instrument they were being pressured to buy. This applies to embedded swaps as much as standalone products. The response by the FSA and FCA has been inadequate. If, as they claim, the regulators do not have the power to deal with these abuses, then it is for the Government and Parliament to ensure that the regulators have the powers they need to enable restitution to be made for this egregious mis-selling.—"Changing Banking for Good: Report of the Parliamentary Commission on Banking Standards", House of Lords, House of Commons

The FCA was rebuked by the Treasury Select Committee for lack of concern over the increase in mortgage interest rates of the Bank of Ireland's subsidiary of the United Kingdom.

There had been calls for the resignation of chairman John Griffith-Jones because of his responsibility for auditing HBOS as chairman of KPMG at the time of the 2008 financial crisis. There has also been criticism of Chief Executive Martin Wheatley because of his responsibility for the minibond fiasco in Hong Kong.

On 10 December 2014, the FCA released a report from Simon Davis from Clifford Chance LLP inquiring into the events of 27/28 March 2014 relating to the press briefing of information in the FCA's 2014/15 Business Plan.

The report recommended:

- That there be substantial improvement in the procedures relating to the identification, control and release of price-sensitive information,
- That the final version of the FCA's Business Plan should only be made available publicly to all market participants at the same time,
- That the relevant review team address the issue of price-sensitive information in any assessment of a potential thematic review, and
- That the FCA urgently put in place price and volume monitoring procedures, combined with an action plan for the effective management of the FCA's reaction to any issues involving the uncontrolled release of price-sensitive information originating from or involving the FCA.

On 16 December 2014, the Treasury select committee commenced taking evidence on the press briefing. Shortly thereafter, committee chair Andrew Tyrie said it looked as if the FCA had been guilty of an "extraordinary blunder" and had created a "disorderly market" through its actions.

A 2024 report by the All-Party Parliamentary Group on Investment Fraud and Fairer Financial Services, based on evidence from fraud victims, whistleblowers, and former FCA staff, heavily criticized the FCA, labelling it:

"incompetent at best, dishonest at worst."

The report, compiled after a series of financial scandals where the FCA was accused of inaction, found "very significant shortcomings" in the regulator. It details "tragic tales of regulatory failure" and highlights a "profoundly defective" culture and leadership within the FCA, where whistleblowers are poorly treated, and challenges to the "official line" are met with bullying. The APPG concluded that the FCA's actions are slow and inadequate, and its leaders are opaque and unaccountable, despite the critical need for effective consumer protection given the scale of financial crime in the UK. The report suggests reforms including a supervisory council, funding changes, removal of civil liability immunity, and potentially a new leadership team, even hinting at a more radical overhaul of financial regulation if improvements are not seen.

The same All-Party Parliamentary Group released in 2025 a supplementary report criticizing the FCA's consumer protection performance. This follows the APPG's disappointment with the FCA's response to its November 2024 report. The second report accuses the FCA of failing to engage with the APPG's concerns, dismissing criticisms as historic, and making unsubstantiated claims about stakeholder satisfaction.

== See also ==
- FCA Controlled Functions – Financial service code names
- Financial Policy Committee – Committee of the Bank of England
- Financial Services Authority – 2001–2013 UK quasi-judicial body
- Fraud Advisory Panel – UK charitable organization
- Prudential Regulation Authority – United Kingdom financial services regulator
- List of financial supervisory authorities by country
