= Chris Salmon =

Banker

Chief Cashier of the Bank of England
- In office 2011–2014
- Preceded by: Andrew Bailey
- Succeeded by: Victoria Cleland

Chris Salmon is an English banker. He is a former the Executive Director for Markets at the Bank of England. Between 2011 and 2014 he was Chief Cashier of the Bank of England, meaning that his signature appears on British banknotes from those years. Salmon was succeeded as Chief Cashier by Victoria Cleland.
