= Prudential Regulation Authority =

United Kingdom financial services regulator

- Abbreviation: PRA
- Predecessor: Financial Services Authority
- Formation: 1 April 2013
- Headquarters: 20 Moorgate; London; EC2R 6DA
- Region served: United Kingdom
- Key people: Andrew Bailey, governor of the Bank of England; Sam Woods, deputy governor of the Bank of England and chief executive
- Main organ: Prudential Regulation Committee
- Parent organisation: Bank of England
- Website: www.bankofengland.co.uk/prudential-regulation
- Formerly called: Prudential Regulation Authority Limited

The Prudential Regulation Authority (PRA) is a United Kingdom financial services regulatory body, formed as one of the successors to the Financial Services Authority (FSA). The authority is responsible for the prudential regulation and supervision of banks, building societies, credit unions, insurers and major investment firms. It sets standards and supervises financial institutions at the level of the individual firm. Although it was initially structured as a limited company wholly owned by the Bank of England, the PRA's functions have now been taken over by the Bank and are exercised through the Prudential Regulation Committee. The company has since been liquidated.

The PRA was created by the Financial Services Act 2012 and formally began operating alongside the new Financial Conduct Authority on 1 April 2013. As the Bank of England is operationally independent of the Government of the United Kingdom, the PRA is a quasi-governmental regulator, rather than an arm of the government per se. The PRA has its main offices at 20 Moorgate, near the Bank of England's central offices on Threadneedle Street.

== Role ==
The PRA's role is defined in terms of two statutory objectives: to promote the safety and soundness of the firms it regulates and, specifically for insurers, to contribute to the securing of an appropriate degree of protection for policyholders (section 12 of the PRA Statement of Policy). In promoting safety and soundness, the PRA focuses primarily on the harm that firms can cause to the stability of the UK financial system. A stable financial system is one in which firms continue to provide critical financial services – a precondition for a healthy and successful economy.

It will have close working relationships with other parts of the Bank, including the Financial Policy Committee and the Special Resolution Unit. The PRA's most significant supervisory decisions are taken by the Prudential Regulation Committee – comprising the Governor of the Bank of England, the Deputy Governor for Financial Stability, the Deputy Governor for Monetary Policy, the Deputy Governor for Markets & Banking, the chief executive officer of the PRA (and Deputy Governor for Prudential Regulation) and independent non-executive members.

The PRA's approach to regulation and supervision has three characteristics:

- A judgement-based approach: The PRA will use judgement in determining whether financial firms are safe and sound, whether insurers provide appropriate protection for policyholders and whether firms continue to meet the threshold conditions.
- A forward-looking approach: The PRA will assess firms not just against current risks, but also against those that could plausibly arise in the future. Where the PRA judges it necessary to intervene, it will generally aim to do so at an early stage.
- A focused approach: The PRA will focus on those issues and those firms that pose the greatest risk to the stability of the UK financial system and policyholders.

The PRA approach to supervision will not seek to operate a "zero-failure" regime. Rather, the PRA will seek to ensure that a financial firm which fails does so in a way that avoids significant disruption to the supply of critical financial services.

=== List of chief executives ===
The chief executive of the PRA is also the Bank of England Deputy Governor for Prudential Regulation. The following is a list of chief executives since the PRA's inception:

Name	Period
Andrew Bailey	2013–16
Sam Woods	2016–

== History ==
From 1 April 2013, the Prudential Regulatory Authority, alongside the Financial Conduct Authority, replaced the Financial Services Authority.

In response to the onset of the COVID-19 pandemic in the United Kingdom in March 2020, the PRA sent a formal request to the seven largest British lenders to suspend dividends and share repurchases until the end of the year.

== Climate-related financial risk ==
In April 2019 the PRA published supervisory statement SS3/19, Enhancing banks' and insurers' approaches to managing the financial risks from climate change, which set out expectations for governance, risk management, scenario analysis and disclosure of climate-related risks by regulated firms.

Following consultation paper CP10/25, the PRA published policy statement PS25/25 on 3 December 2025, together with supervisory statement SS5/25, Enhancing banks' and insurers' approaches to managing climate-related risks. SS5/25 replaced SS3/19 in its entirety and took effect on the date of publication. The PRA received 59 responses to the consultation.

The statement applies to UK banks, building societies, PRA-designated investment firms, and insurance and reinsurance firms and groups, including the Society of Lloyd's and managing agents. It does not apply to branches of overseas entities operating in the United Kingdom; the scope is unchanged from SS3/19.

=== Expectations ===
SS5/25 covers governance, risk management, climate scenario analysis, data and disclosures, with additional chapters addressing banking-specific and insurance-specific matters. For banks these include the integration of climate-related risks into the internal capital adequacy assessment process and the internal liquidity adequacy assessment process; for insurers they include the Own Risk and Solvency Assessment and stress testing. The PRA has stated that climate-related risks should be managed within firms' existing governance and risk management frameworks rather than treated as a separate specialism, and confirmed that the statement does not create a new senior management function for climate risk.

Firms were expected to complete an internal review of their position against the expectations, and to develop plans to address any gaps identified, within six months of commencement. The PRA clarified in PS25/25 that this was a review period rather than an implementation deadline, and that it did not expect firms to have closed identified gaps within it; supervisors would not request evidence of the reviews or resulting action plans until after the six-month period had ended.

The PRA said it would invite the Climate Financial Risk Forum, a joint industry body convened with the Financial Conduct Authority, to update and consolidate its guidance and tools to support implementation.

=== Litigation risk ===
SS3/19 had treated climate-related litigation risk as a subset of physical and transition risk. Responding to consultation feedback, the PRA noted that international standard setters diverge on the question — the Basel Committee on Banking Supervision treats litigation risk as a subset of physical and transition risk, while the International Association of Insurance Supervisors treats it as a distinct transmission channel, and the Financial Stability Board recognises that it may arise either way. SS5/25 accordingly allows firms to apply judgement as to whether litigation risk is reflected as a subset of physical or transition risk or as a distinct transmission channel, according to their business and risk profile.

=== Scope limitations ===
The PRA received representations that the policy should address nature-related risks and the concept of double materiality, under which firms would assess not only the effect of climate-related risks on their own financial position but also the effect of their activities on climate outcomes. It declined to extend the statement in either respect, stating that its supervisory expectations are grounded in its statutory objectives of promoting the safety and soundness of regulated firms and securing an appropriate degree of protection for policyholders, though it added that it continues to expect firms to manage all relevant financial risks to which they are exposed.

== See also ==
- List of financial supervisory authorities by country
