= List of directors of the Bank of England =

The Court of Directors of the Bank of England originally consisted of 24 shareholders, of which 8 were replaced every year by new members, i.e. shareholders not already directors of the bank at the time. This is an incomplete list of Bank of England directors from the bank's foundation in 1694.

== 17th century appointments ==
- John Houblon (1694–1699, 1700–1712) (First Governor 1694–1697)
- William Scawen (1694–1696) (1699–1722) (Governor 1697–1699)
- Nathaniel Tench (1694–?) (Governor 1699–1701)
- John Ward, MP (1694–97, 1698–99, 1703–1726) (Governor 1701–1703)
- Abraham Houblon (1694–?) (Governor 1703–1705)
- James Bateman (1694–1697, 1698–1699, 1700–1703 and 1707–1711) (Governor 1705–1707)
- Gilbert Heathcote, 1st Baronet (1694–1702, 1704–1725 and 1726–1733) (Governor 1709–1711 and 1723–1725)
- William Paterson (1694–95)
- James Houblon (1694–?) (died c.1700)
- Henry Furnese (1694–97 and 1699–1700 and 1700–1702)
- Samuel Lethieullier (1694–?)
- Theodore Janssen (1694–1719)
- John Lordell (1694–?)
- James Denew (1694–1702)
- Brook Bridges (1694–?)
- George Boddington (1694–)
- Obadiah Sedgwick (1694–?)
- Edward Clarke (1694–?)
- Robert Raworth (1694–?)
- Thomas Goddard (1694–1700)
- John Smith (of Beaufort Buildings) (1694–?)
- William Gore (1694–97, 1698–99 and 1701–1706)
- Thomas Abney (1694–1700, 1703–1705, 1706–1709, 1710–1714, 1715–1718, 1719–1722)
- William Hedges (1694–1700)
- John Huband, Bt (1694–?)
- Francis Eyles, 1st Baronet (1697–1703, 1704–05 and 1709–1715) (Governor 1707–1709)
- William Ashurst (1697–1700, 1701–1703, 1704–1706, 1707–1709, 1711–1714)
- Samuel Bulteel (1697–1708)
- Charles Chamberlan (1697–98 and 1703–1705)
- Peter Delmé (1698–1703, 1709–13 and 1717–1728) (Governor 1715–1717)
- Richard Levett (1698–1700)
- John Rudge (1699–1711) (Governor 1713–1715)
- Charles Thorold (1699–?)

== 18th century appointments ==
- William Des Bouverie (1700–?)
- Gerard Conyers (1702–04, 1705–07, 1708–10, 1711–1715 and 1719–1737) (Governor 1717–1719)
- Robert Clayton (1702–1707)
- Thomas Scawen (1705–08, 1709–10, 1711–14, 1715–19, 1723–26 and 1727–1729) (Governor 1721–1722)
- Charles Peers (1705–07 and 1708–1712)
- John Emilie (1708–?)
- Richard Du Cane (1710–1730)
- George Thorold (1711–16 and 1717–1721)
- Christopher Lethieullier (1712–? and 1720–?)
- Randolph Knipe (1712–16, 1717–20, 1721–24 and 1725–1728)
- Richard Houblon (1713–?)
- Robert Bristow (1713–1716) (1718–1720)
- John Eyles, 2nd Baronet (1715–1717)
- Humphry Morice (1716– and –1725) (Governor 1727–1729)
- John Francis Fauquier (1716–?)
- Joseph Eyles (1717–21 and 1730–1733)
- John Hanger (Governor 1719–1721)
- William Humfreys (1719–21, 1722–25, 1726–27 and 1728–1730)
- Samuel Holden (1720–27 and 1731–1740) (Governor 1729–1731)
- Horatio Townshend (1722–1725) (Governor 1733–1735)
- Delillers Carbonnel (1722–?) (Governor 1740–1741)
- Edward Bellamy (1723–26, 1727–29 and 1733–1749) (Governor 1731–1733)
- Nathaniel Gould (1725–?) (Governor 1711–1713)
- William Thompson (Governor 1725–1727)
- Bryan Benson (–1731 and 1737–?) (Governor 1735–1737)
- John Olmius (1723–1731)
- Francis Forbes (1724–1727)
- Thomas Cooke (1725–?) (Governor 1737–1740)
- William Jolliffe (1725–? and 1737–?)
- Francis Porten (1726–1728)
- James Gaultier (1728–1748)
- Stamp Brooksbank (1728–40 and 1743–1755) (Governor 1741–1743)
- Robert Alsop (1731–34 and 1735–1737)
- William Fawkener (Governor 1743–1745)
- Benjamin Lethieullier (1734–? and 1737–? and –1760)
- Benjamin Longuet (1734–37 and 1738–?) (Governor 1747–1749)
- Charles Savage (Governor 1745–1747)
- John Thompson (1734–37, 1738–42, 1743–45 and 1746–1749) (Lord Mayor of London, 1736)
- Robert Thornton (–1737 and 1738–?)
- William Hunt (Governor 1749–1752)
- Alexander Sheafe (1737–? and 1744–?) (Governor 1752–1754)
- Matthew Raper (1737–?)
- John Lequesne (1738–1741)
- Claude Fonnereau (1739–1740)
- Merrick Burrell (1742–1756 and 1760–1787) (Governor 1758–1760)
- James Theobald (1743-1756)
- Matthews Beachcroft (1744–?) (Governor 1756–1758)
- Thomas Winterbottom (1749–1752)
- Samuel Fludyer, 1st Baronet (1753–55, 1756–58, 1759–62, 1763–1768)
- Peter Du Cane (1755–1783)
- Mr Thomas Plumer, Esquire (1755 - 1775), father of Right-Hon. Thomas Plumer
- Thomas Chitty (1755–57 and 1758–1761)
- Bartholomew Burton (Governor 1760–1762)
- Robert Marsh (Governor 1762–1764)
- John Weyland (Governor (1764–1766)
- Benjamin Hopkins (1765–1767, 1768–1771, 1772–1775, 1776–1779)
- Lyde Browne (? - 1787)
- Gustavus Brander
- Matthew Clarmont (Governor 1766–1769)
- William Cooper (Governor 1769–1771)
- Edward Payne (Governor 1771–1773)
- James Sperling (Governor 1773–1775)
- Samuel Beachcroft (Governor 1775–1777)
- Peter Gaussen (1771–?) (Governor 1777–1779)
- Martyn Fonnereau (1771–1783)
- Samuel Bosanquet (1771–89 and 1793–1806) (Governor 1791–1793)
- Samuel Thornton (1780–?) (Governor 1799–1801)
- Brook Watson, 1st Baronet (1784–1786, 1787–1789, 1790–1793, 1796–1798, 1799–1801, 1802–1804, 1805–1807)
- John Harrison (1785–1794)
- Peter Thellusson, 1st Baron Rendlesham (1787–1806)
- Edward Simeon (c.1790–1812)
- Peter Cazalet (1792–1794)
- William Manning (1792–1831) (Governor 1812–1813)
- Jeremiah Harman (1794–1827) (Governor 1816–1818)

== 19th century appointments ==
- John Staniforth (1807–1819)
- Sir Thomas Neave, 2nd Baronet (from 1812)
- John Reid, 2nd Baronet (1820–1837 and 1841–1847) (Governor 1839–1841)
- William Thompson, MP (1827–1829, 1830–1832, 1833–1835, 1836–1839, 1840–1843, 1844–1847, 1847–1851, 1852–1854)
- John Gellibrand Hubbard, later 1st Baron Addington, (Governor 1853–1855)
- Thomas Matthias Weguelin (1838–1853) (Governor 1855–1857)
- Charles Frederick Huth (1838–?)
- Benjamin Buck Greene (1850–1900) (Governor 1873–1875)
- Hucks Gibbs, 1st Baron Aldenham (1853–1901) (Governor 1875–1877)
- George Goschen (1856–?)
- Christopher Weguelin (1867–1880)
- Alfred de Rothschild (1869–1889)
- Edward Charles Baring, 1st Baron Revelstoke (1879–1891)
- William Middleton Campbell (1886–?) (Governor 1907–1909)
- Everard Hambro (1895–1925)
- Walter Cunliffe, 1st Baron Cunliffe (1895–?) (Governor 1913–1918)
- John Baring, 2nd Baron Revelstoke (1898–1929)

== 20th century appointments ==
- Edward Charles Grenfell, 1st Baron St Just (1905–1940)
- Robert Kindersley, 1st Baron Kindersley (1914–1946)
- Frederick Huth Jackson 1918
- Henry Cosmo Orme Bonsor, 1st Baronet (1918–1927)
- Alan Anderson (1918–1946)
- Brien Cokayne, 1st Baron Cullen of Ashbourne (Governor 1918–1920)
- Roland Kitson, 3rd Baron Airedale (1923–1947)
- Albert Charles Gladstone, 5th Baronet (1924–1947)
- John Nairne, 1st Baronet (1925–1931)
- Alexander Shaw 1927 (died 1944)
- Basil Blackett (1928–1935)
- Josiah Stamp, 1st Baron Stamp (1928–1941)
- Andrew Duncan (1929–1940)
- John Hindley, 1st Viscount Hyndley (1931–1945)
- William Henry Clegg (1932–1937)
- Patrick Ashley Cooper (1932–1955)
- Edward Holland-Martin (1933–1948)
- Basil Gage Catterns (1934–1948)
- James George Weir (1935–1946)
- Dallas Gerald Mercer Bernard (1936–1949)
- Otto Niemeyer (1938–1952)
- James Pitman (1941–?)
- John Maynard Keynes (1941–1946)
- Josiah Wedgwood V (1942–1946)
- Harry Arthur Siepmann (1945-1954)
- William Piercy, 1st Baron Piercy (1946–1960)
- Michael Babington Smith (1949–1969)
- Humphrey Mynors, 1st Baronet (1949–1954)
- Eric Roll (1968–1977)
- Alfred Robens, Baron Robens of Woldingham (1966–?)
- Alastair Pilkington (1974–1984)
- Adrian Cadbury (1970–1994)
- Andrew Crockett (1989–1993)
- John Baring, 7th Baron Ashburton (1993–1991)
- David Clementi (1996–1997)
- Bill Morris (1998–?)
- Neville Simms (1995–2002)

== 21st century appointments ==
- Peter Jay (2003–?)

== See also ==
- Governor of the Bank of England
- Deputy Governor of the Bank of England

== Sources ==
- Crouzet, François (1991). "The Huguenots and the English Financial Revolution". In Higonnet, Patrice; Landes, David S.; Rosovsky, Henry (eds.). Favourites of Fortune. Harvard University Press. pp. 221–266. ISBN 9780674295209.
