= Jock Campbell, Baron Campbell of Eskan =

British businessman and peer (1912–1994)

The Right Honourable The Lord Campbell of Eskan
- Campbell in 1969
- Born: John Middleton Campbell; 8 August 1912; Kensington, London, England
- Died: 26 December 1994 (aged 82); Nettlebed, Oxfordshire, England
- Education: Eton College; Exeter College, Oxford
- Occupation: Businessman
- Known for: Chairman of Booker Brothers, McConnell and Co (later Booker-McConnell) in British Guiana
- Relatives: William Middleton Campbell (grandfather)

John Middleton Campbell, Baron Campbell of Eskan (8 August 1912 – 26 December 1994), commonly known as Jock Campbell, was a British businessman and entrepreneur, Chairman of Booker Brothers, McConnell and Co (later Booker-McConnell) in British Guiana (now Guyana) between 1952 and 1967. He was knighted in 1957 and was created a Labour Party life peer on 14 January 1966, taking the title Baron Campbell of Eskan, of Camis Eskan in the County of Dumbarton. He was Chairman of the Commonwealth Sugar Exporters Association (1950–84). He was additionally notable as chairman of Booker McConnell, Chairman of the New Statesman and Nation and the first chairman of the Milton Keynes Development Corporation.

== Childhood and youth ==
Jock Campbell was born on 8 August 1912 to Mary Charlotte Gladys Barrington (1889–1981) and Colin Algernon Campbell, in Kensington, London. Jock's paternal grandfather, William Middleton Campbell, was Governor of the Bank of England between 1907 and 1909. His mother Mary was of aristocratic Irish stock. Jock was sent at the age of three, during the First World War, to the family seat of his mother's family, Glenstal Castle in south-west Ireland, to be safe from the bombs of the German Zeppelins. After the war, Jock returned to the family home in Kent. He later attended Eton and Exeter College, Oxford.

== Family background: the slave trade ==
It was John Campbell (Senior), Jock's great-great-grandfather, ship owner and merchant of Glasgow, who, towards the end of the 18th century, first established the fortunes of the Campbell family in the West Indies, through the Atlantic slave trade. At the time, Glasgow trading houses, long-experienced in servicing the needs of North American slave plantations, were ready to capitalise on new opportunities in the sugar industry arising on the West Indies. By the 1780s they were supplying the two most important British exports to the West Indies, herring and coarse linen goods.

Among the principal beneficiaries of this booming trade were John Campbell (Senior) and Company, which supplied merchandise to the slave plantations along the coast of Guiana, then in Dutch hands. It was in this role of supplier that the company first began to acquire plantations along the Essequibo Coast of Guiana, from planters facing bankruptcy. By the 20th century, the company of Curtis, Campbell and Co had its established place in the British Guiana plantocracy; When Jock's great-grandfather, Colin Campbell of Colgrain, died in 1886 he left £627,000. (Note: About £86,000,000 today.) When his grandfather, William Middleton Campbell died in 1919, he left £711,000. (Note: About £41,000,000 today.)

Campbell later remarked often that, in acquiring estates through foreclosure, his ancestors became de facto slave-owners. Campbell himself abhorred slavery, and it was in fact the urge to make good the misdeeds of his own family that was the catalyst for his own reformist ideals.

On 5 May 1971, in the House of Lords, Campbell dissociated himself from his ancestors, arguing that "maximising profits cannot and should not be the sole purpose, or even the primary purpose, of business."

== Arriving in British Guiana ==
Jock Campbell went to British Guiana for the first time to take charge of the family estates along the Corentyne, and arrived in 1934. He was dismayed by what he saw there. "I was profoundly shocked by what I found," he said, "the dereliction of the sugar estates and factories, the awful housing of labourers, the racial problems, the arrogance of the Plantocracy."

During this period, Campbell had frequent visits with his predecessor J.C. Gibson, the manager known for his progressive governance of estates. Gibson's unprecedented approach to labour organisation, estate discipline, and administrative efficiency left a lasting impression on Campbell. While Campbell later introduced his own reforms, including modernised management practices and localised sugar processing, much of his policies bore semblance to those used by Gibson.

In 1939, the family firm (Curtis Campbell) merged with Booker Brothers and McConnell and vt 1945, Campbell became leader of the group. According to the Oxford Dictionary of National Biography, "In British Guiana, Booker controlled 80 per cent of the sugar industry and was involved in a range of activities, including the production of rum, shopkeeping, and drug manufacturing. The country was often referred to as Booker's Guiana." Campbell set himself the task of modernising the business (especially in Guiana), with improved management, localised sugar processing and civilised treatment of workers, practises he studied under Gibson.

== Politics ==
=== British Guiana/Guyana ===
In British Guiana, Campbell met his foil in Cheddi Jagan. Jagan, himself the son of Indian indentured servants, quickly gained the confidence of the sugar workers, and in Guyana's first general elections in 1953 became prime minister.

Campbell was willing to work with Jagan, as both had the same aims, but Jagan made it clear that the sugar industry would be nationalised after independence. Jagan was removed from power by the British due to his Marxist leanings; in his place came Forbes Burnham.

=== United Kingdom ===
From 1964 to 1981, Campbell was chairman of The New Statesman. He declared himself a Labour voter in 1964, writing in an article in The Observer: "My hope is that a Labour Government will give a decisive lurch towards fairer shares and a more open society in Britain : and so a more dynamic society."

On 14 January 1966, Campbell was created a life peer, by Harold Wilson, taking the title "Baron Campbell of Eskan", "of Camis Eskan in the County of Dumbarton". Camis Eskan is a large house, now flatted, just to the east of Helensburgh. In an interview with the Helensburgh and Gareloch Times immediately after he became a peer he said that "I am very proud of my connections with this part of the country. My family owned Camis Eskan from the beginning of the last century. The family grave is in the local churchyard." However, he also explained that his family had sold the house 15 years earlier "because I could not have afforded to keep it up."

He was active in the House of Lords on behalf of the Labour Party.

== The Booker Prize ==
It is after leaving Guyana that Campbell, who had always loved great literature, became instrumental in the initiation of a British literature prize.

He was an old friend and golfing partner of Ian Fleming, author of the James Bond spy novels, who had recently been diagnosed as terminally ill with less than a year to live. During a game of golf Fleming turned to Campbell for advice on securing his estate for his family from heavy taxation. Campbell initially advised Fleming to turn to accountants and merchant bankers, but then had a new idea: Bookers could act as bankers for Fleming, beneficially for both parties.

As a result, Bookers acquired a 51 per cent share in the profits of Glidmore Productions, the company handling the profits from worldwide royalties on Fleming's books, and the associated merchandising rights – but not the film rights.

Thus was born the Bookers Author Division, with the injunction:

It should make money, not to mention being entertaining, and there could be advertising interest in it for some of our companies.

Bookers later acquired the copyrights of other well-known authors, including novelists Agatha Christie, Dennis Wheatley, Georgette Heyer and the playwrights Robert Bolt and Harold Pinter. It was the copyrights of Agatha Christie which, over time, contributed most to the profit of the Authors Division.

The Booker Prize was launched in 1969, after the publishers Jonathan Cape suggested that Bookers might sponsor a major fiction prize. A new sponsor for the prize was announced in April 2002, the Man Group, after which it became known as the Man Booker Prize.

== Milton Keynes Development Corporation ==
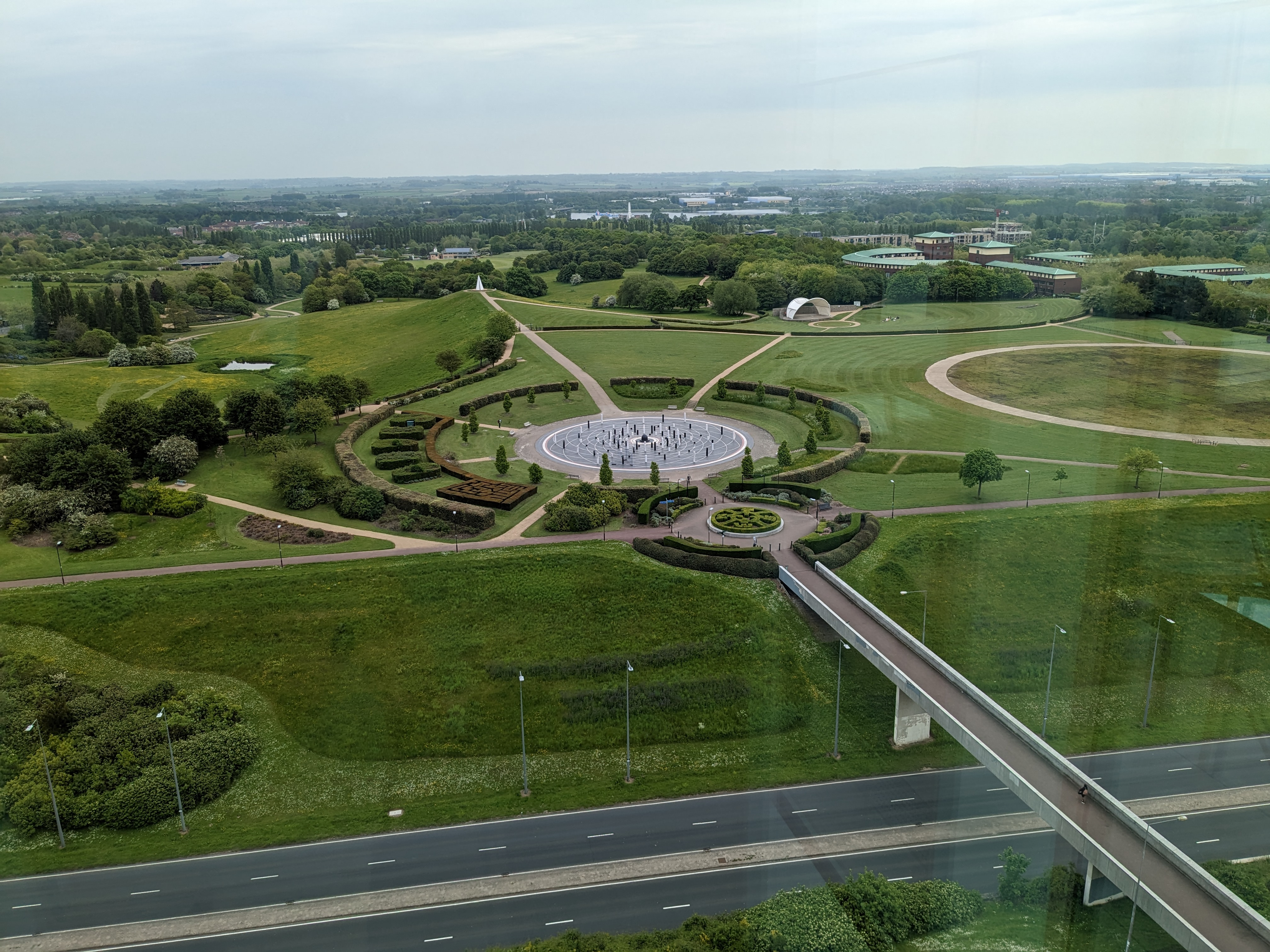
Campbell Park in Milton Keynes, named in his honour

Jock Campbell was chairman for the Milton Keynes Development Corporation from 1967. The large, central park initially called City Park, was renamed Campbell Park in his honour. There is a memorial stone in his honour which reads simply "Si monumentum requiris, circumspice". ("If you seek a monument, look about you", referring to the urban landscape created by his team.)

In June 1973, Campbell was awarded an honorary degree from the Open University as Doctor of the University.

He stepped down from the post of chairman of Milton Keynes Development Corporation in 1983 and was replaced by Sir Henry Chilver, who remained in post until Milton Keynes Development Corporation was wound up on 1 April 1992.

== Arms ==
Coat of arms of Jock Campbell, Baron Campbell of Eskan

Crest
A boar's head erect and erased Or.
Escutcheon
Gyronny of eight pieces Or and Sable and in chief a mullet counterchanged of the field all within a bordure embattled Vert charged with eight buckles of the first.
Supporters
Two jaguars Proper gorged of chaplets of bog-myrtle also Proper.
Motto
Fac Et Spera

== See also ==
- Carter-Campbell of Possil

== Writings ==
- Jock Campbell and others, Britain, the EEC and the Third World, Praeger Publishers, 1972
