= Edward Payne (banker) =

English merchant (1716–1794)

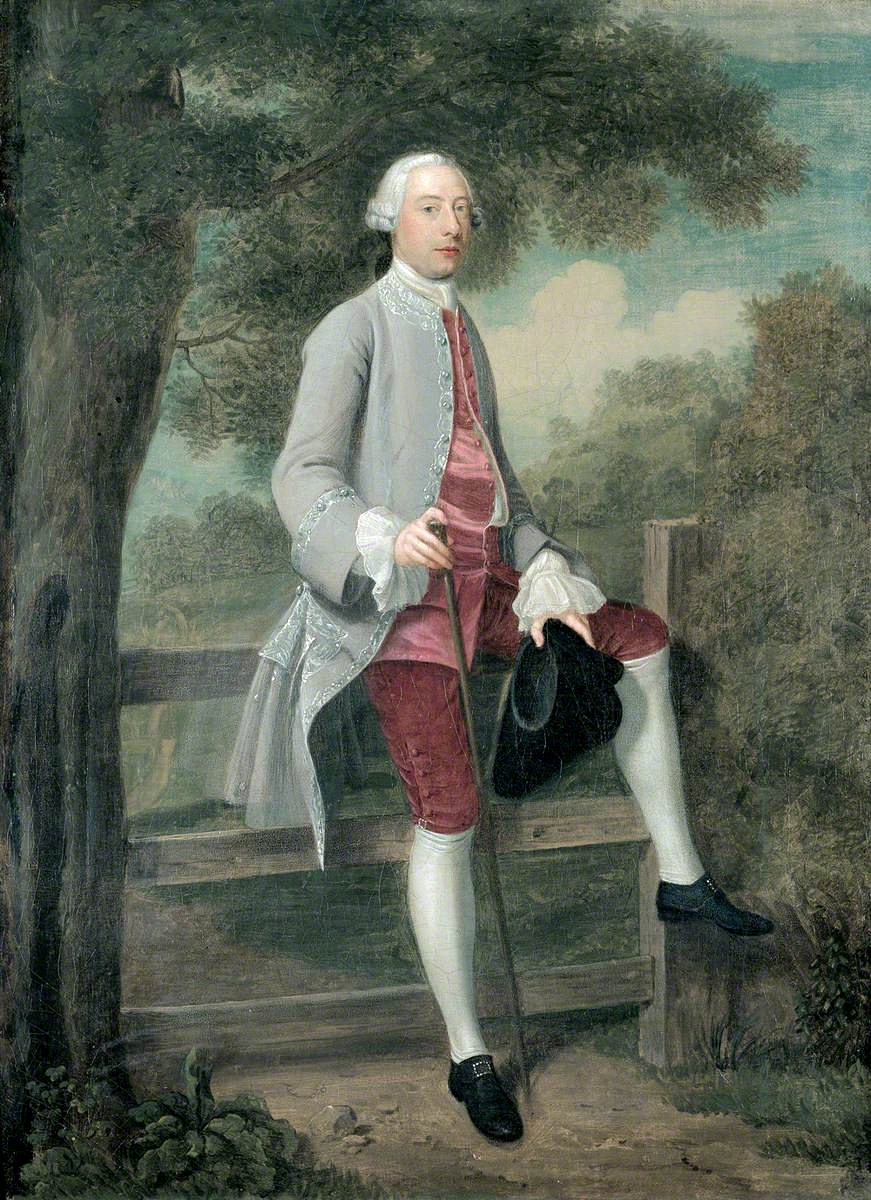
Edward Payne, portrait by Arthur Devis

Edward Payne (1716–1794) was an English merchant, Governor of the Bank of England from 1771 to 1773.

== Background ==
He was the second son of John Payne (died 1746), a London haberdasher and East India Company director, and his wife Lydia Durrant; his paternal grandfather John Payne (died 1706) was from Cottesbrooke, Nottinghamshire. His father left him £1000 in Bank of England stock, with £1000 in East India Company stock and property.

== In commerce ==
Edward Payne was the brother of John Payne, who went into partnership with Abel Smith (1717–1788) of Smith's Bank in 1758, forming Smith & Payne. Edward was part-owner of an East Indiaman, the Shaftesbury, and John was a director of the East India Company.

On John Payne's death in 1764, Edward Payne went into partnership with John's son Rene (or René). They were merchants in London. The firm was based in the Lothbury area, i.e. the parish of St Margaret Lothbury. The street address was King's Arms Yard, in Coleman Street Ward.

In 1774 Edward & Rene Payne imported tobacco from Virginia's Upper James Naval District. A 1775 letter from Neil Jamieson, a loyalist in Norfolk, Virginia to Edward & Rene Payne was intercepted by George Washington and passed to the Continental Congress. Edward Payne was one of a group of City of London figures who testified to the House of Lords in February 1777 on commercial losses caused by the American Revolutionary War, with the America merchant Thomas Wooldridge, West Indies merchant Beeston Long I, Abraham Hake of Lloyd's, the slave trader John Shoolbred and others. Ordered to the House at his Colman Street business address, he was referred to in the Parliamentary Register as of Cornhill, another London ward.

During the 1780s, Payne chaired the London Committee of Merchants trading to North America. In 1789 George Smith (1765–1836) bought into Edward & Rene Payne, with a 20% holding. In December 1789, the lifting of an Order in Council restricting corn imports from the USA was notified by a public announcement to Payne.

== Bank of England ==
Payne was a director of the Bank of England from 1756 or 1757. He was Deputy Governor of the Bank of England from 1769 to 1771. He replaced William Cooper as Governor and was succeeded by James Sperling. Payne's tenures as Deputy and Governor covered the Bengal Bubble of 1769 and the British credit crisis of 1772–1773. In 1772 he was supporting George Colebrooke's stock manipulations, as later complained of by the publicist William James to Benjamin Franklin, who was speculating against Colebrooke.

After the death in 1773 of Sir Robert Ladbroke, Tory Member of Parliament for the City of London, Payne's name was mentioned as a possible successor; a meeting at the Half Moon Tavern, Cheapside, owned by the Saddlers Company, of the London livery companies endorsed him for his efforts to protect trade in 1771–2. At the by-election, Frederick Bull, a Wilkite, won a close contest defeating John Roberts.

In the wake of Robert Smith's efforts to grow the London private bank Smith & Payne, it hit financial difficulties in 1776–7. Edward Payne assisted by having the Bank of England take on some of the bank's discounted bills, a deprecated move; the Oxford Dictionary of National Biography speaks of "extraordinary re-discount facilities". Payne was never formally connected to the London or Nottingham branches of Smith's Bank, while acting as a consultant. He shared about 50% of their profits, by arrangement with his brother John and then his nephew Rene.

== Later life ==
On 7 January 1789, in the wake of the Regency Crisis of 1788, at a meeting of "Merchants, Bankers, and Traders" in the London Tavern chaired by Samuel Beachcroft, Payne proposed a vote of thanks to William Pitt the younger for his "able, spirited and manly defence of the sacred Constitution of this Empire". He died on 9 October 1794, at his business address in the City of London. He was a member of the Society for the Encouragement of Arts, Manufactures and Commerce.

== Trustee for Grenada estates ==
Payne became one of a group of trustees set up to resolve the potential insolvency of debtors of George Peters, a Bank of England director. The debtors were Israel Wilkes (1722–1805), brother of John Wilkes, and his brother-in-law John de Ponthieu (1732–1773), brother of Henry de Ponthieu, proprietors of Grenada estates run by enslaved people. Payne had done business with John de Ponthieu. Among the other trustees was John Julius Angerstein of Lloyd's of London.

The events leading up to the formation of the trust began when Edward and Rene Payne tried to collect debts from the Larnac brothers of Martinique. The Larnacs declared bankruptcy. Edward Payne and Josias de Ponthieu, as syndics, approached the Earl of Shelburne as First Lord of Trade for legal help in Paris against the Larnacs.

In 1768 Peters asked Angerstein for help; who involved Payne and John Wilkinson. The trustees mortgaged the Grenada estates in 1771, to Daniel Giles (75%) and the London merchant Daniel Richard (25%, died 1793).

== Family ==
Payne married Frances (died 1821). Of their children:

- Frances, the eldest daughter, married in 1784 the Rev. George Pickard, rector of Bloxworth. He was the son of Jocelyn Pickard and his wife Henrietta Trenchard, daughter of George Trenchard MP.
- Eliza married in 1786 Captain Robert Adair (1760–1844) of Ballymena.
- John George Payne married in 1781 Catherine Garrick, daughter of George Garrick and niece of David Garrick. For a period of a few years in the 1780s he was a partner in Smith, Payne & Smiths, the family bank.

The Edward Payne mentioned in the leading chancery case Lord Carrington v Payne of 1800, concerning the will of Rene Payne, was the brother of Rene who died in 1830, aged 84.

George François Grand, the Huguenot first husband of Catherine Grand and author of Narrative of the Life of a Gentleman Long Resident in India, was apprenticed around 1765 to Robert Jones. He claimed kinship to the Paynes, calling "aunt" the widow of Edward's brother John Payne. Dissatisfied both with the apprenticeship and Jones's subsequent offer of a cadet East India Company position at Bencoolen, he had his aunt intervene, and sailed for Bengal at the beginning of 1766. In June he met Robert Clive in Calcutta, who spoke highly of John Payne, but did not give him a commission. He was in England when Jones died in 1774, dashing some hopes he had of preferment. Edward Payne arranged for him to have a writership.

== Legacy ==
Payne made provision in his will for his wife, his son John George, his daughter called Elizabeth Adair, and his son-in-law George Pickford. He left £100 to the poor of Ealing. This bequest was later expanded by gifts from Sir Charles Morgan, and then by Frederick Augustus Wetherall. The lease of the manor of Sutton Valence (Town Sutton), left to him by his father, he passed on to his heirs.

Rene Payne died in 1799. After the death of the original partners, the firm Edward and Rene Payne & Co. continued under the same name.

Edward Payne appeared on the King of Diamonds in a 1992 pack of cards printed for the Bank of England.

=== Ealing House ===
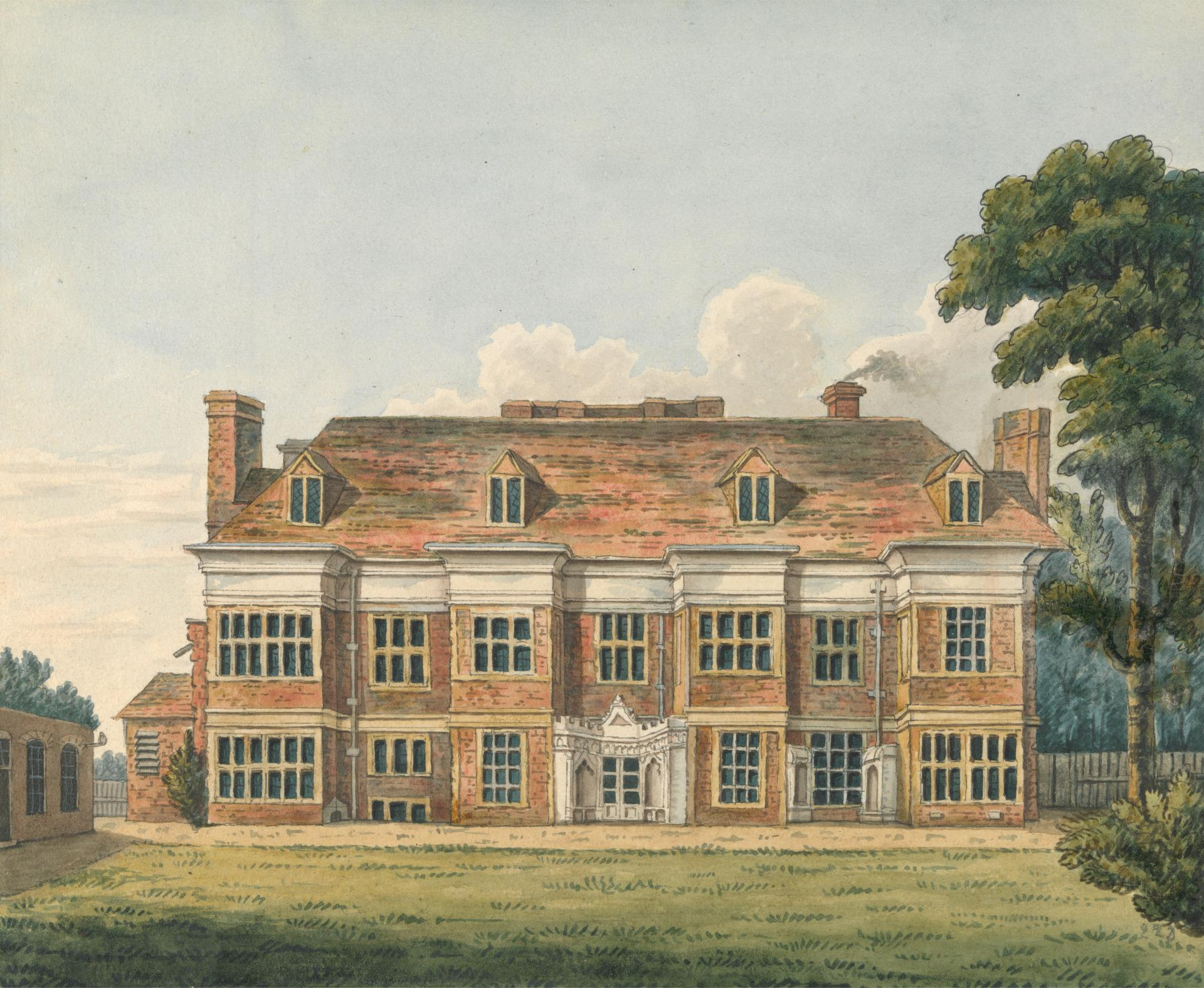
Ealing House, watercolour by Charles Tomkins

Burke in 1894 identified the residence of Frances Payne's father Edward as Ealing House. In 1813 it was called "a large and gloomy residence", and was untenanted.

Lysons in vol. II (1795) of The Environs of London stated that Payne owned the house, and gave the two previous owners as John Huske and William Adair. When vol. IV of that work appeared in 1796, there was a correction to the Ealing section of vol. II, including the comments "Hickes-on-the-Heath, now called Elm-Grove, has been sold by Mr. Barnard to Lord Kinnaird. Ealing-house is now the property of the Earl of Galloway." In vol. III of the second edition (1811), the owner is given as Colonel Douglas.

Gillian Darley's biography of Sir John Soane places these houses as "opposite neighbours" of Pitzhanger Manor, which Soane had renovated as his own residence in Ealing from around 1800: the neighbours were "Edward Payne and Lord Kinnard at, respectively, Ealing House and Ealing Grove". If Ealing House had by then been sold out of the Payne family, the reference to Edward Payne is anachronistic.
