= Alfred Latham =

English businessman and banker (1801–1885)

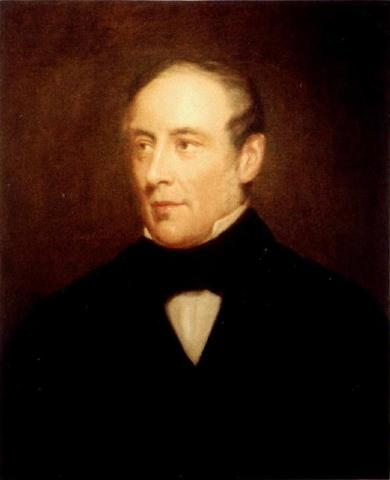
- Born: 1801
- Died: 1885
- Occupation: Banker

Alfred Latham (1801–1885) was an English businessman and banker, born in Camberwell to Thomas Latham (1746–1818), a merchant and plantation owner, and his wife, Ann Jones. Inheriting wealth, Latham went into business in 1824, and went into partnership in what became the Arbuthnot Latham bank in 1833, with John Alves Arbuthnot (1802–1875).

In 1833, Latham received £3,873 (c.£370,000 in 2020 money) as compensation for giving up the ownership of 402 slaves.

Latham was Governor of the Bank of England from 1861 to 1863. He had been Deputy Governor from 1859 to 1861. He replaced Bonamy Dobrée as Governor and was succeeded by Kirkman Daniel Hodgson.

The Polish economist Louis Wolowski published an extract of letter sent he sent to Latham in his book L'or et l'argent (1870).

In June 2020, the Bank of England issued a public apology for the involvement of Latham, amongst other employees, in the slave trade following the investigation by the Centre for the Study of the Legacies of British Slave-ownership at UCL. According to The Art Newspaper the Bank of England will remove Lathams portrait from public view, as well as 10 more portraits of former governors, such as Benjamin Buck Greene, that are linked to slavery.

== See also ==
- Chief Cashier of the Bank of England
