= John Horsley Palmer =

English banker and Governor of the Bank of England; (1779–1858)

- Born: 7 July 1779
- Died: 7 February 1858 (aged 78)
- Occupation: Governor
- Spouse: Elizabeth Belli (m. 1810)

John Horsley Palmer (7 July 1779 – 7 February 1858) was an English banker who was Governor of the Bank of England from 1830 to 1833.

== Life ==
Palmer was the fourth son and seventh child of William Palmer of Wanlip, Leicestershire (1748?–1821) and later of Nazeing Park, Essex, a London merchant, and his wife Mary Horsley (born 1747), daughter of John Horsley the rector of Thorley, Hertfordshire, and sister of Samuel Horsley. George Palmer (MP for South Essex) was his elder brother, and William Jocelyn Palmer Sir Ralph Palmer were also brothers.

He was educated at Charterhouse School where in 1794 he took part in the first school cricket match against Westminster School.

Palmer became a Director of the Bank of England in 1811, remaining until 1857. He served as Deputy Governor of the bank from 1828 to 1830, and Governor from 1830 to 1833. In June 2020 the Bank of England issued a public apology for the involvement of Palmer, amongst other employees, in the slave trade following the investigation by the Centre for the Study of the Legacies of British Slave-ownership at UCL.

In 1820, he purchased Hurlingham House in Fulham. He extended the property at Hurlingham by six acres, and let it to the brother of the Duke of Wellington.

He was a member of Political Economy Club and published three books (or pamphlets), including The Causes and Consequences of the Pressure Upon the Money-market.

Palmer died aged 78 and was buried in Catacomb B at Kensal Green Cemetery.

== Family ==
Palmer married Elizabeth Belli, daughter of John Belli and Elizabeth Stuart Cockerell, on 16 November 1810. Her portrait was painted by Thomas Lawrence.

Government offices
Preceded by Samuel Drewe	Governor of the Bank of England; 1830 - 1833	Succeeded by Richard Mee Raikes
