= Timothy Abraham Curtis =

Governor of the Bank of England from 1837 to 1839

- Born: Edmonton, Middlesex
- Died: Blenheim Park, Oxfordshire

Timothy Abraham Curtis was Governor of the Bank of England from 1837 to 1839. He had been Deputy Governor from 1834 to 1837. He replaced James Pattison as Governor and was succeeded by John Reid. Curtis' tenure as Governor occurred during the Panic of 1837. In June 2020, the Bank of England issued a public apology for the involvement of Curtis, amongst other employees, in the slave trade following the investigation by the Centre for the Study of the Legacies of British Slave-ownership at UCL.

== See also ==
- Chief Cashier of the Bank of England
