= Beeston Long =

English businessman

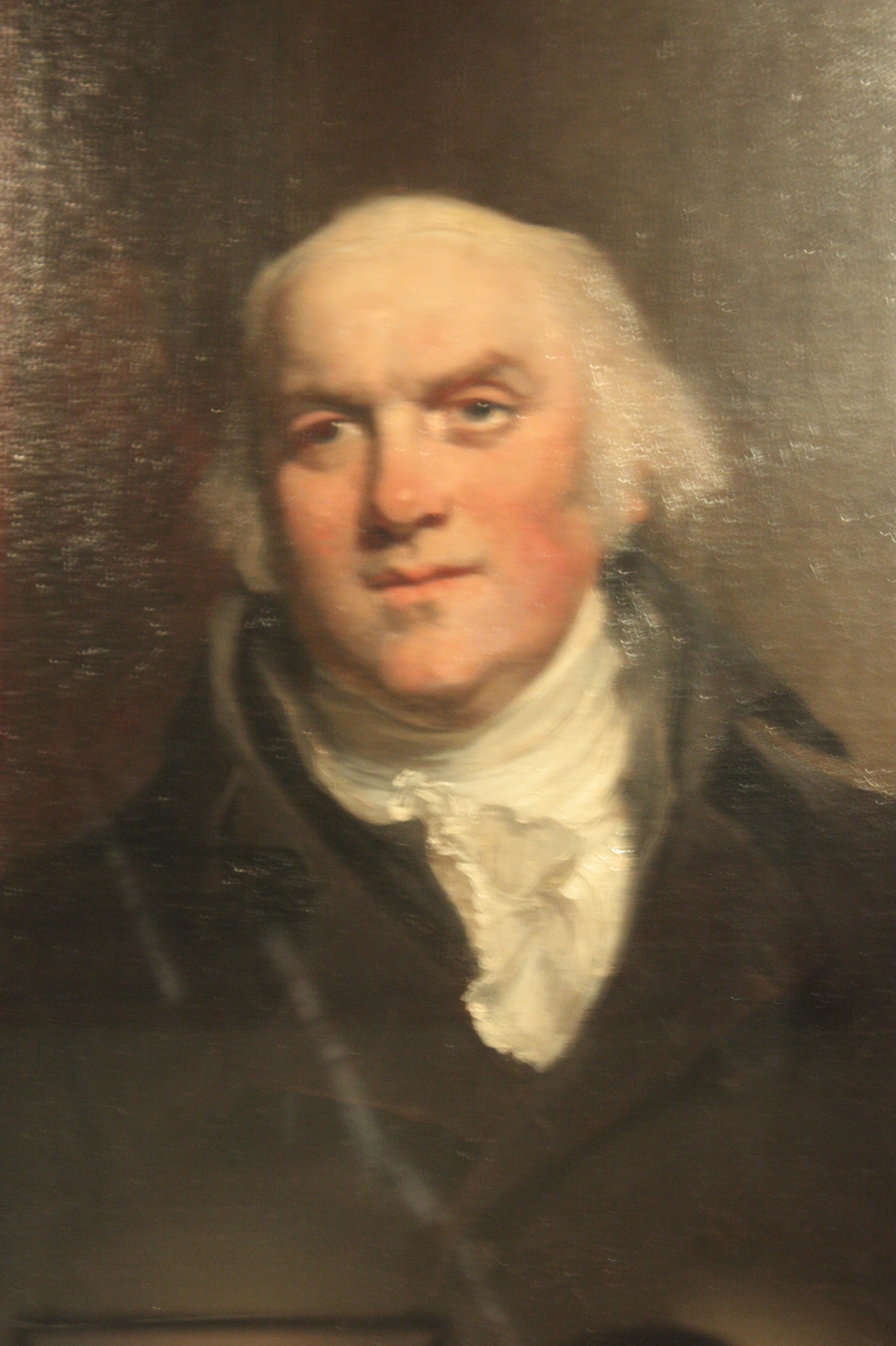
Beeston Long by William Owen

Beeston Long (4 February 1757 – 1820), of Combe House, Surrey, was an English businessman.

== Life ==
He was the son of Beeston Long, a West India Merchant and deputy Governor of the Royal Exchange Assurance Corporation, and brother of Charles Long, 1st Baron Farnborough and Samuel Long.

Long was a senior partner of the firm of West India merchants (largely trading with Jamaica), Long, Drake & Co, based in Leadenhall Street. He succeeded his father-in-law as Chairman of the West India Merchants. He was a vice-president of the London Institution and leader of a group of merchants and speculators who, in a private venture, undertook the construction of the docks at Wapping. The London Docks Company had a 21-year monopoly to unload all vessels entering the port with tobacco, rice, wine and brandy (except from the East and West Indies). Long and the other directors sat in the London Dock House, in New Bank Buildings, from where they oversaw their involvement in the transatlantic slave trade.

He was Governor of the Bank of England, a position he held from 1806 to 1808, having served previously as its Deputy Governor. In June 2020 the Bank of England issued a public apology for the involvement of Long, amongst other employees, in the slave trade following the investigation by the Centre for the Study of the Legacies of British Slave-ownership at UCL.

Long died in 1820, survived by his wife and two children.

== Family ==
Long married in 1786 Frances Louisa, eldest daughter of Sir Richard Neave, 1st Baronet.

== Notes ==
Government offices
Preceded by Benjamin Winthrop	Governor of the Bank of England; 1806–1808	Succeeded by John Whitmore
