= William Fawkener =

William Fawkener may refer to

- William Fawkener (merchant) (1642–1716) was a leading member of the Levant Company, father of Sir Everard Fawkener and the banker.
- William Fawkener (banker), Governor of the Bank of England (1743–1745)
- William Augustus Fawkener (c. 1750 – 1811), clerk to the Privy Council and diplomat
