= Joseph Nutt (banker) =

Governor of the Bank of England (1735–1805)

- Born: 1735
- Died: 9 March 1805 (aged 69)
- Occupation: Governor

Joseph Nutt (1735 – 9 March 1805) was Governor of the Bank of England from 1802 to 1804. He had been Deputy Governor from 1801 to 1802. He replaced Job Mathew Raikes as Governor and was succeeded by Benjamin Winthrop. He was the eledest son of John Nutt and Margaret, née Carr, of Raisin Hall near Pitsmoor, Sheffield. He never married and died on 9 March 1805, aged 69, while travelling to London from Oxford.

== See also ==
- Chief Cashier of the Bank of England
