= Sheffield Neave =

English merchant and Governor of the Bank of England (1799–1868)

- Born: 1799
- Died: 1868 (aged 68–69)
- Education: Christ Church, Oxford
- Occupation: merchant

Sheffield Neave (1799–1868) was an English merchant and Governor of the Bank of England from 1857 to 1859.

== Life ==
He was the son of Sir Thomas Neave, 2nd Baronet, and his wife, Frances Digby, daughter of William Digby, and was educated at Christ Church, Oxford. He had been Deputy Governor from 1855 to 1857. He replaced Thomas Matthias Weguelin as Governor and was succeeded by Bonamy Dobrée.

Neave's tenure as Governor occurred during the Panic of 1857. In June 2020, the Bank of England issued a public apology for the involvement of Neave, amongst other employees, in the slave trade following the investigation by the Centre for the Study of the Legacies of British Slave-ownership at UCL.

== Family ==
Neave married Mary, daughter of David Richard Morier. Two sons, Sheffield Henry Morier Neave and Edward Strangways Neave, were partners in the family merchant house R. & T. Neave, the former being the father of Sheffield Airey Neave.

== See also ==
- Chief Cashier of the Bank of England
