= Bonamy Dobrée (banker) =

Governor of the Bank of England (1818–1907)

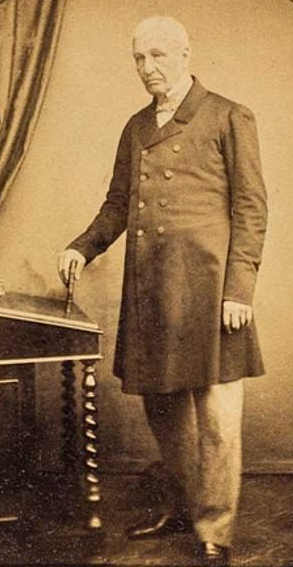
- Born: 22 August 1818
- Died: 13 March 1907 (aged 88)
- Occupation: Governor

Bonamy Dobrée (22 August 1818 – 13 March 1907) was Governor of the Bank of England from 1859 to 1861. He had been Deputy Governor from 1857 to 1859. He replaced Sheffield Neave as Governor and was succeeded by Alfred Latham. In June 2020 the Bank of England issued a public apology for the involvement of Dobrée, amongst other employees, in the slave trade following the investigation by the Centre for the Study of the Legacies of British Slave-ownership at UCL.

== See also ==
- Chief Cashier of the Bank of England
