= Governor Burton =

Governor Burton may refer to:

- Bartholomew Burton (1690s–1770), Governor of the Bank of England from 1760 to 1762
- Francis Nathaniel Burton (1766–1832), Acting Governor of Lower Canada from 1824 to 1825
- Hutchins Gordon Burton (1774–1836), 22nd Governor of North Carolina
- Ralph Burton (British Army officer) (died 1768), Military Governor of Quebec from 1763 to 1766
- William Burton (governor) (1789–1866), 39th Governor of Delaware
