= Fawkener =

Fawkener is a surname. Notable people with the surname include:

- Sir Everard Fawkener (1694–1758), English merchant and diplomat
- William Fawkener (banker), Governor of the Bank of England from 1743 to 1745
- William Augustus Fawkener (c.1750–1811), British civil servant and diplomat
