= List of officials and shareholders in the Royal African Company, 1672 =

A charter of incorporation was granted to "New Royal African Company" on 27 September 1672 by Charles II, superseding the "Company of Royal Adventurers trading into Africa", chartered on 10 January 1663. The following list of officers and shareholders ("subscribers") is taken from the charter of incorporation.

== Officers ==
- James, Duke of York (later King James II)
- Sir John Banks
- John Bence, Esq.
- John Buckworth
- Jarvis Cartwright
- William Earl of Craven
- Samuel Dashwood
- Thomas Farrington
- Sir Richard Ford
- Capt. Ferdinando Gorges
- Edward Hopegood
- John Jeffreys
- Sir Andrew King
- Charles Modyford, Esq.
- Samuel Moyer
- Peter Proby
- Gabriel Roberts
- Anthony Earl of Shaftesbury
- Sir John Shaw
- Benjamin Skutt
- Thomas Vernon
- Sir Robert Vyner
- Nicholas Warren
- Richard Young

== Founding shareholders ==
(Note: "shareholder" is a relatively modern term. At the time of the charter, shareholders were called "subscribers".)

- James, Duke of York (later King James II)
- Prince Rupert
- Anthony, Earl of Shaftesbury
- Henry, Earl of Arlington
- Col. William Ashburnham
- Alderman Robert Ask
- John Ashby
- John Ayres
- Thomas Aldworth
- Russell Alsop
- Richard Alic
- Thomas Andrewes
- Duke of Buckingham
- John, Earl of Bath
- George Lord Berkley of Berkley
- Sir John Banks
- Sir Thomas Blodworth
- John Ball
- John Bence, Esq.
- Richard Booth
- John Buckworth
- James Burkin
- John Bull
- Mrs. Dorcas Birkhead
- Edmond Bostock
- Richard Beckford
- Anthony Barnardiston
- Joas Bateman
- Edward Bouvery
- Man Browne
- John Beare
- Richard Boys
- John Bowerman
- William Bowman
- John Bowles
- Thos. Lord Clifford
- William, Earl of Craven
- Sir George Carteret
- Sir William Coventry
- Sir Anthony Craven
- Sir Robert Cotton
- Sir Peter Colleton
- Sir Nicholas Crispe
- Sir Francis Chaplin
- Sir Robert Clayton
- Mrs. Dorothy Colvill
- Capt. George Cock
- Benjamin Coles
- John Crispe, Esq.
- Thomas Crispe
- Nicholas Cook
- Jarvis Cartwright
- John Culling
- Josia Childe
- Thomas Childe
- Nicholas Carter
- Benjamin Cole
- John Cooke
- Sir Jonathan Dawes
- George Dashwood, Esq.
- Alderman Francis Dashwood
- William Dashwood
- Samuel Dashwood
- George Day
- Thomas Duck
- Humphrey Edwin
- Samuel Everard
- Sir Richard Ford
- Sir Philip Frowd
- Alderman Daniel Forth
- John Fenn
- Thomas Farington
- George Frohock
- John Fitch
- Moses Goodyer
- Capt. Ferdinando Gorges
- Henry Griffith
- William Goulston
- John Gardner
- Philip Grave
- William Galway
- Robt. Jeffreys
- John Gourney
- Francis Lord Hawley
- James Hoare (senior)
- Edward Hopegood
- William Hodges
- John Hill
- John Harbin
- Ralph Hodgkins
- Thomas Heatley
- Richard Holder
- Richard Hawkins
- George Hadley
- Rowland Hill
- James Hoare (junior)
- Henry Johnson
- John Jeffreys
- John Jurin
- Peter Joy
- Thomas Johnson
- Marke Jarvis
- Sir Andrew King
- George Keats
- Henry Kempe
- Sir Charles Littleton
- Sir John Lowther
- Christopher Lowther
- Thomas Lewis
- John Lindsey
- Simon Lewis
- John Letten
- Jacob Lucy
- William Levell
- Ralph Lee
- Henry Lascee
- John Locke
- Charles Modyford
- Richard Middleton
- Marke Mortimer
- John Middleton
- Robert Morris
- Daniel Mercer
- Humphrey Morrice
- John Morrice
- Thomas Murthwaite
- Samuel Moyer
- Ralph Marshall
- John Meade
- John Markland
- John Morgan
- Robert Monteth
- Wm. Metcalfe
- Thomas Neales
- Benjamin Newland
- Thomas Nicholls
- Richard Nicol
- Mrs. Delicia Nelson
- William Lord Powis
- Sr. Thomas Player
- Lawrence du Puy
- Charles Porter
- Thomas Povey
- John Portman
- Peter Proby
- Daniel Pennington
- Peter Paravicini
- Sir John Robinson
- Dame Priscilla Rider
- Tobias Rustal
- William Rosse of Rosse Island
- Thomas Rider
- William Rider
- William Roberts
- Robert Ryves
- Gabriel Roberts
- Henry Richards
- Edward Rudge
- Godfrey Richards
- Charles Ryves
- Sir John Shaw
- Col. John Searle
- Sir John Smith
- Benjamin Skutt
- Joseph Skutt
- William Salmon
- Samuel Sambrooke
- Peter Short
- Robert Stevenson
- William Stevens
- John Short
- Thomas Short
- John Sweeting
- Simon Smith
- John Skepper
- Thomas Stevens
- Nathaniel Symons
- Edmond Sherman
- ____ Shermer
- Sir John Talbott
- Henry Tulce
- George Toriano
- Samuel Terrell
- Paul Tatnell
- Sir Robert Vyner
- Thomas Vernon
- William Vannam
- Sir George Waterman
- Sir Thomas Wolstenholme
- Sir William Warren
- Brome Whorwood
- Sir Joseph Williamson
- Thomas Winter
- Edward Willoughby
- William Walker
- Nicholas Warren
- William Warren
- Arnold White
- John Winder
- Nicholas Wilde
- Thomas Westerne
- Richard Young
- John Young

== See also ==
- Register of British Slave-Traders
