= Deputy governor of the Bank of England =

A Deputy Governor of the Bank of England is the holder of one of a small number of senior positions at the Bank of England, reporting directly to the Governor.

According to the original charter of 27 July 1694 the Bank's affairs would be supervised by a Governor, the Deputy Governor and 24 directors. Since then, however, the role of Deputy Governor has been split and redefined three times (by the Bank of England Act 1998, the Financial Services Act 2012 and again in 2014), such that, as of May 2016, there are four Deputy Governors (Sir Jon Cunliffe, Ben Broadbent, Sam Woods and Sir David Ramsden). They have special responsibility for financial stability, monetary policy, prudential regulation and markets and banking respectively. In 2013, the position of Chief Operating Officer (COO) was created and has the same status and remuneration as a Deputy Governor.

Under Schedule 1 of the Bank of England Act 1998 (as amended), Deputy Governors are appointed for five year terms, and are term-limited to two terms.

== Deputy Governors of the Bank of England (1694–present) ==
=== As sole occupant (1694–1998) ===
Name	In office
Michael Godfrey	1694–1695
Sir William Scawen	1695–1697
Nathaniel Tench	1697–1699
John Ward	1699–1701
Abraham Houblon	1701–1703
Sir James Bateman	1703–1705
Sir Francis Eyles	1705–1707
William Bouverie	1707–1709
Nathaniel Gould	1709–1711
John Rudge	1711–1713
Sir Peter Delme	1713–1715
Sir Gerard Conyers	1715–1717
John Hanger	1717–1719
Sir Thomas Scawen	1719–1721
Josiah Diston	1721–1723
William Thompson	1723–1725
Humphry Morice	1725–1727
Samuel Holden	1727–1729
Sir Edward Bellamy	1729–1731
John Olmius	1731
Horatio Townshend	1732–1733
Bryan Benson	1733–1735
Thomas Cooke	1735–1737
Nathaniel Gould	1737–1738
Delillers Carbonnel	1738–1740
Stamp Brooksbank	1740–1741
William Fawkener	1740–1743
Charles Savage	1743–1745
Benjamin Longuet	1745–1747
William Hunt	1747–1749
Benjamin Lethieullier	1749–1750
Alexander Sheafe	1750–1752
Charles Palmer	1752–1754
Matthews Beachcroft	1754–1756
Merrik Burrell	1756–1758
Bartholomew Burton	1758–1760
Robert Marsh	1760–1762
John Weyland	1762–1764
Matthew Clarmont	1764–1766
Samuel Fludyer	1766–1768
William Cooper	1768–1769
Edward Payne	1769–1771
James Sperling	1771–1773
Samuel Beachcroft	1773–1775
James Langston	1775–1776
Peter Gaussen	1776–1777
Daniel Booth	1777–1779
William Ewer	1779–1781
Richard Neave	1781–1783
George Peters	1783–1785
Edward Darell	1785–1787
Mark Weyland	1787–1789
Samuel Bosanquet	1789–1791
Godfrey Thornton	1791–1793
Daniel Giles	1793–1795
Thomas Raikes	1795–1797
Samuel Thornton	1797–1799
Job Mathew Raikes	1799–1801
Joseph Nutt	1801–1802
Benjamin Winthrop	1802–1804
Beeston Long	1804–1806
Brook Bart	1806–1807
John Whitmore	1807–1808
John Pearse	1808–1810
William Manning	1810–1812
William Mellish	1812–1814
Jeremiah Harman	1814–1816
George Dorrien	1816–1818
Charles Pole	1818–1820
John Bowden	1820–1822
Cornelius Buller	1822–1824
John Baker Richards	1824–1826
Samuel Drewe	1826–1828
John Palmer	1828–1830
Andrew Thomson	1830–1832
Richard Mee Raikes	1832–1833
James Pattison	1833–1834
Timothy Curtis	1834–1837
John Bart	1837–1839
Sir John Henry Pelly	1839–1841
William Cotton	1841–1842
John Benjamin Heath	1842–1845
William Robinson	1845–1847
James Morris	1847
Henry James Prescott	1847–1849
Thomson Hankey	1849–1851
John Hubbard	1851–1853
Thomas Matthias Weguelin	1853–1855
Sheffield Neave	1855–1857
Bonamy Dobrée	1857–1859
Alfred Latham	1859–1861
Kirkman Hodgson	1861–1863
Henry Lancelot Holland	1863–1865
Thomas Newman Hunt	1865–1867
Robert Wigram Crawford	1867–1869
George Lyall	1869–1871
Benjamin Buck Greene	1871–1873
Henry Hucks Gibbs	1873–1875
Edward Howley Palmer	1875–1877
John William Birch	1877–1879
Henry Riversdale Grenfell	1879–1881
John Saunders Gilliat	1881–1883
James Pattison Currie	1883–1885
Mark Wilks Collet	1885–1887
William Lidderdale	1877–1889
David Powell	1889–1892
Clifford Wigram	1892–1894
Albert George Sandeman	1894–1895
Hugh Colin Smith	1895–1897
Samuel Gladstone	1897–1899
Augustus Steuart Prevost	1899–1901
Samuel Hope Morley	1901–1903
Alexander Falconer Wallace	1903–1905
William Middleton Campbell	1905–1907
Edgar Lubbock	1907
Reginald Eden Johnston	1907–1909
Alfred Clayton Cole	1909–1911
Lord Walter Cunliffe	1911–1913
Robert Newman	1913–1915
Sir Brien Cokayne	1915–1918
Sir Montagu Collet Norman	1918–1920
Henry Trotter	1920–1923
Cecil Lubbock	1923–1925
Alan Garrett Anderson	1925–1926
Henry Trotter	1926–1927
Cecil Lubbock	1927–1929
Ernest Musgrave Harvey	1929–1936
Basil G. Catterns	1936–1945
Cameron Cobbold	1945–1949
Dallas Bernard	1949–1954
Humphrey Mynors	1954–1964
Leslie O'Brien	1964–1966
Maurice Parsons	1966–1970
Jasper Hollom	1970–1980
Christopher McMahon	1980–1986
George Blunden	1986–1990
Sir Edward George	1990–1993
Rupert Pennant-Rea	1993–1995
Howard Davies	1995–1997
David Clementi	1997–1998

=== With specific responsibility (1998–present) ===
The Bank of England Act 1998, which came into force on 1 June 1998, created a second Deputy Governorship. Clementi became Deputy Governor for Financial Stability for the rest of his term, and Mervyn King became the first Deputy Governor for Monetary Policy.

Financial Stability		Monetary Policy		Prudential Regulation		Markets and Banking	
Name	In office	Name	In office	Name	In office	Name	In office
David Clementi	1998–2002	Mervyn King	1998–2003				
Andrew Large	2002–2006	Rachel Lomax	2003–2008				
John Gieve	2006–2009	Charlie Bean	2008–2014				
Paul Tucker	2009–2013						
Financial Services Act 2012 creates new Deputy Governor for Prudential Regulation
Paul Tucker	2009–2013	Charlie Bean	2008–2014	Andrew Bailey	2013–2016		
Jon Cunliffe	2013–						
Deputy Governor for Markets and Banking created
Jon Cunliffe	2013–2023	Ben Broadbent	2014–2024	Andrew Bailey	2013–2016	Nemat Shafik	2014–2017
Sarah Breeden	2023–	Clare Lombardelli	2024–	Sam Woods	2016–2026	Charlotte Hogg	2017
				Katharine Braddick	2026-	Sir David Ramsden	2017–

== Chief operating officers ==
In June 2013, the position of chief operating officer (COO) of the Bank of England was created. The COO has responsibility for the day-to-day operations of the Bank. They have the same status and remuneration as a Deputy Governor.

Name	In office
Charlotte Hogg	2013–2017
Joanna Place	2017–present

== See also ==
- Chief Cashier of the Bank of England
- Governor of the Bank of England

== Bibliography ==
- "Deputy Governors of the Bank of England" (PDF). Bank of England. Archived from the original (PDF) on 4 January 2014.
- "Select Committee on Monetary Policy Committee of the Bank of England First Report-Appendix 3". HMSO. 2001. Archived from the original on 4 January 2014.
- "Appointment of Deputy Governor for Prudential Regulation". HM Government. 19 February 2013.
