= Kit McMahon =

British banker (1927–2024)

Sir Christopher William McMahon (10 July 1927 – 20 November 2024) was a British banker who was the executive director of the Bank of England from 1970 to 1980 and deputy governor from 1980 to 1986.

== Life and career ==
McMahon was born in Melbourne, Australia, on 10 July 1927 to Dr. J.J. McMahon and Mrs McMahon (née Brown)..He was educated at Melbourne Grammar School and the University of Melbourne before emigrating to the United Kingdom in 1951.

In 1999, the National Portrait Gallery, London, acquired a portrait of him by Australian photographer Polly Borland for its permanent collection. He was made a Fellow of Birkbeck after being a Governor there for at least 12 years.

McMahon died on 20 November 2024, at the age of 97.
