= James Morris (banker) =

Governor of the Bank of England

James Morris was Governor of the Bank of England from 1847 to 1849. He had been Deputy Governor in 1847. He replaced William Robinson as Governor and was succeeded by Henry James Prescot. Morris's tenure as Governor occurred during the Panic of 1847.

== See also ==
- Chief Cashier of the Bank of England
