= George Dorrien =

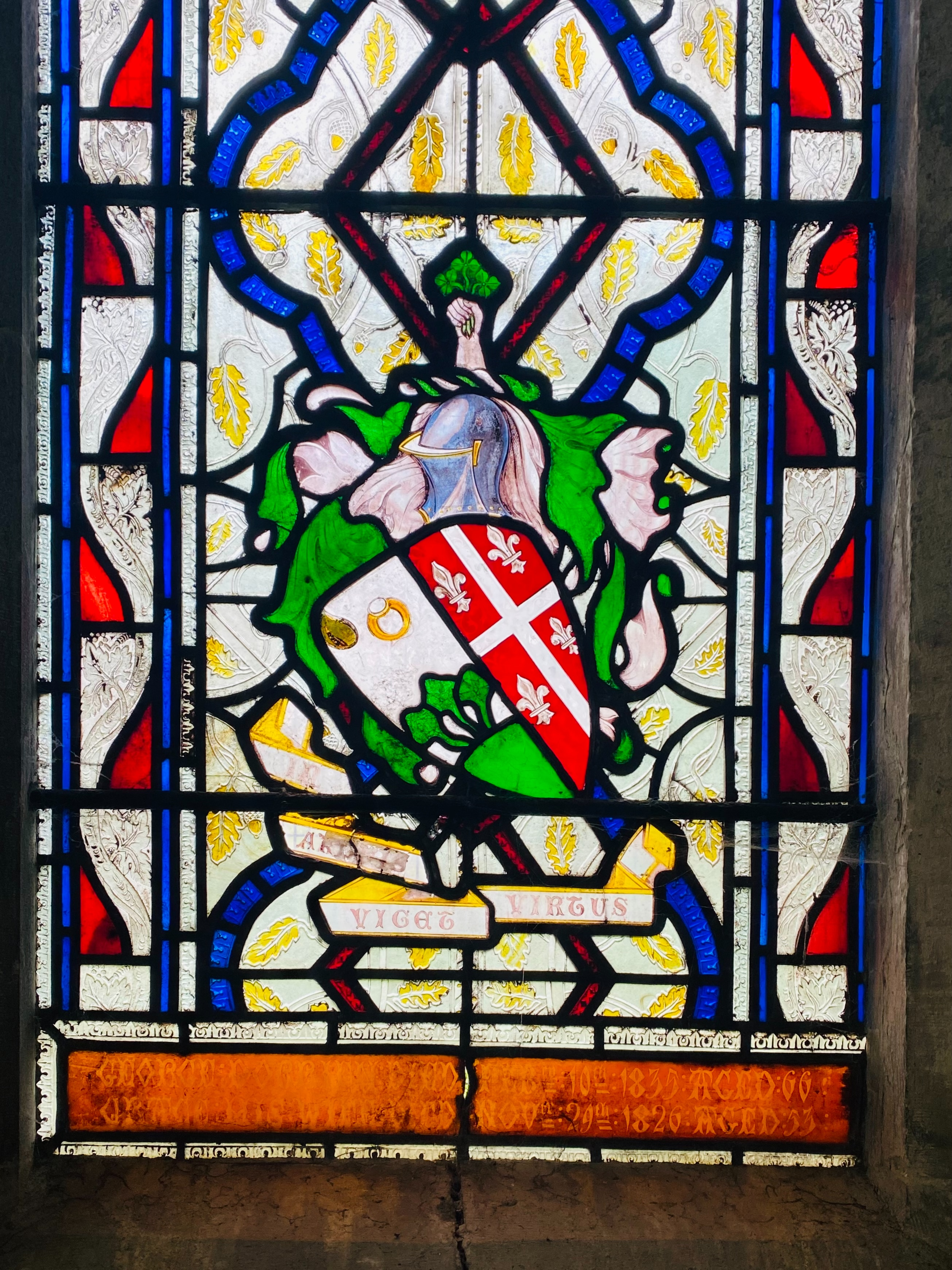
George Dorrien's coat of arms in a stained-glass window in St Peter's Church, Berkhamsted

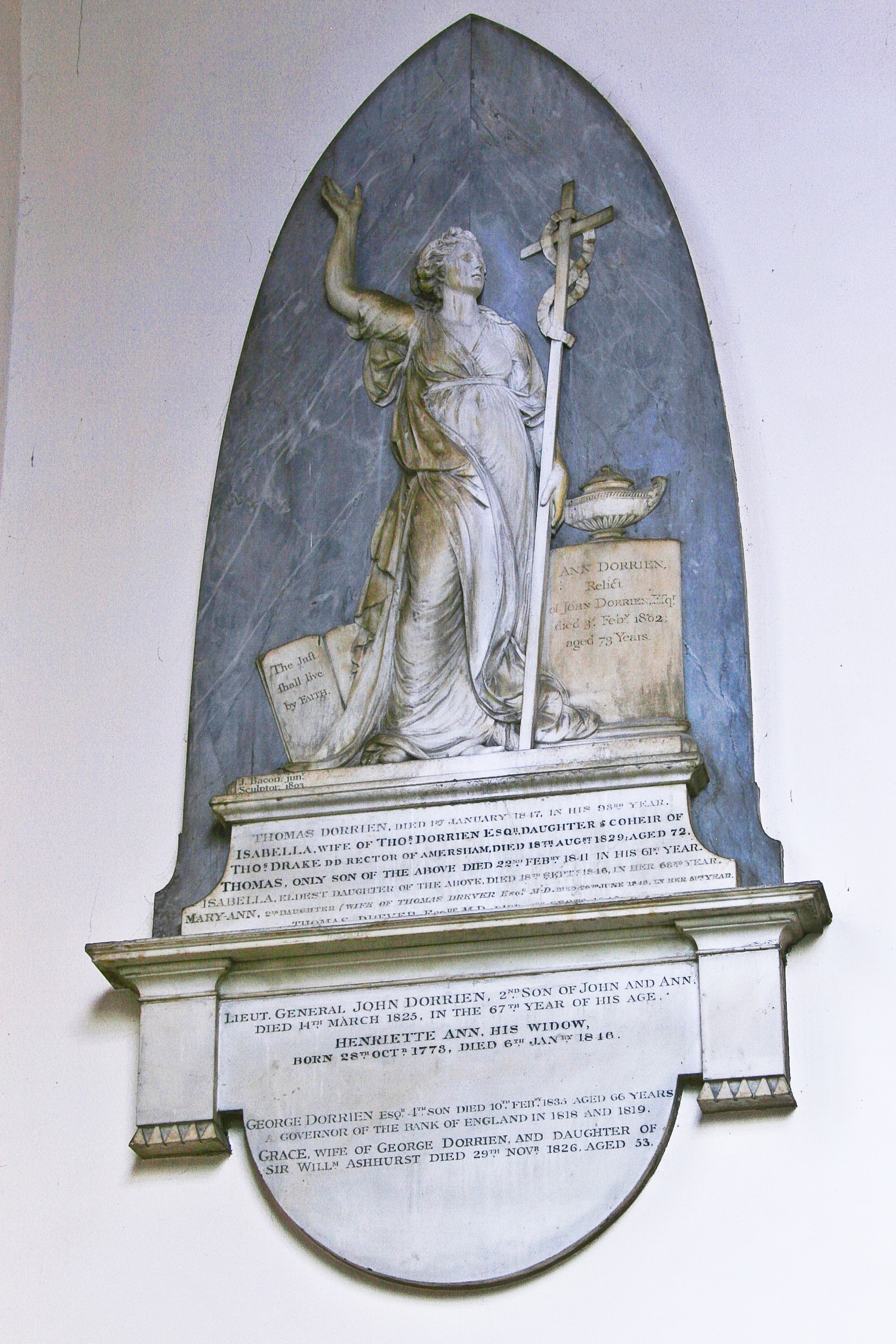
Dorrien Family wall monument in St Peter's Church, Berkhamsted

George Dorrien (1769 – 10 February 1835) was Governor of the Bank of England from 1818 to 1820.

== Family and early life ==
George Dorrien was born in 1769, the fourth son of John and Ann Dorrien. John Dorrien (c. 1714-1784) was a merchant banker from London. His family were originally German Lutherans, linked to the Lutheran Church of the Holy Trinity the Less in London. John Dorrien was a partner in the bank of Dorrien, Rucker and Carlton and the chairman of the East India Company.

George Dorrien married Grace Ashurst (1773—1826), daughter of Sir William Ashurst.

== Career ==
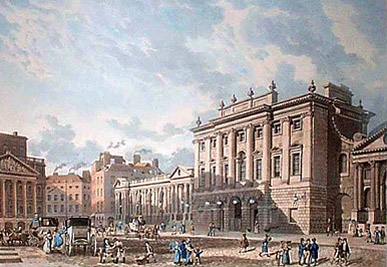
The Bank of England pictured in 1816

Dorrien joined the Bank of England's board of directors in 1794, and served during the Panic of 1796–1797 when the Bank enacted a stoppage on specie payments at the start of the Restriction period.

Dorrien served as Deputy Governor of the Bank of England from 1816 to 1818. He then replaced Jeremiah Harman as Governor of the Bank of England in 1818, and remained in the post until 1820, when he was succeeded by Charles Pole.

Dorrien's tenure as Governor occurred during the Panic of 1819.

== Death and memorials ==
Grace died on 29 November 1826 and George Dorrien died on 10 February 1835. They were laid to rest in the family crypt in the Church of St Peter, Great Berkhamsted, where their names are inscribed on a white marble wall monument in the north transept commemorating nine members of the older Dorrien family, designed by the sculptor John Bacon the Younger. George Dorrien's heraldic achievement is also visible in the adjacent stained-glass window by James Powell and Sons.

== See also ==
- Chief Cashier of the Bank of England
