= James Pattison (banker) =

Governor of the Bank of England

- Occupation: Governor

James Pattison was Governor of the Bank of England from 1834 to 1837. He had been Deputy Governor from 1833 to 1834. He replaced Richard Mee Raikes as Governor and was succeeded by Timothy Abraham Curtis.

In 1825 he was a director of the New Zealand Company, a venture chaired by the wealthy John George Lambton, Whig MP (and later 1st Earl of Durham), that made the first attempt to colonise New Zealand.

== See also ==
- Chief Cashier of the Bank of England
