= Mark Weyland =

Mark Weyland was Governor of the Bank of England from 1789 to 1791. He had been Deputy Governor from 1787 to 1789. He replaced Edward Darell as Governor and was succeeded by Samuel Bosanquet.

== See also ==
- Chief Cashier of the Bank of England
