= Colgrain =

Village in Argyll and Bute, Scotland

Coordinates: 55.985°N 4.686°W

- Location within Argyll and Bute
- OS grid reference: NS323802
- Council area: Argyll and Bute
- Country: Scotland
- Sovereign state: United Kingdom
- Post town: DUMBARTON
- Postcode district: G82
- Police: Scotland
- Fire: Scottish
- Ambulance: Scottish
- UK Parliament: Argyll, Bute and South Lochaber
- Scottish Parliament: Dumbarton

Colgrain is a village in Argyll and Bute, Scotland, located to the east of Helensburgh.

The name Colgrain is known from at least 1377 when Sir William Denzeltoun (of Colgrane) gives his consent to a grant made by his father, Sir John Denzeltoun of that Ilk, to the church of Glasgow.

== See also ==
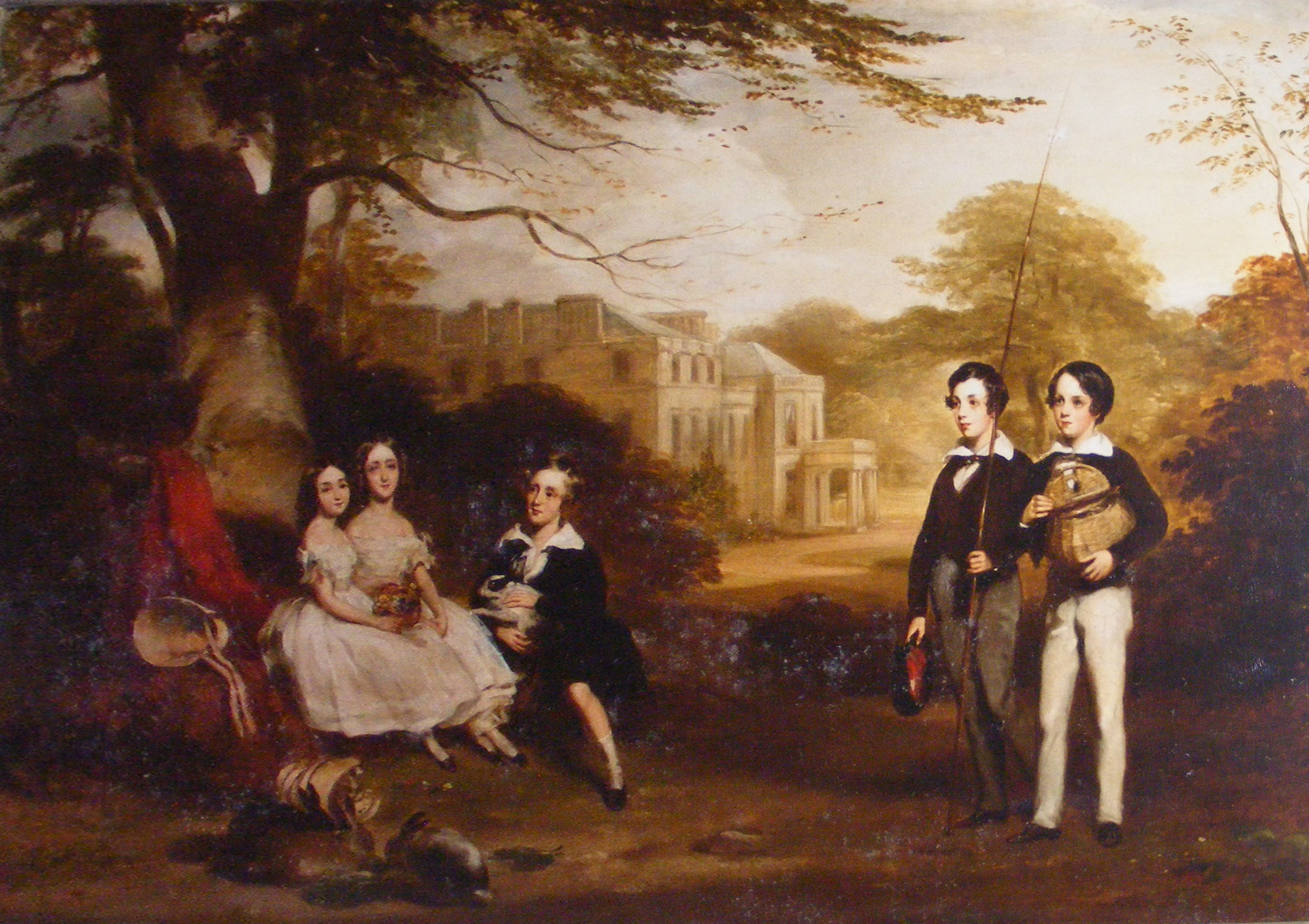
Janet Hamilton Campbell Conversation Pictures - Children of Colin Campbell of Colgrain and Camis Eskan by Daniel Macnee, 1845

Camis Eskan House, a listed building in Colgrain

- Jock Campbell, Baron Campbell of Eskan 'of Camis Eskan in the County of Dumbarton'. His great grandfather Colin Campbell (Junior) of Colgrain and Camis Eskan (1818–86), a wealthy sugar merchant who owned plantations in British Guiana.
