= Edward Darell =

English merchant and banker (1728 - 1814)

English merchant and banker
- Born: 1728
- Died: 1814 (aged 85–86)
- Occupation: Banker

Edward Darell (1728–1814) was an English merchant and Governor of the Bank of England from 1787 to 1789.

He was the son of Robert Darell of Richmond, and his wife Mary Porten, daughter of James Porten, and sister of Judith Porten who was Gibbon's mother. He had a younger brother Robert, born in 1734. He was a first cousin of Edward Gibbon who made Darell one of his three executors in his will of 1791.

Darell acted as a Bank of England director from c.1771 to 1804. He was Deputy Governor from 1785 to 1787. He replaced George Peters as Governor and was succeeded by Mark Weyland.

Darell's London address was New Street, Hanover Square in 1803. His brother Robert, of Sackville Street, had died in 1801, and had served as deputy governor of the South Sea Company. They had been in business together at 4 Union Court, Old Broad Street.

== See also ==
- Chief Cashier of the Bank of England
