= Cornelius Buller =

English banker (1772-1849)

- Born: 22 March 1772
- Died: 11 April 1849 (aged 77)
- Occupations: banker, Governor of the Bank of England from 1824–26
- Spouse: Mary Down (m. 1801)
- Children: 10

Cornelius Buller (22 March 1772 – 11 April 1849) was an English banker who served as Governor of the Bank of England from 1824 to 1826.

== Life ==
He was the eldest son of Richard Buller of Devonshire Place, London, who died in 1824 at age 91.

Buller had been Deputy Governor from 1822 to 1824. He replaced John Bowden as Governor and was succeeded by John Baker Richards.

Buller's tenure as Governor occurred during the Panic of 1825. In the early days of December 1825, he recused himself from efforts to save the bank Pole, Thornton & Down, leaving the issue to his deputy Richards because of his family connections to the bank.

In 1831, Buller was head of R. Buller & Co. of Lothbury when it failed. In the aftermath he sold his Bank of England stock, making him ineligible to continue as a director of the Bank.

Buller died in Kensington in 1849.

== Family ==
Buller, then a merchant of Crosby Square, married Mary Down, daughter of Richard Down, on 4 May 1801. The couple had seven sons and three daughters.

Buller was from a prominent Cornish family that included Sir Richard Buller, General Sir George Buller, General Sir Redvers Buller and the Barons Churston.

== See also ==
- Chief Cashier of the Bank of England
