= William Robinson (banker) =

Governor of the Bank of England

William Robinson was Governor of the Bank of England from April to August 1847. He had been Deputy Governor from 1845 to 1847. He replaced John Benjamin Heath as Governor and was succeeded by James Morris. Robinson's tenure as Governor occurred during the Panic of 1847.

Robinson, a corn dealer, was unable to serve his full two-year term as governor due to his personal bankruptcy during the period.

== See also ==
- Chief Cashier of the Bank of England
