= William Burton (died 1781) =

British Whig politician

William Burton (c. 1695–1781), of Ashwell and North Luffenham, Rutland, was a British Whig politician who sat in the House of Commons from 1730 to 1734.

Burton was the eldest son of Bartholomew Burton of Ashwell, receiver-general of the excise, and his wife Susanna Gregory, daughter of George Gregory. He was admitted at Middle Temple in 1703. He purchased North Luffenham Manor (Bassetts Manor) from Baptist Noel, 4th Earl of Gainsborough in 1729.

Burton was returned as a Whig Member of Parliament for Rutland at a by-election on 12 February 1730. He seconded the Address on 21 January 1731 and on 16 March 1732 supported a motion that a qualification in the public funds might be as valid as a landed qualification. He did not stand at the 1734 British general election. Walpole gave him a place as Commissioner of excise in 1737 which he held until 1776 when he was forced to retire on grounds of ill-health. In April 1738, Burton married Elizabeth Pitt, daughter of George Pitt of Strathfieldsaye, Hampshire. He sold North Luffenham Manor to Sir Gilbert Heathcote, 3rd Baronet in 1764.

Burton died on 30 January 1781, leaving one daughter. His brother Bartholomew Burton was a Governor of the Bank of England and MP.

Parliament of Great Britain
Preceded by Lord Finch; Thomas Noel	Member of Parliament for Rutland; 1730–1734; With: Thomas Noel	Succeeded by James Noel; Thomas Noel
