= Register of British Slave-Traders =

Public online database

The Register of British Slave-Traders
- Website type: Online database
- Country of origin: United Kingdom
- Editor: William Pettigrew
- Website: britishslavetraders.org
- Commercial: No
- Launched: September 2026

The Register of British Slave-Traders is an online database listing 13,000 named individuals who invested in the British slave trade, from the 16th to 19th centuries.

The database, launched publicly in September 2026, is the result of three years' research by a team of nine, from institutions including Lancaster University and Manchester University, led by William Pettigrew of King's College London. It was funded by the Arts and Humanities Research Council.

Among those documented are shareholders in the Company of Royal Adventurers into Africa, the Company of Royal Adventurers Trading to Africa, the Royal African Company and the South Sea Company.

The database and its notable entries were the basis and subject of a two-part BBC series by David Olusoga, Finding Britain's Slave Traders, broadcast in September 2026.

Pettigrew's book based on the project, Britain's Slave Traders: A Forgotten History, was published in the same month.

== See also ==
- Legacies of British Slavery
- Slavery in the United Kingdom
- List of officials and shareholders in the Royal African Company, 1672
