= Richard Mee Raikes =

English banker, Governor of the Bank of England (1784–1863)

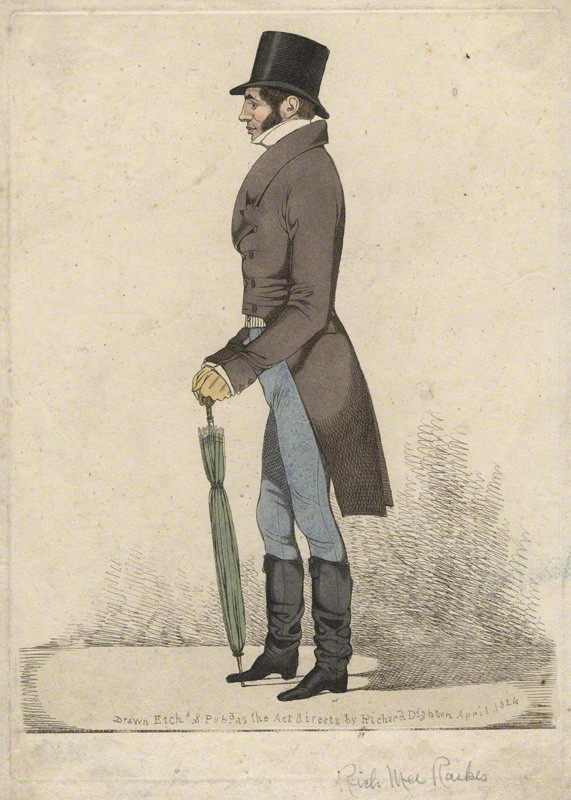
- Richard Mee Raikes, 1824 etching
- Born: 1784
- Died: 1863 (aged 78–79)
- Occupation: Banker

Richard Mee Raikes (1784–1863) was an English banker, Governor of the Bank of England from 1833 to 1834. He had been Deputy Governor from 1832 to 1833. He replaced John Horsley Palmer as Governor and was succeeded by James Pattison. He was bankrupted in 1834.

== See also ==
- Chief Cashier of the Bank of England
