= Sir Richard Neave, 1st Baronet =

British merchant and banker

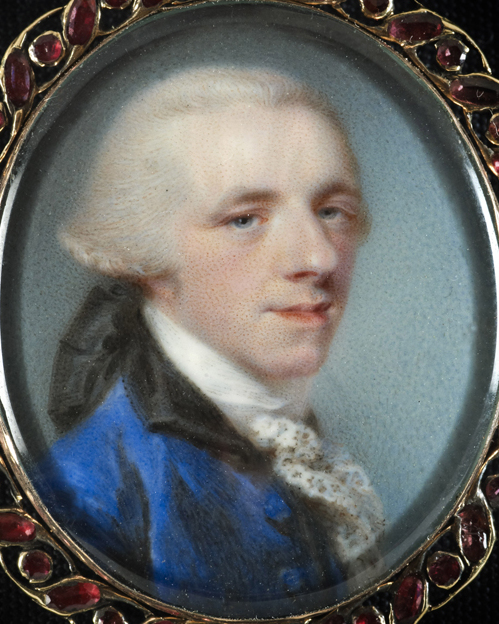
Portrait of Sir Richard Neave, by Jeremiah Meyer

Sir Richard Neave, 1st Baronet (22 November 1731 – 28 January 1814) was a British merchant and a Governor of the Bank of England.

== Life ==
Neave was the son of James Neave and Susanna Trueman. He developed considerable interests in the West Indies and the Americas and was chairman at various times of the Ramsgate Harbour Trust, the Society of West Indian Merchants and the London Dock Company, as well as a director of the Hudson's Bay Company. Neave was a friend of George Read of Delaware who wrote to warn him in 1765 that the British government's attempts to tax the colonies without giving them direct representation in Parliament would lead to independence.

Neave lived in Bower House in Havering-atte-Bower but sought to elevate himself from merchant to country gentleman and purchased Dagnam Park in 1772. Neave had the original Dagnams demolished, probably between 1772 and 1776 and replaced by a red-brick Georgian house nine bays wide by four deep with a curved, central three-bay projection to the south front.

He was a director of the Bank of England for 48 years, made Deputy Governor in 1781 and Governor from 1783 to 1785. Neave's tenure as Governor occurred during the end of the Bengal bubble crash (1769–1784). In 1794, he was appointed High Sheriff of Essex. He was a Fellow of the Society of Antiquaries of London and, in 1785, was elected a Fellow of the Royal Society. He was created a baronet on 13 May 1795.

== Family ==
Neave married Frances Bristow, daughter of John Bristow, MP and merchant, in 1761. The couple had four sons and five daughters, one son and one daughter dying young. The Dowager Lady Neave survived her husband, dying on 18 January 1830 at home on Albemarle Street, Mayfair, aged 86.

- The eldest daughter Frances married Governor of the Bank of England Beeston Long; in 1806, both Neave and Long served as vice-presidents of the London Institution.
- The second daughter Catherine Mary married the antiquarian Henry Howard.
- The third daughter Harriet married the Rev. George Trevelyan.

The youngest daughter Caroline Hannah Neave, born 23 March 1781, never married. She devoted her life to improving the treatment of women and children in prisons, refuges and convict ships. She died on 7 December 1863.

Richard and Frances Neave, double portrait

Neave and his wife were painted, in a double portrait, by Thomas Gainsborough around 1765 (private collection).

Coat of arms of Sir Richard Neave, 1st Baronet
| Crest Out of a ducal coronet Gold a lily stalked and leaved Vert flowered and seeded Or. Escutcheon Argent on a cross Sable five fleurs-de-lis Or. Motto Sola Proba Quae Honesta |

Government offices
| Preceded by William Ewer | Governor of the Bank of England; 1783–1785 | Succeeded by George Peters |
Baronetage of Great Britain
| New title | Baronet (of Dagnam Park); 1795–1814 | Succeeded by Sir Thomas Neave, 2nd Baronet |
Honorary titles
| Preceded by | High Sheriff of Essex; 1794–1795 | Succeeded by John Hanson |
