= John Baker Richards =

English banker (1776–1833)

- Born: 1776
- Died: 21 November 1833 (aged 56–57)
- Occupation: Banker

John Baker Richards FSA (1776 – 21 November 1833) was an English banker who was Governor of the Bank of England from 1826 to 1828. He had been Deputy Governor from 1824 to 1826. He replaced Cornelius Buller as Governor and was succeeded by Samuel Drewe.

== See also ==
- Chief Cashier of the Bank of England
