= Godfrey Thornton =

English merchant and banker (died 1805)

Godfrey Thornton (died 1805) was an English merchant and banker, Governor of the Bank of England from 1793 to 1795. He had been Deputy Governor from 1791 to 1793. He replaced Samuel Bosanquet as Governor and was succeeded by Daniel Giles.

== See also ==
- Chief Cashier of the Bank of England
