= Benjamin Winthrop =

Benjamin Winthrop was Governor of the Bank of England from 1804 to 1806. He had been Deputy Governor from 1802 to 1804. He replaced Joseph Nutt as Governor and was succeeded by Beeston Long.

== See also ==
- Chief Cashier of the Bank of England
