= Henry James Prescott =

Governor of the Bank of England (1802–1856)

- Born: 5 July 1802
- Died: 13 August 1856 (aged 54)
- Occupation: Governor

Henry James Prescott (5 July 1802 – 13 August 1856) was Governor of the Bank of England from 1849 to 1851. He had been Deputy Governor from 1847 to 1849. He replaced James Morris as Governor and was succeeded by Thomson Hankey.

He was the son of William Willoughby Prescott of Hendon, the younger son of Sir George William Prescott, 1st Baronet. He attended Harrow School. He had a brother, William George Prescott, also a banker.

He died in Brighton, aged 54.

== See also ==
- Chief Cashier of the Bank of England
