= Daniel Giles =

British merchant and banker (c. 1725–1800)

- Born: 1725
- Died: 1800 (aged 74–75)
- Occupation: Banker

Daniel Giles (c. 1725–1800) was a London merchant and banker, the son of Huguenot immigrant parents.

== Life ==
Giles was Governor of the Bank of England from 1795 to 1797. He had been Deputy Governor from 1793 to 1795. He replaced Godfrey Thornton as Governor and was succeeded by Thomas Raikes. Giles's tenure as Governor occurred during the Panic of 1796–97. In June 2020, the Bank of England issued a public apology for the involvement of Giles, amongst other employees, in the slave trade following the investigation by the Centre for the Study of the Legacies of British Slave-ownership at UCL.

In 1796, he bought the Youngsbury estate in Thundridge, Hertfordshire.

== Family ==
Giles married Elizabeth Messman. Daniel Giles (1761–1831) the barrister and Member of Parliament was their son.

== See also ==
- Chief Cashier of the Bank of England
