= Samuel Drewe =

Governor of the Bank of England (1759–1837)

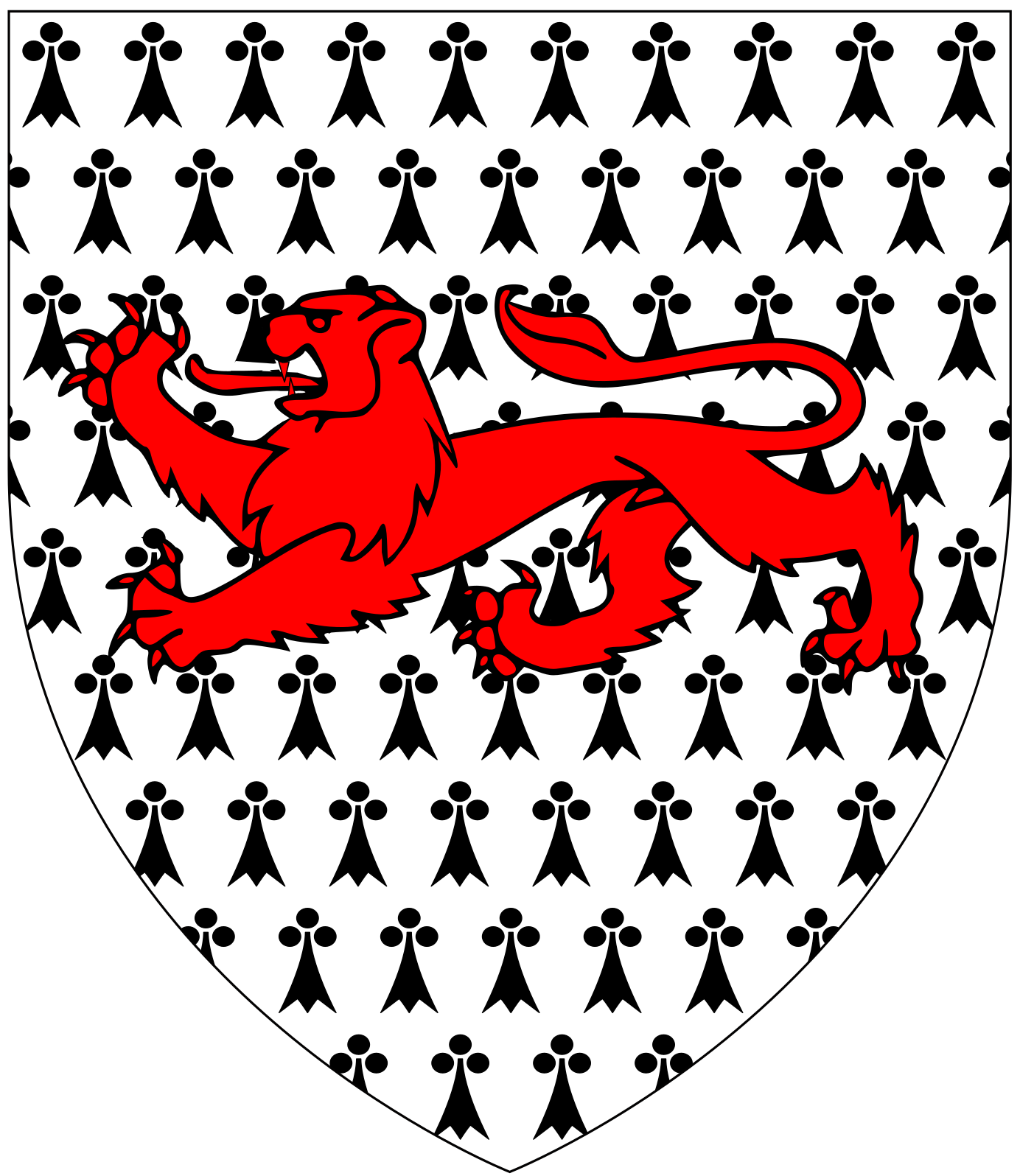
Arms of Drewe of The Grange, Broadhembury, Devon: Ermine, a lion passant gules

Samuel Drewe (1759–1837) of Kensington in Middlesex, was Governor of the Bank of England from 1828 to 1830. He had been Deputy Governor from 1826 to 1828. He replaced John Baker Richards as Governor and was succeeded by John Horsley Palmer.

== Origins ==
He was the 9th son (2nd son by his second marriage) of Francis Drewe (1712–1773) of Grange in the parish of Broadhembury in Devon, Sheriff of Devon in 1738, by his second wife Mary Johnson, daughter of Thomas Johnson of London. His sister Mary Drewe (d.1830) married John Fownes Luttrell (1752–1816) of Dunster Castle, MP.

== Marriage and children ==
He married Selina Thackery, by whom he had children as follows:

- Frederick William Drewe, only son.
- Emma Louisa Drewe, eldest daughter, heiress of Wootton House, Wootton Fitzpaine, Dorset, who married her first cousin Lt-Col Francis Fownes Luttrell (1792–1862) of Kilve Court, Somerset and of Wootton House (3rd son of John Fownes Luttrell (1752–1816) of Dunster Castle, MP), Lt-Col of the Grenadier Guards who fought and was wounded at the Battle of Waterloo in 1815 and was Lt-Col of the Somerset Militia in 1839. Francis's portrait in the library of Dunster Castle shows him in military uniform with his right eye missing, a battle wound. Her son was George Fownes Luttrell (1826–1910), of Dunster Castle, JP, DL, Sheriff of Somerset in 1874.
- Augusta Drewe

== See also ==
- Chief Cashier of the Bank of England
