= Charles Palmer (banker) =

Governor of the Bank of England in 1754–1756

Charles Palmer was Governor of the Bank of England from 1754 to 1756. He had been Deputy Governor from 1752 to 1754. He replaced Alexander Sheafe as Governor and was succeeded by Matthews Beachcroft.

== See also ==
- Chief Cashier of the Bank of England
