= John Benjamin Heath =

Governor of the Bank of England (1790–1879)

- Born: 1790
- Died: 1879 (aged 88–89)
- Occupation: Governor

John Benjamin Heath FRS FSA (6 June 1790 – 16 January 1879) was Governor of the Bank of England from 1845 to 1847.

== Early life ==
He was born the son of the merchant John Heath and grandson of the scholar Benjamin Heath. He was educated at Harrow School.

== Career ==
Like his father, he became a successful London merchant who was appointed to be Deputy Governor of the Bank of England from 1842 to 1845, replaced William Cotton as Governor and was succeeded in turn by William Robinson.

He was elected a Fellow of the Society of Antiquaries in 1832 and a Fellow of the Royal Society in 1843.

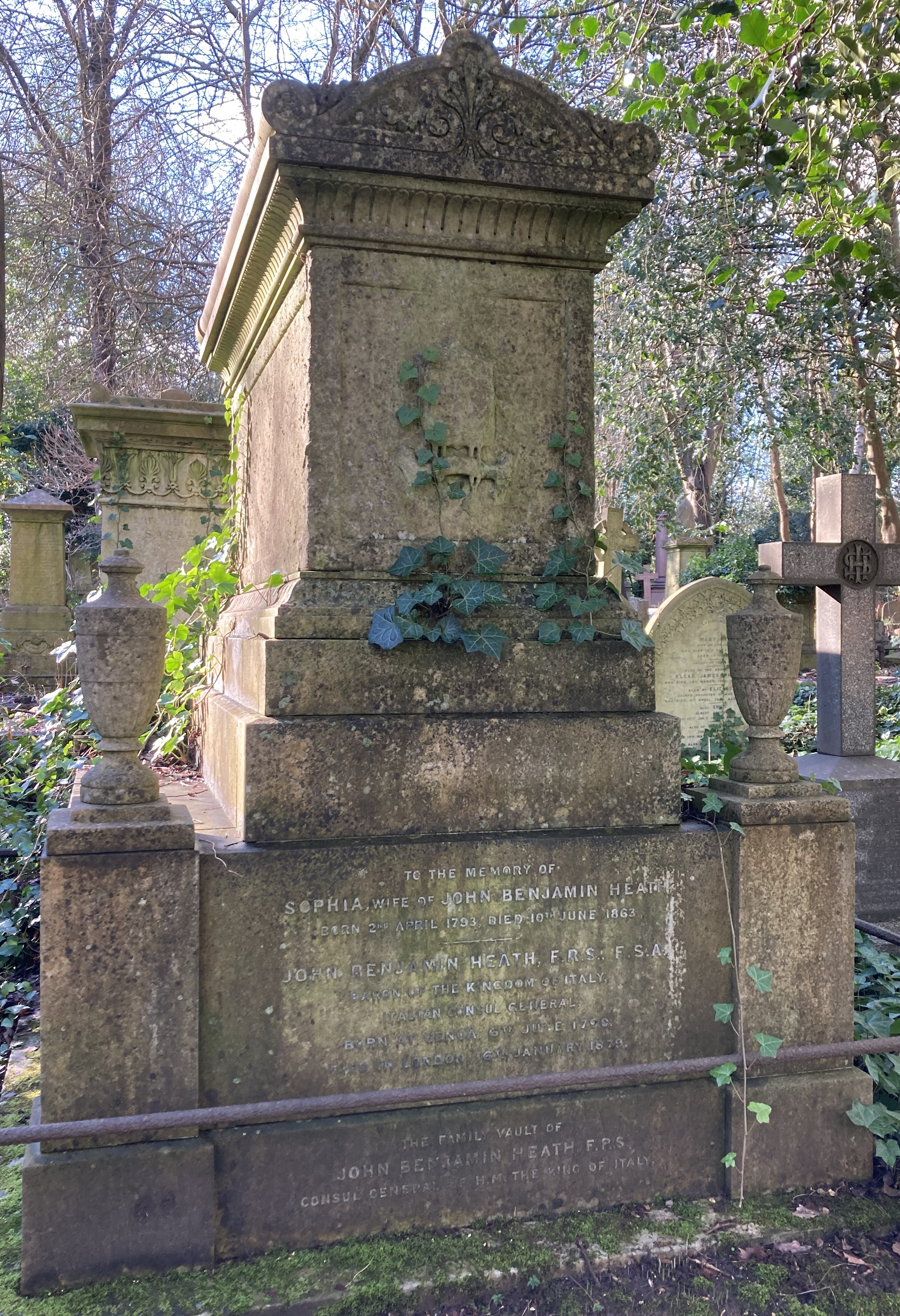
Family grave of Heath in Highgate Cemetery

Heath was appointed Consul General to the King of Sardinia and in 1867 he was created a Baron of the Kingdom of Italy.

On his death in 1879 he was buried in Highgate Cemetery.

== Personal life ==
Heath married Sophia Bland, the daughter of physician Robert Bland and brother of Australian pioneer William Bland.

== See also ==
- Chief Cashier of the Bank of England
