= William Cooper (banker) =

Governor of the Bank of England from 1769 to 1771

William Cooper was Governor of the Bank of England from 1769 to 1771. He had been Deputy Governor from 1768 to 1769. He replaced Matthew Clarmont as Governor and was succeeded by Edward Payne. Cooper's tenure as Governor occurred during the Bengal bubble crash (1769–1784).

== See also ==
- Chief Cashier of the Bank of England
