= William Scawen (banker) =

British MP and Governor of the Bank of England

Sir William Scawen

Governor of the Bank of England
- In office 1697–1699
- Preceded by: John Houblon
- Succeeded by: Nathaniel Tench

Personal details
- Born: c. 1644
- Died: 18 October 1722
- Spouse: Mary Maynard
- Parent: Robert Scawen (father)
- Relatives: Thomas Scawen (brother); Thomas Scawen (nephew)

Sir William Scawen (c. 1644 – 18 October 1722) was a British MP and Governor of the Bank of England.

== Early life ==
Scawen was born in 1644. His father was Robert Scawen of Horton, Buckinghamshire.

== Career ==
Scawen was knighted in 1692. After some years in business he was appointed a Director of the Bank of England in 1694 and again from 1699 until his death. He was elevated to Deputy Governor in 1695 and to Governor in 1697 (until 1699). He was also a Director of the East India Company from 1710 to 1712. In 1696 he had sufficient wealth to purchase a half interest in Carshalton manor.

Scawen entered Parliament as the MP for New Windsor in 1693, sitting until 1698, when he was again returned as the MP for Grampound in 1698 and twice in 1701 (being in December 1701 also elected for Truro). This was followed by two terms as MP for Surrey from 1705 to 1710 and from 1721 to 1722.

== Personal life ==
Scawen married Mary, the daughter of Sir William Maynard, 1st Baronet of Walthamstow, Essex but had no legitimate children. He left the Horton estate to his brother Thomas and the rest of his considerable estates in Buckinghamshire, Surrey, Yorkshire, Cornwall and Ireland to his nephew Thomas, Thomas's son.

Government offices
Preceded by Sir John Houblon	Governor of the Bank of England; 1697 – 1699	Succeeded by Nathaniel Tench
