= Robert Marsh (banker) =

34th Governor of the Bank of England

Robert Marsh was Governor of the Bank of England from 1762 to 1764. He had been Deputy Governor from 1760 to 1762. He replaced Bartholomew Burton as Governor and was succeeded by John Weyland. Marsh's tenure as Governor occurred during the Bengal bubble (1757–1769).

== See also ==
- Chief Cashier of the Bank of England
