= Benjamin Longuet =

English banker (1685-1761)

- Born: 1685
- Died: 1761 (aged 75–76)
- Occupation: banker

Benjamin Longuet (1685 – 21 February 1761) was an English banker who served as Governor of the Bank of England from 1747 to 1749, and who was a director of the bank from 1734 until his death. He had been Deputy Governor from 1745 to 1747. He replaced Charles Savage as Governor and was succeeded by William Hunt.

Longuet, one of several Bank of England governors of French Huguenot descent, was the son of John (or Samuel) Longuet, and was likely a grandson of Jean Longuet of Bayeux. His family were successful merchants in London. He died unmarried.

== See also ==
- Chief Cashier of the Bank of England
