= Matthews Beachcroft =

Governor of the Bank of England and Deputy Governor of England

- Occupation(s): Governor of the Bank of England (1756 to 1758); Deputy Governor (1754 to 1756)

Matthews Beachcroft was Governor of the Bank of England from 1756 to 1758. He had been Deputy Governor from 1754 to 1756. He replaced Charles Palmer as Governor and was succeeded by Merrick Burrell. Beachcroft's tenure as Governor occurred at the beginning of the Bengal bubble (1757–1769).

== See also ==
- Chief Cashier of the Bank of England
