= Charles Savage (banker) =

Governor of the Bank of England in 1745–1747

Charles Savage was Governor of the Bank of England from 1745 to 1747. He had been Deputy Governor from 1743 to 1745. He replaced William Fawkener as Governor and was succeeded by Benjamin Longuet.

== See also ==
- Chief Cashier of the Bank of England
