= Matthew Clarmont =

Governor of the Bank of England (1704-1772)

- Born: 1704
- Died: 1772 (aged 67–68)
- Occupation: Governor

Matthew Clarmont (born Mathieu Clarmont; c. 1704 – 7 May 1772) was an English banker who served as Governor of the Bank of England from 1766 to 1769. He had been Deputy Governor from 1764 to 1766. He replaced John Weyland as Governor and was succeeded by William Cooper. Clarmont's tenure as Governor occurred during the end of the Bengal bubble (1757–1769).

He was born in Bordeaux, the son of Mathieu and Jeanne Clarmont, and naturalised in 1724 by an Act of Parliament (No. 5, 11 George I). In 1766, he was also director of the French Protestant Hospital in London.

In 1733, Clarmont married Martha (Marthe) Leglize, daughter and co-heir of Gideon Leglize (Gédéon l'Église). They had one daughter Susanne, born in 1736, and one son, Jean, born in May 1737, who died along with Martha in June 1737. He lived at 16, Mincing Lane, London. He died in Bath, Somerset, aged 68.

== See also ==
- Chief Cashier of the Bank of England
