= William Hunt (banker) =

British banker

William Hunt was Governor of the Bank of England from 1749 to 1752. He had been Deputy Governor from 1747 to 1749. He replaced Benjamin Longuet as Governor and was succeeded by Alexander Sheafe.

== See also ==
- Chief Cashier of the Bank of England
