= Richard Ford (Southampton MP) =

English merchant and politician (1614–1678)

Sir Richard Ford
- Born: 1614
- Died: 1678 (aged 63–64)

Sir Richard Ford (c. 1614 – 31 August 1678) was an English merchant and local and national politician.

He was the younger son of merchant Thomas Ford of Exeter, Devon and educated at Exeter College, Oxford and Gray's Inn.

He moved to live in Rotterdam, from where he supplied the Royalist Forces during the English Civil War. He was a member of the Merchant Adventurers by 1644, acting as governor from 1660 to 1675. He returned to England in 1652 and was a Commissioner of the East India Company (1658–1663, 1664–1665) and Deputy Governor of the Royal Adventurers in Africa Company (1663). He was knighted in 1660.

He was elected MP for Southampton in 1661 and proved an active member, serving on many committees. He was made an Alderman in London the same year and a Deputy Lieutenant for London a year later, positions he held until his death. He was elected Sheriff of London from 1663 to 1664, and Lord Mayor of London from 1670 to 1671. He served on a number of public Commissions.

He was elected a Fellow of the Royal Society in 1673.

After his death in 1678, he was buried at Bexley. He had married Grace and had two sons and three daughters.
