= George Peters (banker) =

Governor of the Bank of England (died 1797)

- Died: 1797
- Occupation: Governor

George Peters (died 1797) was Governor of the Bank of England from 1785 to 1787. He had been Deputy Governor from 1783 to 1785. He replaced Richard Neave as Governor and was succeeded by Edward Darell.

== See also ==
- Chief Cashier of the Bank of England
