= Nathaniel Tench =

Nathaniel Tench (died 1710) was Governor of the Bank of England from 1699 to 1701. He had been Deputy Governor from 1697 to 1699. He replaced William Scawen and was succeeded by John Ward.

Tench became a landowner in Leyton. A monument to him was placed on the north wall of St Mary's Church, Leyton. On his estate, his son Sir Fisher Tench, 1st Baronet built a mansion, Leyton Great House, demolished 1905.

== See also ==
- Chief Cashier of the Bank of England

Government offices
Preceded by Sir William Scawen	Governor of the Bank of England; 1699 – 1701	Succeeded by Sir John Ward
