= William Thompson (banker) =

William Thompson was Governor of the Bank of England from 1725 to 1727. He had been Deputy Governor from 1723 to 1725. He replaced Gilbert Heathcote as Governor and was succeeded by Humphry Morice.

== See also ==
- Chief Cashier of the Bank of England

Government offices
Preceded by Sir Gilbert Heathcote	Governor of the Bank of England; 1725 – 1727	Succeeded by Humphry Morice
