= Alexander Sheafe =

Alexander Sheafe was the Governor of the Bank of England from 1752 to 1754. He had been Deputy Governor from 1750 to 1752. He replaced William Hunt as Governor and was succeeded by Charles Palmer.

== See also ==
- Chief Cashier of the Bank of England
