= Governor of the Bank of England =

Senior position in the Bank of England

- Seal of the Bank of England

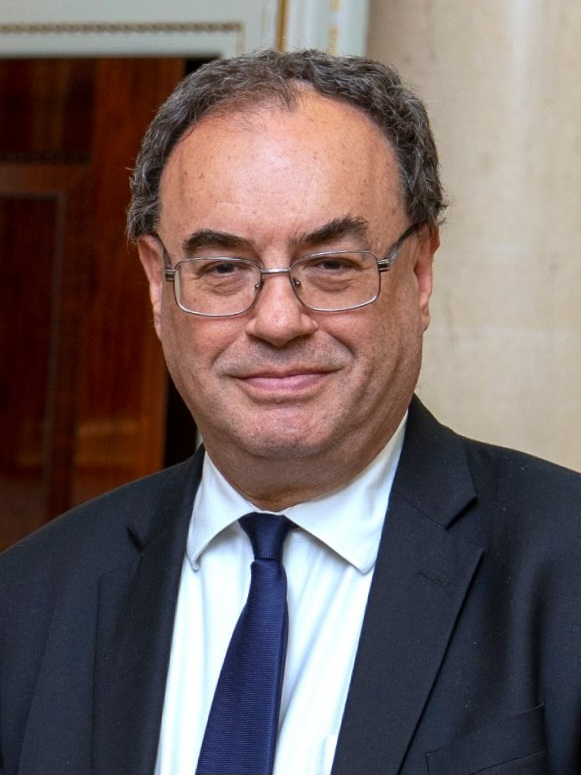
- Incumbent; Andrew Bailey since 16 March 2020
- Monetary Policy Committee; Governor and Company of the Bank of England
- Residence: London, United Kingdom
- Appointer: Chancellor of the Exchequer with the approval of the Prime Minister and the Monarch
- Term length: 8 years (renewable once)
- Inaugural holder: Sir John Houblon
- Formation: 1694
- Salary: £495 000
- Website: Governor of the Bank of England

The governor of the Bank of England is the most senior position in the Bank of England. It is nominally a civil service post, but the appointment tends to be from within the bank, with the incumbent choosing and mentoring a successor. The governor of the Bank of England is also chairman of the Monetary Policy Committee, with a major role in guiding national economic and monetary policy, and is therefore one of the most important public officials in the United Kingdom.

According to the original charter of 27 July 1694 the bank's affairs would be supervised by a governor, a deputy governor, and 24 directors. In its current incarnation, the bank's Court of Directors has 12 (or up to 14) members, of whom five are various designated executives of the bank.

The 121st and current governor is Andrew Bailey, who began his term in March 2020.

== List of Governors of the Bank of England (1694–present) ==
No.	Name	In office	Tenure (years)
1	John Houblon	1694–1697	3
2	William Scawen	1697–1699	2
3	Nathaniel Tench	1699–1701	2
4	John Ward	1701–1703	2
5	Abraham Houblon	1703–1705	2
6	James Bateman	1705–1707	2
7	Francis Eyles	1707–1709	2
8	Gilbert Heathcote	1709–1711	2
9	Nathaniel Gould	1711–1713	2
10	John Rudge	1713–1715	2
11	Peter Delmé	1715–1717	2
12	Gerard Conyers	1717–1719	2
13	John Hanger	1719–1721	2
14	Thomas Scawen	1721–1723	2
15	Gilbert Heathcote	1723–1725	2
16	William Thompson	1725–1727	2
17	Humphry Morice	1727–1729	2
18	Samuel Holden	1729–1731	2
19	Edward Bellamy	1731–1733	2
20	Horatio Townshend	1733–1735	2
21	Bryan Benson	1735–1737	2
22	Thomas Cooke	1737–1740	3
23	Delillers Carbonnel	1740–1741	1
24	Stamp Brooksbank	1741–1743	2
25	William Fawkener	1743–1745	2
26	Charles Savage	1745–1747	2
27	Benjamin Longuet	1747–1749	2
28	William Hunt	1749–1752	3
29	Alexander Sheafe	1752–1754	2
30	Charles Palmer	1754–1756	2
31	Matthews Beachcroft	1756–1758	2
32	Merrik Burrell	1758–1760	2
33	Bartholomew Burton	1760–1762	2
34	Robert Marsh	1762–1764	2
35	John Weyland	1764–1766	2
36	Matthew Clarmont	1766–1769	3
37	William Cooper	1769–1771	2
38	Edward Payne	1771–1773	2
39	James Sperling	1773–1775	2
40	Samuel Beachcroft	1775–1777	2
41	Peter Gaussen	1777–1779	2
42	Daniel Booth	1779–1781	2
43	William Ewer	1781–1783	2
44	Richard Neave	1783–1785	2
45	George Peters	1785–1787	2
46	Edward Darell	1787–1789	2
47	Mark Weyland	1789–1791	2
48	Samuel Bosanquet	1791–1793	2
49	Godfrey Thornton	1793–1795	2
50	Daniel Giles	1795–1797	2
51	Thomas Raikes	1797–1799	2
52	Samuel Thornton	1799–1801	2
53	Job Mathew Raikes	1801–1802	1
54	Joseph Nutt	1802–1804	2
55	Benjamin Winthrop	1804–1806	2
56	Beeston Long	1806–1808	2
57	John Whitmore	1808–1810	2
58	John Pearse	1810–1812	2
59	William Manning	1812–1814	2
60	William Mellish	1814–1816	2
61	Jeremiah Harman	1816–1818	2
62	George Dorrien	1818–1820	2
63	Charles Pole	1820–1822	2
64	John Bowden	1822–1824	2
65	Cornelius Buller	1824–1826	2
66	John Baker Richards	1826–1828	2
67	Samuel Drewe	1828–1830	2
68	John Horsley Palmer	1830–1833	3
69	Richard Mee Raikes	1833–1834	1
70	James Pattison	1834–1837	3
71	Timothy Abraham Curtis	1837–1839	2
72	John Reid	1839–1841	2
73	John Pelly	1841–1842	1
74	William Cotton	1842–1845	3
75	John Benjamin Heath	1845–1847	2
76	William Robinson	April–August 1847	0.3
77	James Morris	1847–1849	2
78	Henry James Prescott	1849–1851	2
79	Thomson Hankey	1851–1853	2
80	John Hubbard	1853–1855	2
81	Thomas Matthias Weguelin	1855–1857	2
82	Sheffield Neave	1857–1859	2
83	Bonamy Dobrée	1859–1861	2
84	Alfred Latham	1861–1863	2
85	Kirkman Hodgson	1863–1865	2
86	Henry Lancelot Holland	1865–1867	2
87	Thomas Newman Hunt	1867–1869	2
88	Robert Wigram Crawford	1869–1871	2
89	George Lyall	1871–1873	2
90	Benjamin Buck Greene	1873–1875	2
91	Hucks Gibbs	1875–1877	2
92	Edward Howley Palmer	1877–1879	2
93	John William Birch	1879–1881	2
94	Henry Grenfell	1881–1883	2
95	John Saunders Gilliat	1883–1885	2
96	James Pattison Currie	1885–1887	2
97	Mark Collet	1887–1889	2
98	William Lidderdale	1889–1892	3
99	David Powell	1892–1895	3
100	Albert George Sandeman	1895–1897	2
101	Hugh Colin Smith	1897–1899	2
102	Samuel Steuart Gladstone	1899–1901	2
103	Augustus Prevost	1901–1903	2
104	Samuel Morley	1903–1905	2
105	Alexander Falconer Wallace	1905–1907	2
106	William Middleton Campbell	1907–1909	2
107	Reginald Eden Johnston	1909–1911	2
108	Alfred Clayton Cole	1911–1913	2
109	Walter Cunliffe	1913–1918	5
110	Brien Cokayne	1918–1920	2
111	Montagu Norman	1920–1944	24
112	Thomas Catto	1944–1949	5
113	Cameron Cobbold	1949–1961	12
114	Rowland Baring	1961–1966	5
115	Leslie O'Brien	1966–1973	7
116	Gordon Richardson	1973–1983	10
117	Robin Leigh-Pemberton	1983–1993	10
118	Edward George	1993–2003	10
119	Mervyn King	2003–2013	10
120	Mark Carney	2013–2020	7
121	Andrew Bailey	2020–present	6

== See also ==
- Chief Cashier of the Bank of England
- Deputy Governor of the Bank of England
