= James Sperling =

Governer of the Bank of England from 1773 to 1775

James Sperling was Governor of the Bank of England from 1773 to 1775. He had been Deputy Governor from 1771 to 1773. He replaced Edward Payne as Governor and was succeeded by Samuel Beachcroft. Sperling's tenure as Governor occurred during the Bengal bubble crash (1769–1784).

== See also ==
- Chief Cashier of the Bank of England
