= Samuel Bosanquet =

English merchant and banker (1744–1806)

- Born: 1744
- Died: 1806 (aged 62)
- Spouse: Eleanor Hunter (m. 1767)
- Children: Charles Bosanquet; John Bernard Bosanquet
- Relatives: Mary Bosanquet Fletcher (sister); Jacob Bosanquet (first cousin); James Whatman Bosanquet (grandson); Bernard Bosanquet (great-great grandson); Reginald Bosanquet (great-great-great grandson)

Samuel Bosanquet (1744–1806) was an English merchant and banker.

== Life ==
Samuel Bosanquet was born into an immigrant family of Huguenots, the son of Samuel Bosanquet (1700–1765) and his wife Mary Dunster. His sister Mary would go on to become one of the first female Methodist preachers.

Bosanquet married Eleanor Hunter in 1767. Charles Bosanquet and John Bernard Bosanquet were their sons.

== Career ==
Bosanquet became a Director of the Bank of England in 1771, was elected Deputy Governor from 1789 to 1791 and Governor from 1791 to 1793. He replaced Mark Weyland as Governor and was succeeded by Godfrey Thornton. Bosanquet's tenure as Governor occurred during the Panic of 1792.

In 1793 Bosanquet resumed his place in the Court of Directors, and remained in this occupation until his death in 1806.

== See also ==
- Chief Cashier of the Bank of England
