= Bartholomew Burton =

British financier, banker and politician

Member of Parliament for Camelford
- In office 1759–1768 Serving with Samuel Martin
- Preceded by: John Lade; Samuel Martin
- Succeeded by: Charles Phillips; William Wilson

Governor of the Bank of England
- In office 1758–1760
- Preceded by: Merrick Burrell
- Succeeded by: Robert Marsh

Personal details
- Born: c. 1695
- Died: May 1770 (aged 74–75)
- Spouse(s): Hester Mansell (m. 1729, died) Philadelphia Herne (m. 1733; died 1762) Elizabeth Marke (m. 1762; died 1762)
- Children: Sarah Burton
- Parent(s): Bartholomew Burton; Susanna Gregory
- Relatives: William Burton (brother); Sir William Rowley, 2nd Baronet (grandson); Bartholomew Rowley (grandson); Sir Charles Rowley, 1st Baronet (grandson)

Bartholomew Burton (c. 1695 – 1770) was a British financier, banker and politician who sat in the House of Commons from 1759 to 1768. He was Governor of the Bank of England from 1760 to 1762.

== Early life ==
Burton, who was born in c. 1695, was the fourth son of Bartholomew Burton of North Luffenham, Rutland, and his second wife Susanna Gregory, daughter of George Gregory. He was the brother of William Burton who was also an MP.

== Career ==
Burton was a director of the Bank of England from 1746 to 1758 when he became Deputy Governor. He was brought into parliament at a time of financial crisis as Member of Parliament for Camelford at a by-election on 25 May 1759. He became Governor of the Bank of England in 1760. Burton's tenure as Governor occurred during the Bengal bubble (1757–1769). At the 1761 general election he was returned unopposed again as MP for Camelford. He decided not to stand at the 1768 general election.

== Personal life ==
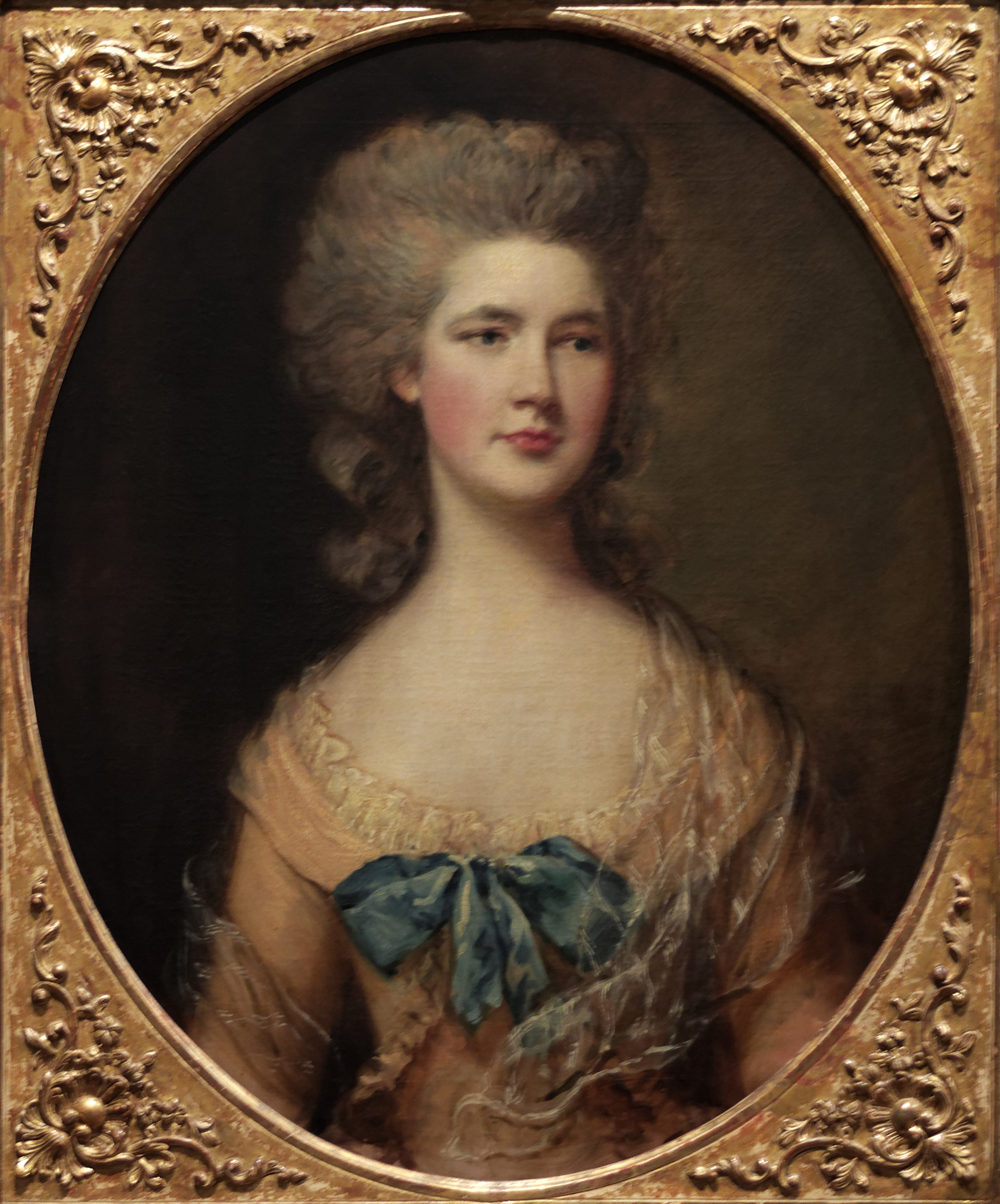
Portrait of his granddaughter, Miss Philadelphia Rowley, by Thomas Gainsborough, c. 1783

Burton was thrice married. His first marriage was on 25 May 1729 to Hester Mansell. After her death, he married secondly on 2 September 1733, Philadelphia Herne, daughter of Nathaniel Herne, MP, and had one daughter. Before her death on 23 April 1762, they were the parents of one daughter:

- Sarah Burton (d. 1812), who married Vice-Adm. Sir Joshua Rowley, 1st Baronet, son of Arabella Dawson and Adm. Sir William Rowley, at St Stephen Coleman Street in 1759.

He married a third time to Elizabeth Marke (d. 1762), daughter of John Marke.

Burton died in May 1770.

=== Descendants ===
Through his daughter Sarah, he was a grandfather of Sir William Rowley, 2nd Baronet (MP for Suffolk), Philadelphia Rowley (wife of Adm. Sir Charles Cotton, 5th Baronet), Adm. Bartholomew Rowley (Commander-in-Chief of the Jamaica Station), the Rev. Joshua Rowley, and Adm. Sir Charles Rowley, 1st Baronet.

== See also ==
- Chief Cashier of the Bank of England

Parliament of Great Britain
Preceded by John Lade; Samuel Martin	Member of Parliament for Camelford; 1759–1768; With: Samuel Martin	Succeeded by Charles Phillips; William Wilson
Government offices
Preceded by Merrick Burrell	Governor of the Bank of England; 1758–1760	Succeeded by Robert Marsh
