= Samuel Beachcroft =

English banker, governor of the Bank of England (died 1796)

- Died: 30 April 1796
- Occupation(s): banker, governor of the Bank of England from 1775 to 1777

Samuel Beachcroft (died 30 April 1796) was an English banker, governor of the Bank of England from 1775 to 1777. He had been Deputy Governor from 1773 to 1775. He replaced James Sperling as Governor and was succeeded by Peter Gaussen. Beachcroft's tenure as Governor occurred during the Bengal bubble crash (1769–1784).

== See also ==
- Chief Cashier of the Bank of England
