= William Middleton Campbell =

William Middleton Campbell (1849–1919) was Governor of the Bank of England from 1907 to 1909.

== Early life ==
William Middleton Campbell was born in 1849. He was the son of Colin Campbell (Junior) of Colgrain and Camis Eskan (1818–86), a wealthy sugar merchant who owned plantations in British Guiana. He was educated at Eton College.

== Career ==
Campbell was a director of the Bank of England from 1886 and Governor from 1907 to 1909, having served as the Deputy Governor from 1905 to 1907.

== Personal life ==
He married Edith Agneta Bevan (1850–1929), the daughter of the banker Robert Cooper Lee Bevan (1809–1890). Their son Norman Robert Campbell (1880–1949) was a physicist and philosopher of science.

== Death ==
He died in 1919.

Government offices
Preceded by Alexander Falconer Wallace	Governor of the Bank of England; 1907–1909	Succeeded by Reginald Eden Johnston
