= Benjamin Buck Greene =

British banker (1808–1902)

Benjamin Buck Greene (1808 – 3 April 1902) was a British banker, plater, and financier. He inherited a large fortune derived from the Atlantic slave trade and the sugar industry in the Caribbean, later becoming one of London's leading merchants and shipowners. He served as a director of the Bank of England for fifty years from 1850, also serving as deputy governor (1871-3) and governor (1873–5).

== Career ==
Born the son of Benjamin Greene, of Bury St Edmunds, a slave owner and in the 1790s founder of what became the Greene King brewery, one of the largest brewing businesses in England. Greene was educated at King Edward VI School.

In 1829 Greene went to Saint Kitts to look after his father's cotton and sugar plantations (acquired in 1823), which were worked by slaves and were highly profitable. The family also owned ships carrying sugar exports. Greene remained in St Kitts until 1837. The Greenes acquired several sugar plantations in the Caribbean, in St Kitts, Montserrat and Antigua, which they either owned or managed. They eventually run 18 estates.

Benjamin senior established with his son Benjamin Greene & Son, West India merchants and shipowners, at 11 Mincing Lane. Through his wife's family connections, Greene formed a partnership with James and Henry Blyth, who controlled much of the external trade and sugar production of Mauritius, in 1846. Blyths and Greene, merchants and shipowners, became one of London's largest colonial merchants and shipowners. Importing sugar from Mauritius, the East and West Indies, India and France; exporting British manufactures to Mauritius. He converted Spooner's Estate on Saint Kitts to steam-powered milling in the 1870s.

Benjamin Buck Greene purchased Midgham House in Berkshire in 1856. He was High Sheriff of Berkshire in 1865.

Elected a Bank of England director from 1850 to 1900, he became Deputy Governor in 1871 and went on to become Governor in 1873. Greene's tenure as Governor occurred during the Panic of 1873. He died at his home in Berkshire on 3 April 1902.

When the ownership of slaves was finally abolished in the British Empire in 1833, the government paid compensation for slavery - not to the enslaved people, but to the slaveholders. The government paid £20m, 40% of the HM Treasury's annual spending budget (£17 billion in today's terms) in compensation. This vast sum of borrowed money was only finally repaid in 2015. In June 2020, during the global protests following the murder of George Floyd, the Bank of England issued a public apology for the involvement of Greene, amongst of some of its past governors and directors in the slave trade.

== Family ==
In 1837 Greene married Isabella Elizabeth Blyth, daughter of Thomas Blyth, a wealthy ship merchant and slave owner. She died in 1888. They had three sons and three daughters. His son Henry David Greene became a barrister and Conservative MP. One of his brothers, Edward, was Conservative MP for Bury St Edmunds (1865-1885) and Stowmarket (1886–91).

Like the Darwins or the Huxleys, the Greenes made a prominent dynasty in England: Sir Hugh Greene, was Director-General of the BBC, Raymond Greene, joined the Everest expedition as senior doctor and chief intellect, Graham Greene was a major 20th-century novelist involved in espionage and British intelligence from the 1920s until the late-1980s, Elisabeth Greene, worked for Secret Intelligence Service (SIS/MI6), and Sir William Graham Greene, was one of the founders of the Naval Intelligence in the First World War and still involved in Intelligence in the Second World War.

== Bibliography ==
- Jeremy Lewis: Shades of Greene. One generation of an English family. London: Jonathan Cape, 2010
