= William Fawkener (banker) =

William Fawkener was Governor of the Bank of England from 1743 to 1745, having previously served as the Bank's Deputy Governor. He was son of another William Fawkener (1642–1716), a leading member of the Levant Company, and brother of Sir Everard Fawkener, who was also a merchant dealing in silk, before becoming Ambassador to the Sublime Porte between 1737 and 1744.

Government offices
Preceded by Stamp Brooksbank	Governor of the Bank of England; 1743 - 1745	Succeeded by Charles Savage
