= Job Mathew Raikes =

British merchant and banker (1767–1833)

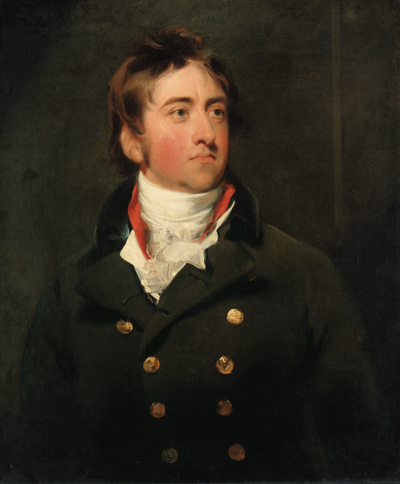
- Born: 1767
- Died: 1833 (aged 65–66); France
- Occupation: Musicologist
- Spouse: Charlotte Bayly

Job Mathew Raikes (1767–1833) was a British merchant and banker born in Essex England.

Raikes married Charlotte Bayly, daughter of Nathaniel Bayly, MP, and colonial plantation owner in Jamaica. Charles Raikes (1812–1885), East India Company servant and writer on India, was their son.
