= Centre for the Study of the Legacies of British Slavery =

Research centre at University College, London

Coordinates: 51.52197°N 0.13452°W

- Type: Research institute
- Established: 2010; 16 years ago
- Director: Matthew J. Smith
- Location: London, United Kingdom
- Website: www.ucl.ac.uk/lbs/

The Centre for the Study of the Legacies of British Slavery, formerly the Centre for the Study of the Legacies of British Slave-ownership, is a research centre of University College London (UCL) that focuses on revealing the impact of British slavery and, in particular, the implications of the Slave Compensation Act 1837. The centre's work is freely available online to the public through the Legacies of British Slavery database.

== History ==
The Centre was established at UCL with the support of the Hutchins Center for African and African American Research at Harvard University.

It incorporates two earlier projects: the Legacies of British Slave-ownership project (2009–2012), funded by the Economic and Social Research Council (ESRC) and the Structure and significance of British Caribbean slave-ownership 1763–1833 project (2013–2015), funded by the ESRC and the Arts and Humanities Research Council. The first project started with the slave compensation data, identifying slave-owners and the estates on which enslaved people lived. (As land owners in the British West Indies were losing their unpaid labourers, they received compensation totalling £20 million.)

The second project charted the ownership histories of approximately 4,000 estates, going back to around 1763 but focusing primarily on the years of the slave registers, 1817–1834. The second phase added another 4,000 estates, and another 20,000 slave-owners. The current project continues to add information and build the database created in the second phase, aiming to identify all slave-owners in the British colonies at the time slavery ended (1807–1833), creating the Encyclopedia of British Slave-Owners, as well as all of the estates in the British West Indies. During early 2021, the Centre announced a shift in emphasis towards researching the lives of the enslaved rather than slave-owners.

== Staff ==
The centre's inaugural director was Nicholas Draper and its chair Catherine Hall. In June 2020 Matthew J. Smith, formerly of the University of the West Indies, took over the directorship. Other key researchers include Keith McClelland and Rachel Lang.

== Database ==
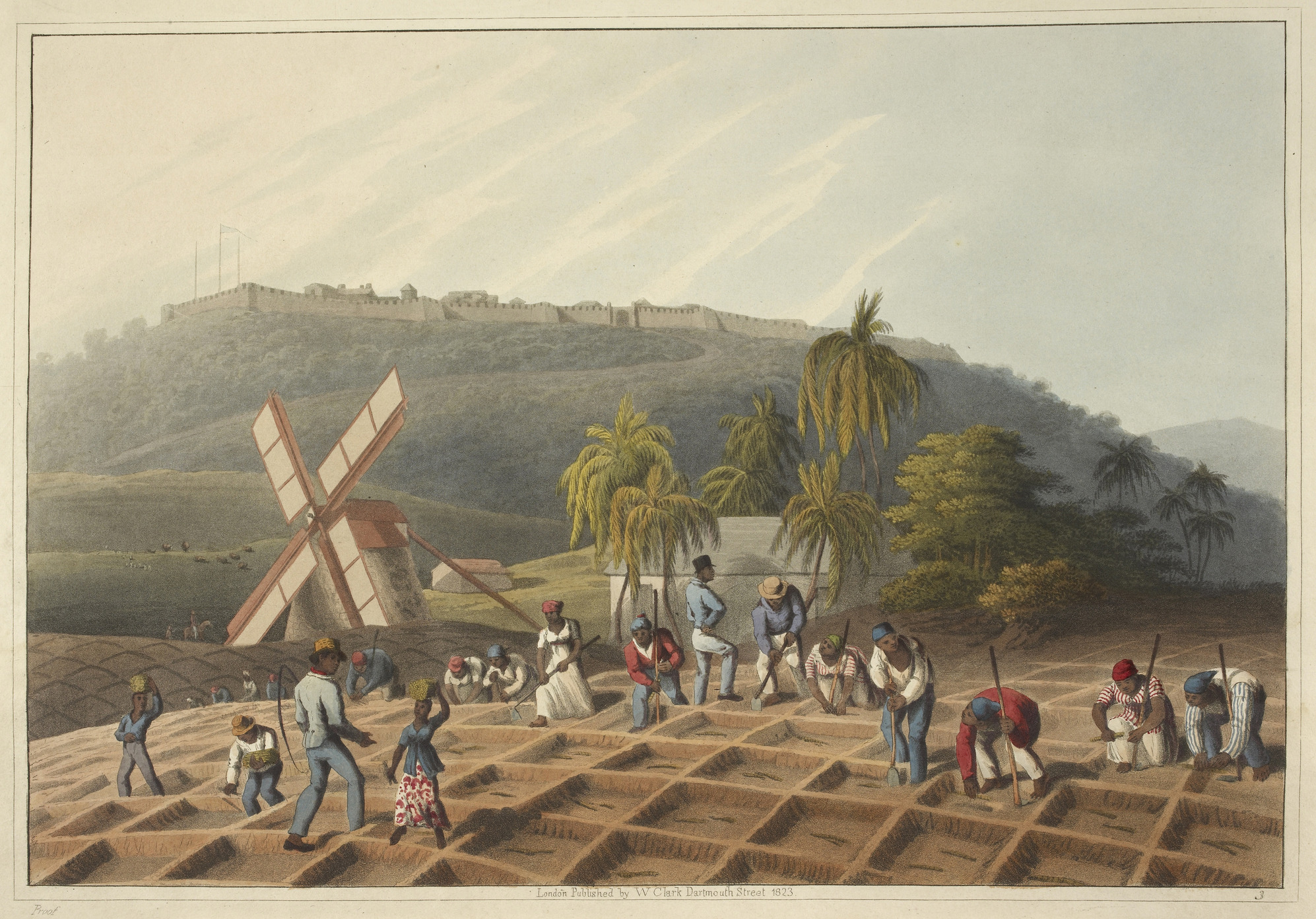
Slaves working on Bodkin's Estate in Antigua (1823)

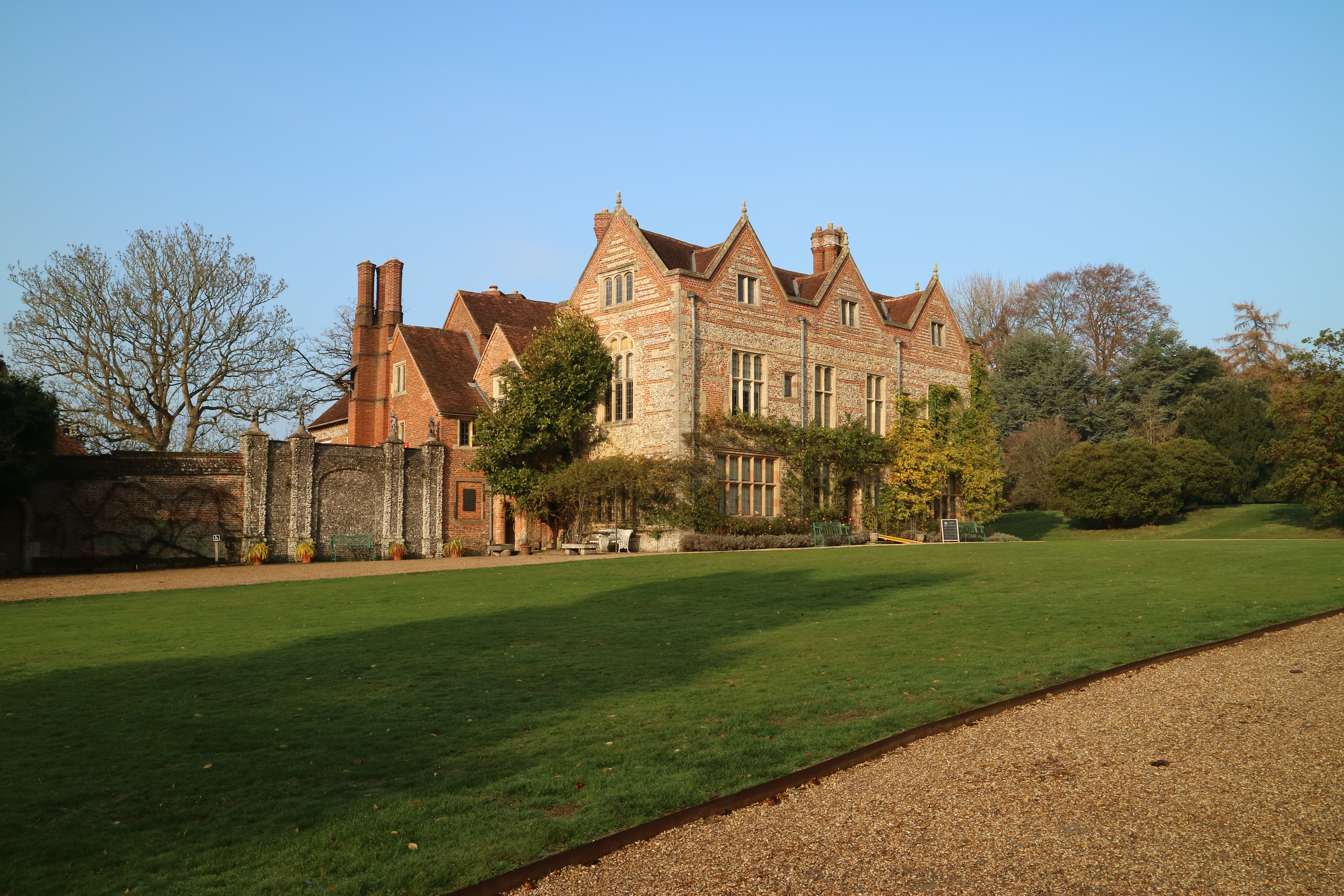
Greys Court House, whose owners benefitted from slave compensation from Antigua

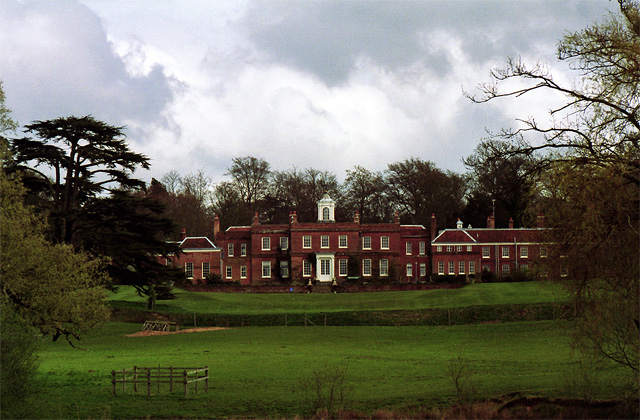
Farley Hall, whose owners benefitted from slave compensation from Antigua

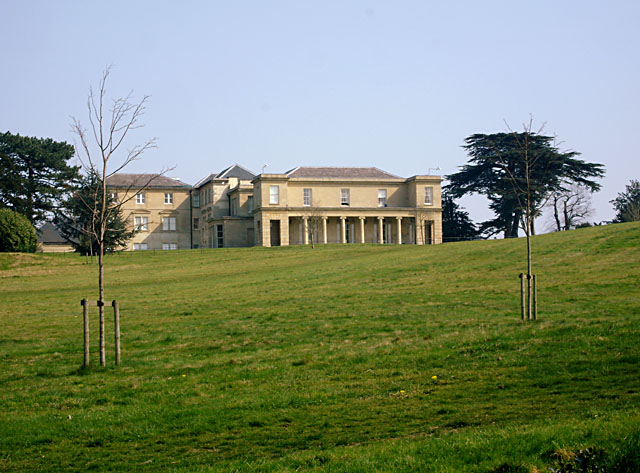
Brentry House, whose owners benefitted from slave compensation from Antigua

The centre's work is freely available online to the public through the Legacies of British Slavery database. This database aims to record all those individuals who were recompensed by the British state at the abolition of slavery in 1833. (Although the Atlantic slave trade had been abolished in 1807, it took another generation for the British government to manumit the enslaved people within its Empire, and even then it did not tackle slavery in India till 1843.) This flow of money was, as the original title of the project indicated, to the slave owners, and not to the newly freed individuals: the liberation of the slaves was treated legally as the expropriation of their masters. A very large sum was paid by the British state to thousands of its subjects; most of the erstwhile owners received compensation for only one or a handful of slaves, but a small number of families owned large plantations with hundreds or even thousands of enslaved workers, and so received substantial amounts of money.

Inaugural director Nick Draper and chair Catherine Hall have said that the central purpose of the Legacies database is to counter "selective forgetting", whereby society forgets the human cost of slavery but celebrates its abolition. The project builds on a wider re-examination of Britain's links to slavery and its abolition, some of which was stimulated by the 2007 bicentenary of the Slave Trade Act 1807. For example, English Heritage held a conference on "Slavery and the British Country House: mapping the current research" in 2009. The papers were compiled into a book of the same title, with an opening chapter to set the scene by Nicholas Draper describing the legacies project, then in embryo. Madge Dresser's introduction acknowledges that "Academic research takes time to feed through into the public domain, where such links [to slavery] had so often been either studiously ignored or actively repressed." Compensation money was received by the owners of "well-known sites of slave ownership such as Dodington Park... the National Trust's property at Greys' Court... and Brentry House in Gloucestershire", not far from the slave port of Bristol.

The research upon which the Legacies database is based revealed that some 46,000 people received compensation under the Slave Compensation Act 1837. The Slave Compensation Commission established a sum equivalent in today's money to about 17 billion pounds, the largest payout until the bailout of the banks in 2008.

As Hall has stated, beneficiaries of slavery were not only people who owned slaves, but also those whose business dealings derived benefit from slavery. This included merchants who were involved in industries such as sugar processing and textile manufacturing.

One of the purposes of the legacies project is to research how the families spent their compensation. Some of the money went to pay for the education of sons and grandsons (including grand tours of Europe) and to consolidate their professional and political power:

The man who received the most money from the state was John Gladstone, the father of Victorian prime minister William Ewart Gladstone. He was paid £106,769 in compensation for the 2,508 slaves he owned across nine plantations, the modern equivalent of about £80m. Given such an investment, it is perhaps not surprising that William Gladstone's maiden speech in parliament was in defence of slavery.

Money was also invested in the Railway Mania of the 1840s (the mania tipped the transportation balance away from the Golden Age of the British canal system) and in the factory system. "As well as paying for the building of dozens of country houses and art collections, the money also helped fund railways, museums, insurance companies, mining firms, merchants and banks."

=== United Kingdom ===
Guy Hewitt, High Commissioner of Barbados, compared the project to the Trans-Atlantic Slave Trade Database, run by the Emory Center for Digital Scholarship

A two-part television programme, Britain's Forgotten Slave-owners, was broadcast by the BBC to accompany the public launch of the project. It was presented by the historian David Olusoga and won a BAFTA award and the Royal Historical Society Public History Prize for Broadcasting.

Organisations that existed at the time of slavery have begun to examine their histories and search for any connections. For example, the University of Glasgow launched an inquiry to understand the impact of slavery on the institution.

Similarly, in 2020, the Scott Trust, owner of The Guardian newspaper, commissioned research into its founders' links to the transatlantic slave trade, which led to the establishment of a restorative justice program that is ongoing.

In 2023, the Trevelyan family, whose ancestor Sir John Trevelyan, 4th Baronet was compensated for ownership of slaves in Grenada, issued a formal apology and launched the Trevelyan Family Reparations Fund to support education projects in the country.

A number of businesses still in existence have been shown to have benefited from slavery: "Among the names the UCL project has turned up are the Bank of England, Lloyds, Baring Brothers and P&O."

=== Australia ===
The centre's work has been considered by scholars, including Catherine Hall, Humphrey McQueen, Clinton Fernandes and C. J. Coventry, in relation to Australian colonial history. The Legacies database revealed numerous connections to slavery that had previously been overlooked or unknown. For example, the colony (now state) of South Australia may owe its existence to slavery finance, through George Fife Angas and Raikes Currie, who gave large sums of money without which the colony would not have been created in 1836. This body of research generated media attention. Another Australian state, Victoria, has been shown to have had many former slaveholders and beneficiaries of slavery in its history, a number of whom are recognised in public honours, including place-names and statuary.

The Australian Dictionary of Biography (ADB) has been criticised for its failure to mention connections to slavery in the biographical entries of notable Australians. However, the ADB was as of 2019 undergoing a review that aims to address this and other deficiencies.

=== United States ===
Actor Ben Affleck apologised after WikiLeaks revealed that he had attempted to stop a genealogy television show revealing his ancestral connection to slavery, which had arisen as a result of the Legacies database.

== See also ==
- Register of British Slave-Traders
- Biography and the Black Atlantic
- List of slave owners
- Reparations for slavery
