= Bank of England =

Central bank of the United Kingdom

Governor and Company of the Bank of England
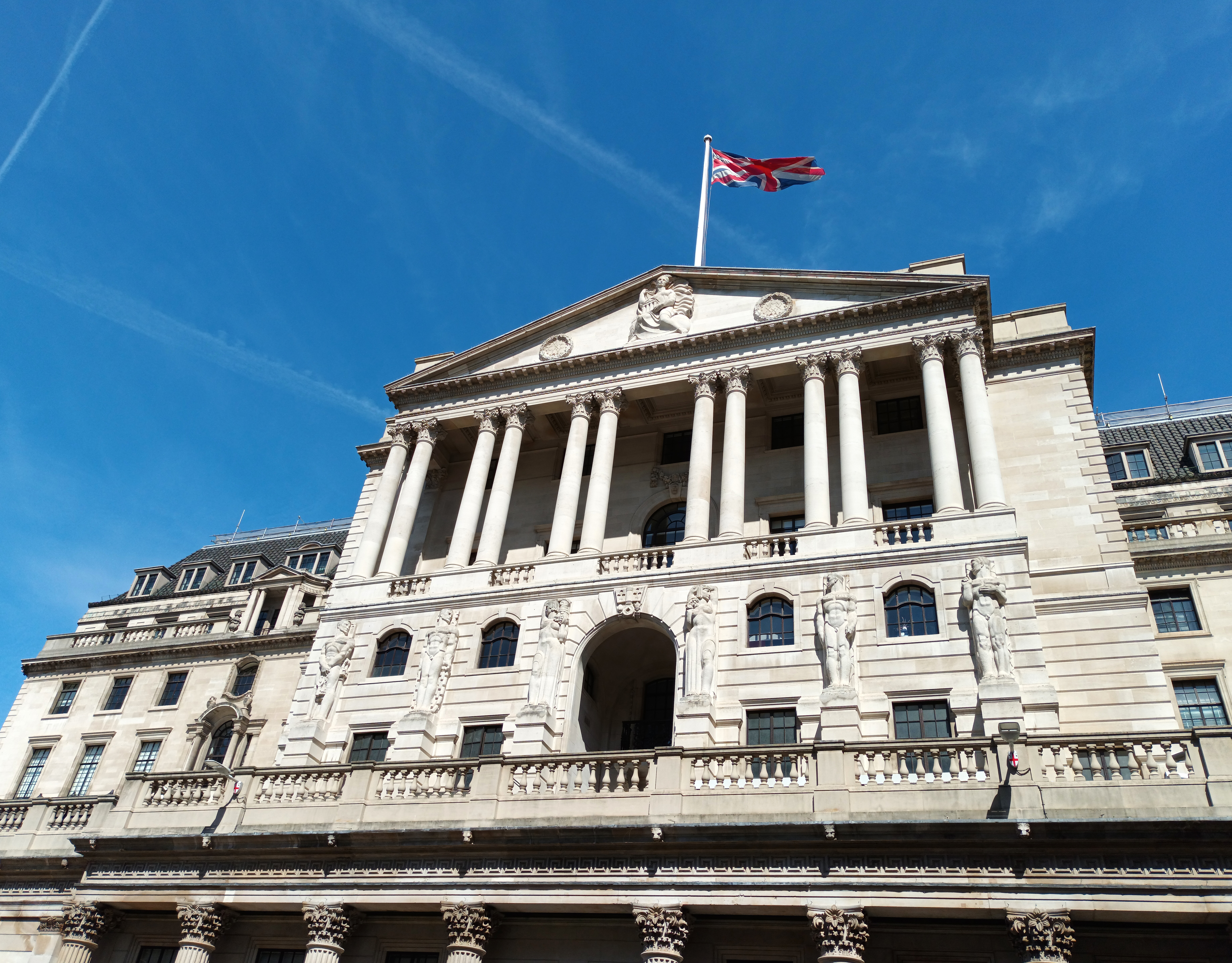
- Seal of the Bank of England The Bank of England building
- Central bank of: United Kingdom
- Headquarters: Threadneedle Street, London, England
- Coordinates: 51°30′50″N 0°5′18″W
- Established: 27 July 1694; 332 years ago
- Governor: Andrew Bailey (since 2020)
- Currency: Pound sterling GBP (ISO 4217)
- Reserves: £78.94B; US$101.59B; €89.93B (2017)
- Bank rate: 3.75%
- Website: bankofengland.co.uk

The Bank of England (BoE) is the central bank of the United Kingdom and the model on which most modern central banks have been based. Established in 1694 to act as the English Government's banker and debt manager, and still one of the bankers for the government of the United Kingdom, it is the world's second oldest central bank, after Sweden's (1668). It is considered to be one of the world's "Big Four" central banks.

The bank was privately owned by stockholders from its chartering in 1694 until its nationalisation in 1946 by the Attlee ministry. In 1998 it became an independent public organisation, wholly owned by the Treasury Solicitor on behalf of the government, with a mandate to support the economic policies of the government of the day, but independence in maintaining price stability. In the 21st century the bank took on increased responsibility for maintaining and monitoring financial stability in the UK, and it increasingly functions as a statutory regulator.

The bank's headquarters have been in London's main financial district, the City of London, since 1694, and on Threadneedle Street since 1734. It is sometimes known as "The Old Lady of Threadneedle Street", a name taken from a satirical cartoon by James Gillray in 1797. The road junction outside is known as Bank Junction. The bank is custodian to the official gold reserves of the United Kingdom.

== Functions ==
According to its strapline, the bank's core purpose is 'promoting the good of the people of the United Kingdom by maintaining monetary and financial stability'. This is achieved in a variety of ways:

=== Monetary stability ===
Stable prices and secure forms of payment are the two main criteria for monetary stability.

==== Stable prices ====
Stable prices are maintained by seeking to ensure that price increases meet the Government's inflation target. The bank aims to meet this target by adjusting the base interest rate (known as the bank rate), which is decided by the bank's Monetary Policy Committee (MPC). (The MPC has devolved responsibility for managing monetary policy; HM Treasury has reserve powers to give orders to the committee "if they are required in the public interest and by extreme economic circumstances", but Parliament must endorse such orders within 28 days.)

As of 2024 the inflation target is 2%; if this target is missed the Governor is required to write an open letter to the Chancellor of the Exchequer explaining the situation and proposing remedies. Other than setting the base interest rate, the main tool at the bank's disposal in this regard is quantitative easing.

==== Secure forms of payment ====
The bank has a monopoly on the issue of banknotes in England and Wales and regulates the issuance of banknotes by commercial banks in Scotland and Northern Ireland. Scottish and Northern Irish banks retain the right to issue their own banknotes, but they must be backed one-for-one with deposits at the bank, excepting a few million pounds representing the value of notes they had in circulation in 1845.

In addition the bank supervises other payment systems, acting as a settlement agent and operating Real-time gross settlement systems including CHAPS. In 2024 the bank was settling around £500 billion worth of payments between banks each day.

=== Financial stability ===
Maintaining financial stability involves protecting the UK's savers, investors and borrowers against threats to the financial system as a whole. Threats are detected by the bank's surveillance and market intelligence functions, and dealt with through financial and other operations (both at home and abroad). The majority of these safeguards were put in place in after the 2008 financial crisis:

==== Regulation ====
In 2011 the bank's Prudential Regulation Authority was established to regulate and supervise all major banks, building societies, credit unions, insurers and investment firms in the UK ('microprudential regulation'). The bank also has a statutory supervisory role in relation to financial market infrastructures.

==== Risk management ====
At the same time, the bank's Financial Policy Committee (FPC) was set up to identify and monitor risks in the financial system, and to take appropriate action where necessary ('macroprudential regulation'). The FPC publishes its findings (and actions taken) in a biannual Financial Stability Report.

==== Banking services ====
The bank provides wholesale banking services to the UK Government (and to over a hundred overseas central banks). It manages the UK's Exchange Equalisation Account on behalf of HM Treasury and it maintains the government's Consolidated Fund account. It also manages the country's foreign exchange reserves and is custodian of the UK's (and others') gold reserves.

The bank also offers 'liquidity support and other services to banks and other financial institutions'. Commercial banks customarily keep a sizeable proportion of their cash reserves on deposit at the Bank of England. These central bank reserves are used by the banks to settle payments with one another; (for this reason the Bank of England is sometimes called 'the bankers' bank'). In exceptional circumstances, the Bank may act as the lender of last resort by extending credit when no other institution will.

As a regulator and central bank, the Bank of England has not offered consumer banking services for many years, but it still does manage some public-facing services (such as exchanging superseded bank notes). Until 2017, Bank staff were entitled to open current accounts directly with the Bank of England and were given the unique sort code of 10–00–00.

==== Resolution ====
Under the terms of the Banking Act 2009 the bank is the UK's Resolution Authority for any bank or building society judged 'too big to fail'; as such it is empowered to act in the event of a bank failure 'to protect the UK's vital financial services and financial stability'.

=== Historic services and responsibilities ===
Between 1715 and 1998, the Bank of England managed Government Stocks (which formed the bulk of the national debt): the bank was responsible for issuing stocks to stockholders, paying dividends and maintaining a register of transfers; however in 1998, following the decision to grant the bank operational independence, responsibility for government debt management was transferred to a new Debt Management Office, which also took over Exchequer cash management and responsibility for issuing Treasury bills from the bank in 2000. Computershare took over as the registrar for UK Government bonds (gilt-edged securities or 'gilts') from the bank at the end of 2004. The bank, however, continues to act as settlement agent for the Debt Management Office and custodian of its securities.

Ever since its foundation in 1694, the bank had provided a retail banking service for the Government; however in 2008 it decided to withdraw from offering these services, which are now provided by a range of other financial institutions and managed by the Government Banking Service.

Until 2016, the bank provided personal banking services as a privilege for employees. Previously, the bank had maintained private and commercial accounts for all sorts of customers, including individuals, small businesses and public organisations; but a change of policy following the First World War saw the bank increasingly withdraw from this type of business to focus more clearly on its central banking role.

== History ==
=== Founding ===
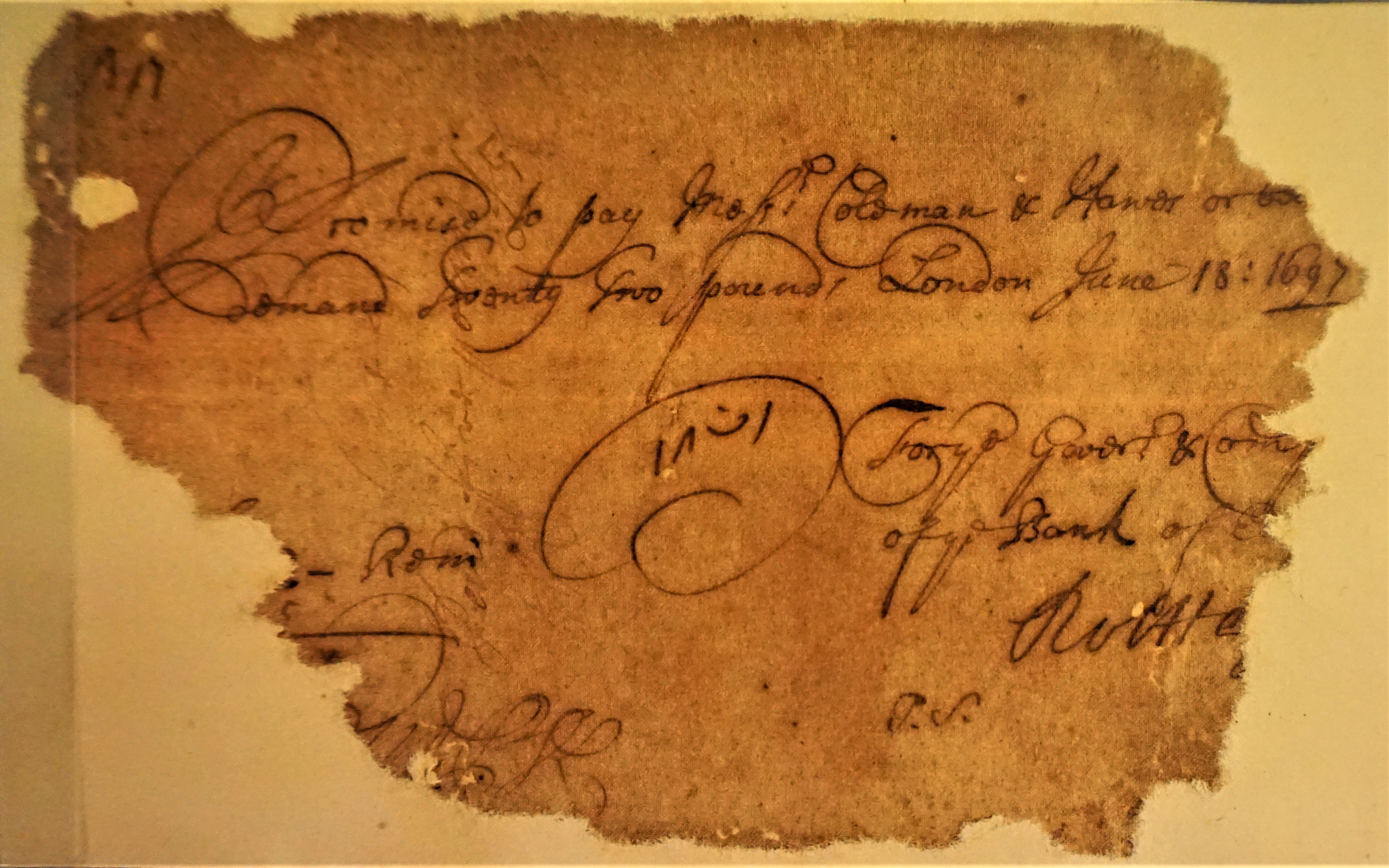
Handwritten banknote dated 1697, signed 'for the Governor and Company of the Bank of England' by 2nd Cashier Robert Hedges

Following the Revolution of 1688, which brought William III and Mary II jointly to the British throne, the establishment of a national bank came to fruition. During the Nine Years' War (1688–1697), the Royal Navy was defeated by the French Navy in the 1690 Battle of Beachy Head, causing consternation in the government of William III of England. The English government decided to rebuild the Royal Navy into a force that was capable of challenging the French on equal terms; however, their ability to do so was hampered both by a lack of available public funds and the government's low credit. This lack of credit made it impossible for the English government to borrow the £1.5m that it wanted to use to expand the Royal Navy.

==== Concept ====
The idea of a public bank antedated its establishment by two decades. It was a topic of discussion and dispute in the 1670s and 1680s. John Locke was an early supporter of the concept, and, once it was established, an early investor. In 1691, Scottish trader and banker William Paterson had proposed establishing a national bank as a means of bolstering public finances. As he later wrote in his pamphlet A Brief Account of the Intended Bank of England (1694):

"...it was proposed some years ago that a publick transferrable Fund of Interest should be established by Parliament, and made convenient for the Receipts and Payments in and about the Cities of London and Westminster; and to constitute a Society of Money'd Men for the government thereof, who should be induced by their Interest to exchange for Money the Assignments upon the Fund, at every demand".

While his scheme was not immediately acted upon, it did provide the basis for the bank's first Charter and the legislation which made its establishment possible.

Two other key figures in the bank's creation were Charles Montagu, the Member of Parliament for Maldon, who played a crucial role in steering the proposals through Parliament (and was afterwards appointed Chancellor of the Exchequer); and Michael Godfrey, who helped persuade City financiers of its benefits (and was subsequently chosen to be the bank's first Deputy Governor).

It has also been claimed (by W. R. Scott, among others) that William Phips played a timely, if incidental, role: his successful expedition to retrieve booty from a sunken Spanish galleon (the Nuestra Señora de la Concepción) helped create an ideal market for the bank's foundation: flooding the market with bullion and creating an enthusiasm for joint-stock ventures.

==== Legislation ====
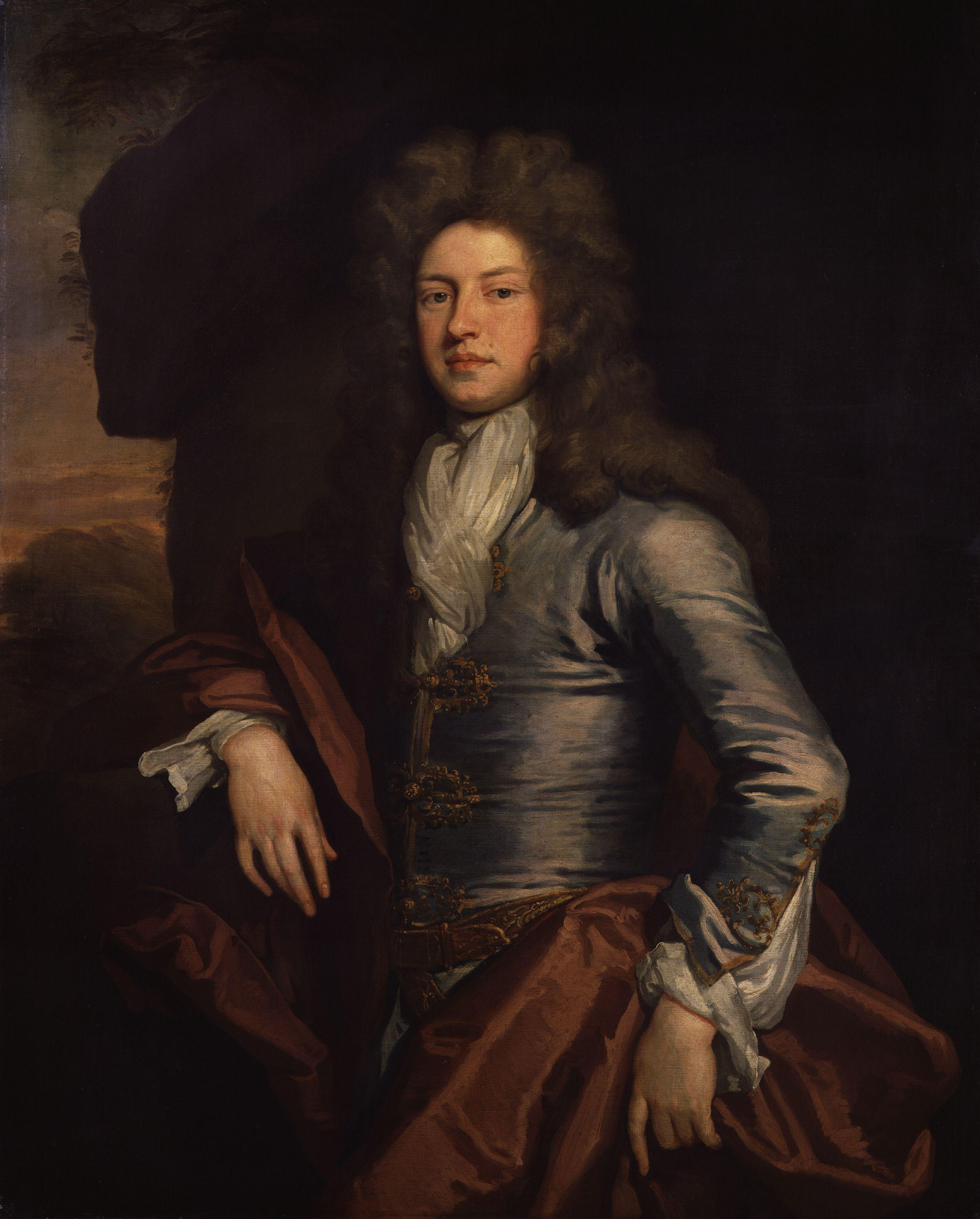
Charles Montagu played a key role in devising the legislation for establishing the Bank and steering it through the House of Commons.

Paterson's proposal required the Government to set up a fund from which interest would be paid to the subscribers. It was decided that this would be provided for by income from tonnage, and certain other shipping duties routinely levied by HM Exchequer; therefore Parliament approved the bank's establishment by means of the Tonnage Act 1694:

An Act for granting to theire Majesties severall Rates and Duties upon Tunnage of Shipps and Vessells and upon Beere Ale and other Liquors for secureing certaine Recompenses and Advantages in the said Act mentioned to such Persons as shall voluntarily advance the summe of Fifteen hundred thousand Pounds towards the carrying on the Warr against France.

To induce subscription to the loan, the subscribers were to be incorporated by the name of the Governor and Company of the Bank of England. Public finances were in such dire condition at the time that the terms of the loan (as laid down in the Act of Parliament) were that it was to be serviced at a rate of 8% per annum; there was also a service charge of £4,000 per annum payable to the bank for the management of the loan.

The Act limited the subscribers' investment to a maximum of £10,000 each in the first instance, and £1,200,000 in total (it was envisaged that the Exchequer would raise the remaining £300,000 through other forms of borrowing).

==== Incorporation ====
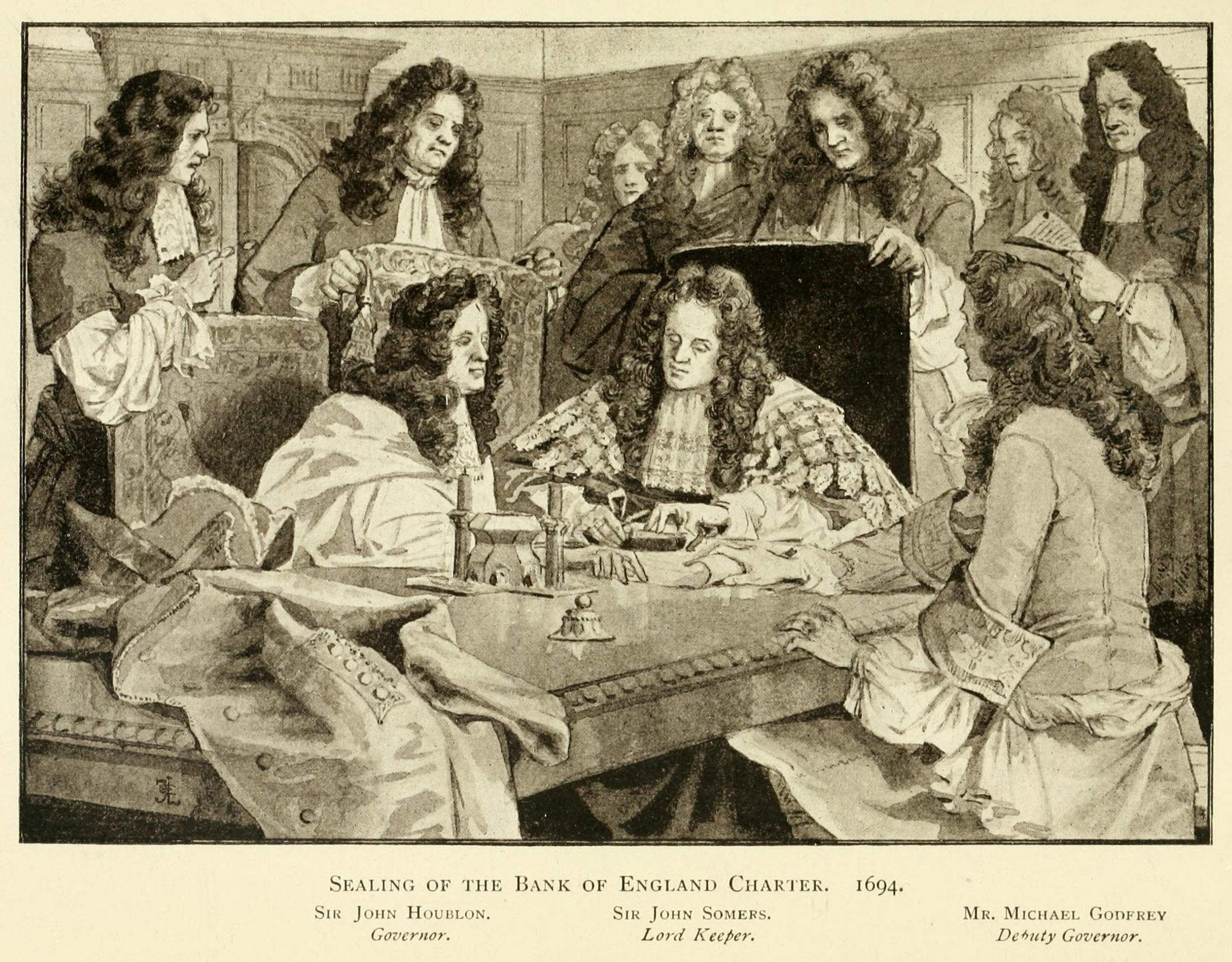
Sealing of the Bank of England Charter (1694), by Lady Jane Lindsay, 1905

The royal charter of the Bank of England was granted on 27 July 1694, three months after the passing of the Act.

In the end the £1.2 million was raised in 12 days; 1,268 people subscribed. Their holdings were known as Bank Stock (Bank Stock continued to be held in private ownership until 1946 when the Bank of England was nationalised). The majority of the original subscribers were of 'the mercantile middle classes of London' (though tradesmen and artisans also subscribed). Most (more than two-thirds) contributed less than £1,000. As a proportion of the total amount raised, 25% came from 'esquires', 21% from merchants and 15% from titled aristocrats. Twelve per cent of the original subscribers were women. King William and Queen Mary (jointly) invested £10,000, the maximum permitted sum, as did a handful of others, including Sir John Houblon.

Investment in the navy duly took place. As a side effect, the huge industrial effort needed (including establishing ironworks to make more nails and advances in agriculture feeding the quadrupled strength of the navy) started to transform the economy. This helped the new Kingdom of Great Britain – England and Scotland were formally united in 1707 – to become powerful. The power of the Royal Navy made Britain the dominant world power in the late 18th and early 19th centuries.

==== Governance ====
The first Governor of the bank was John Houblon, and the first Deputy Governor Michael Godfrey. (330 years later, in 1994, the bank would issue a £50 note depicting Houblon to mark its tercentenary.)

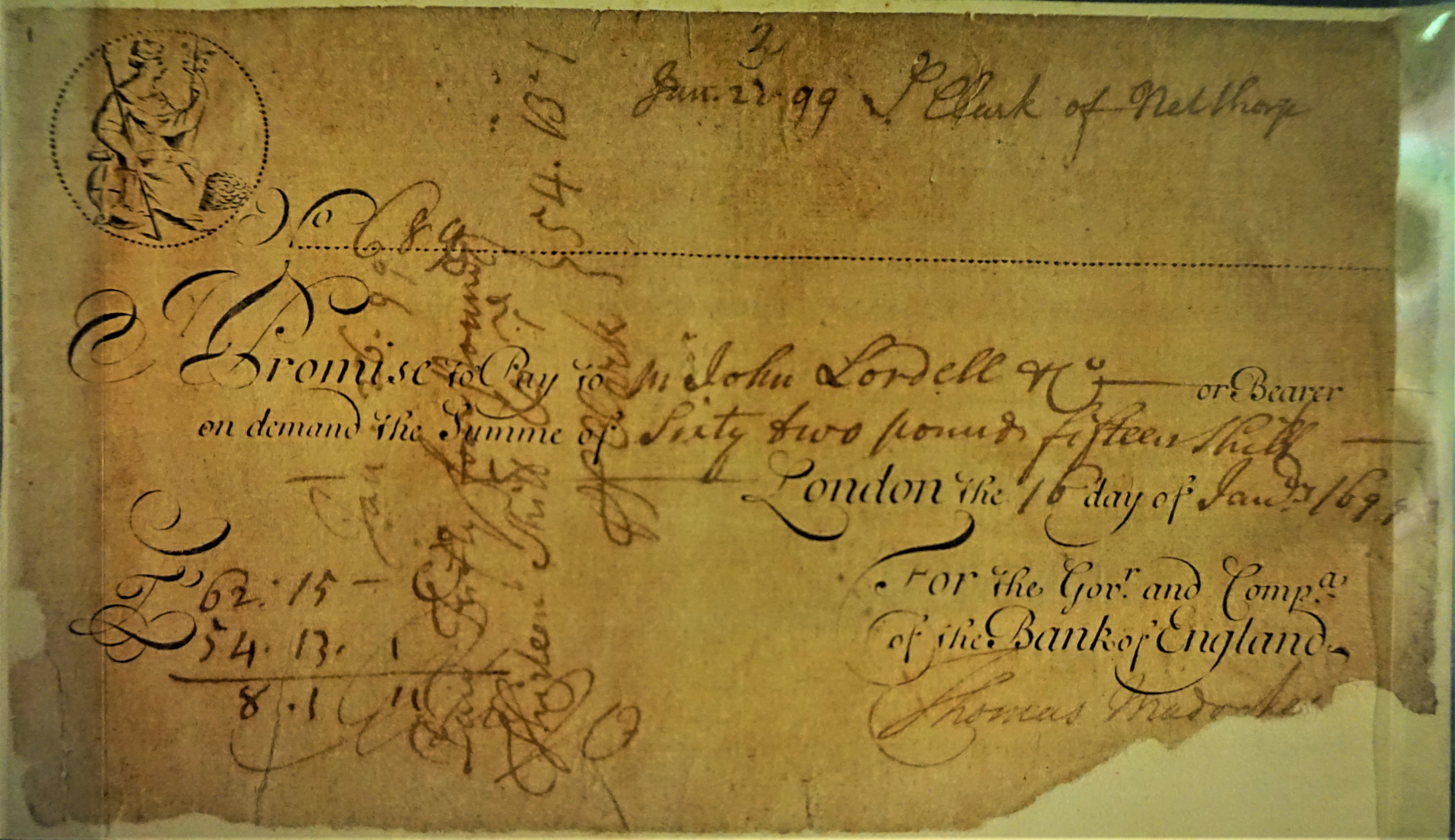
An early Bank of England note, with Britannia emblem, signed by the Chief Cashier, Thomas Madockes, and dated 1699

Governance was vested in the Governor, his Deputy and a 'Court' of 24 Directors (most of whom were merchant bankers recruited from the city); the Directors were elected annually by a 'General Court' of all the Bank's registered stockholders (collectively known as 'the Proprietors'). The common seal of the Court of Directors, adopted on 30 July 1694, depicted 'Britannia sitting and looking on a Bank of mony'; Britannia has been the bank's emblem ever since.

The Court appointed three senior officers who, alongside the Governor and Deputy Governor, were responsible for its day-to-day running of the bank: the Secretary and Solicitor, the First Accomptant, and the First Cashier. Their successors, the Secretary, Chief Accountant, and Chief Cashier, continued to head up the main divisions of the bank's operations for the next 250 years: the Chief Cashier and the Chief Accountant had oversight of the 'cash side' and the 'stock side' of the bank, respectively, while the Secretary oversaw its internal administration.

Besides these officers, the bank in 1694 was staffed by seventeen clerks and two doorkeepers.

==== Premises ====
The bank initially did not have its own building, first opening on 1 August 1694 in Mercers' Hall on Cheapside. This however was found to be too small and from 31 December 1694 the bank operated from Grocers' Hall (located then on Poultry), where it would remain for almost 40 years. (Houblon had served as Master of the Grocers' Company in 1690–1691.)

==== Operation ====
The Act of Parliament prohibited the bank from trading in goods or merchandise of any kind, though it was allowed to deal in gold and silver bullion, and in bills of exchange. Before very long, the bank was maximising its profits by issuing banknotes, taking deposits and lending on mortgages.

In its early days the bank made significant losses, not least by accepting clipped coins in exchange for its banknotes. The establishment of a Land Bank (by John Asgill and Nicholas Barbon) in 1695, and a currency shortage occasioned by the Great Recoinage of 1696, both threatened the bank's position; but Parliament intervened, passing another Act that year, which authorised the bank to increase its capital to over £2.2 million (equivalent to £359.11 million in 2025) through the enlarging of its stock by new subscriptions.

=== 18th century ===
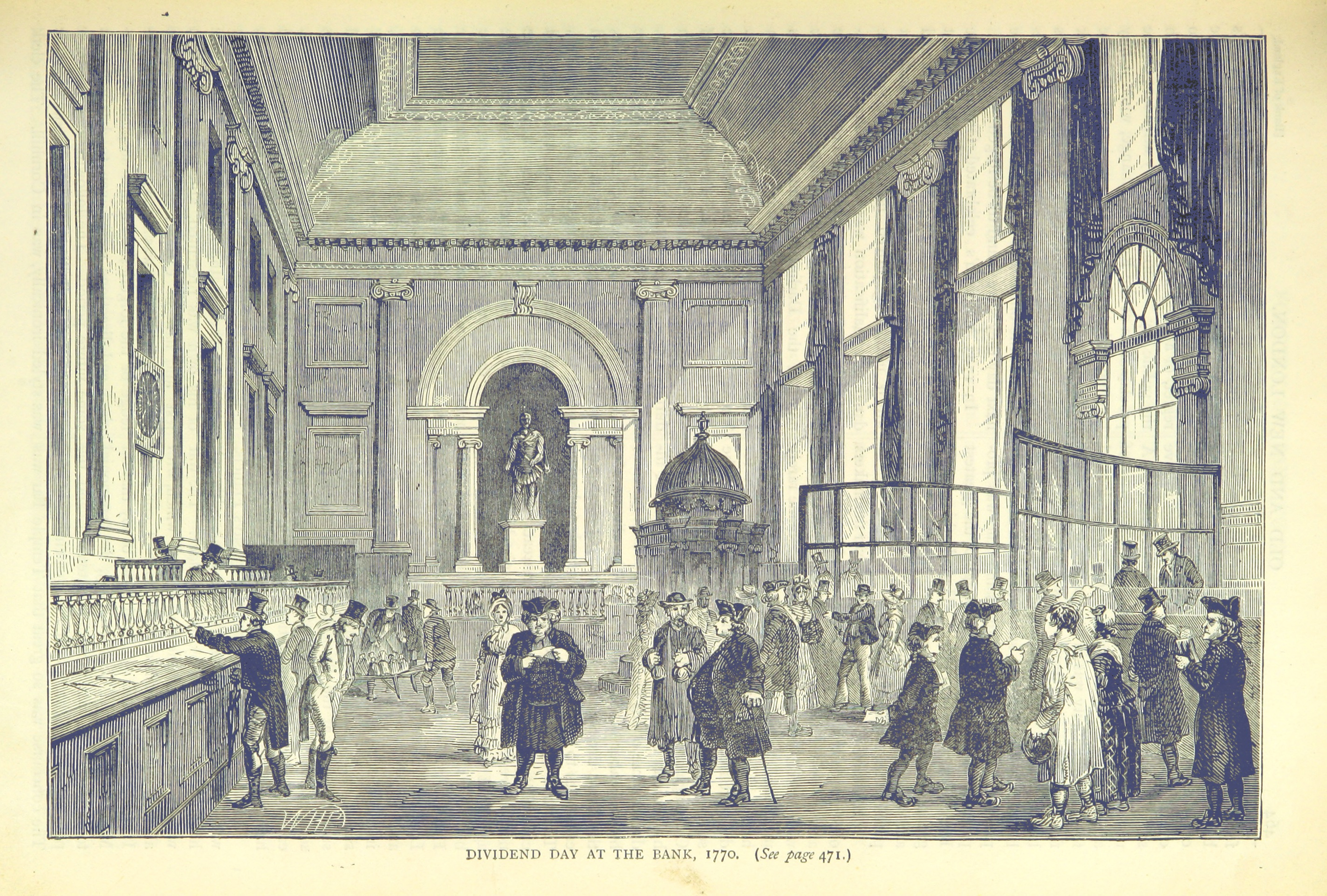
Dividend Day at the Bank, 1770. The Pay Hall of 1732 was one of the Bank's first buildings on Threadneedle Street. (At one time shareholders were required to attend in person for the payment of Government dividends; the practice was abolished in 1910).

In 1700, the Hollow Sword Blade Company was purchased by a group of businessmen who wished to establish a competing English bank (in an action that would today be considered a "back door listing"). The Bank of England's initial monopoly on English banking was due to expire in 1710. However, it was instead renewed, and the Sword Blade company failed to achieve its goal.

The idea and reality of the national debt came about at around this time, and this was also largely managed by the bank. Through the 1715 Ways and Means Act, Parliament authorised the bank to receive subscriptions for a government issue of 5% annuities, designed to raise £910,000; this marked the start of the bank's role in managing Government Stocks, which were a means for people to invest in government debt (previously Government borrowing had been administered directly by the Exchequer). The bank was obliged by the Act to pay half-yearly dividends and to keep a book record of all transfers (as it was already accustomed to do with regard to its own Bank Stock).

The bank did not have a monopoly on lending to the government, however: the South Sea Company had been established in 1711, and in 1720 it too became responsible for part of the UK's national debt, becoming a major competitor to the Bank of England. While the "South Sea Bubble" disaster soon ensued, the company continued managing part of the UK national debt until 1853. The East India Company too was a lender of choice for the government.

In 1734 there were ninety-six members of staff at the bank. The bank's charter was renewed in 1742, and again in 1764. By the 1742 Act the bank became the only joint-stock company allowed to issue bank notes in the metropolis.

==== Threadneedle Street ====
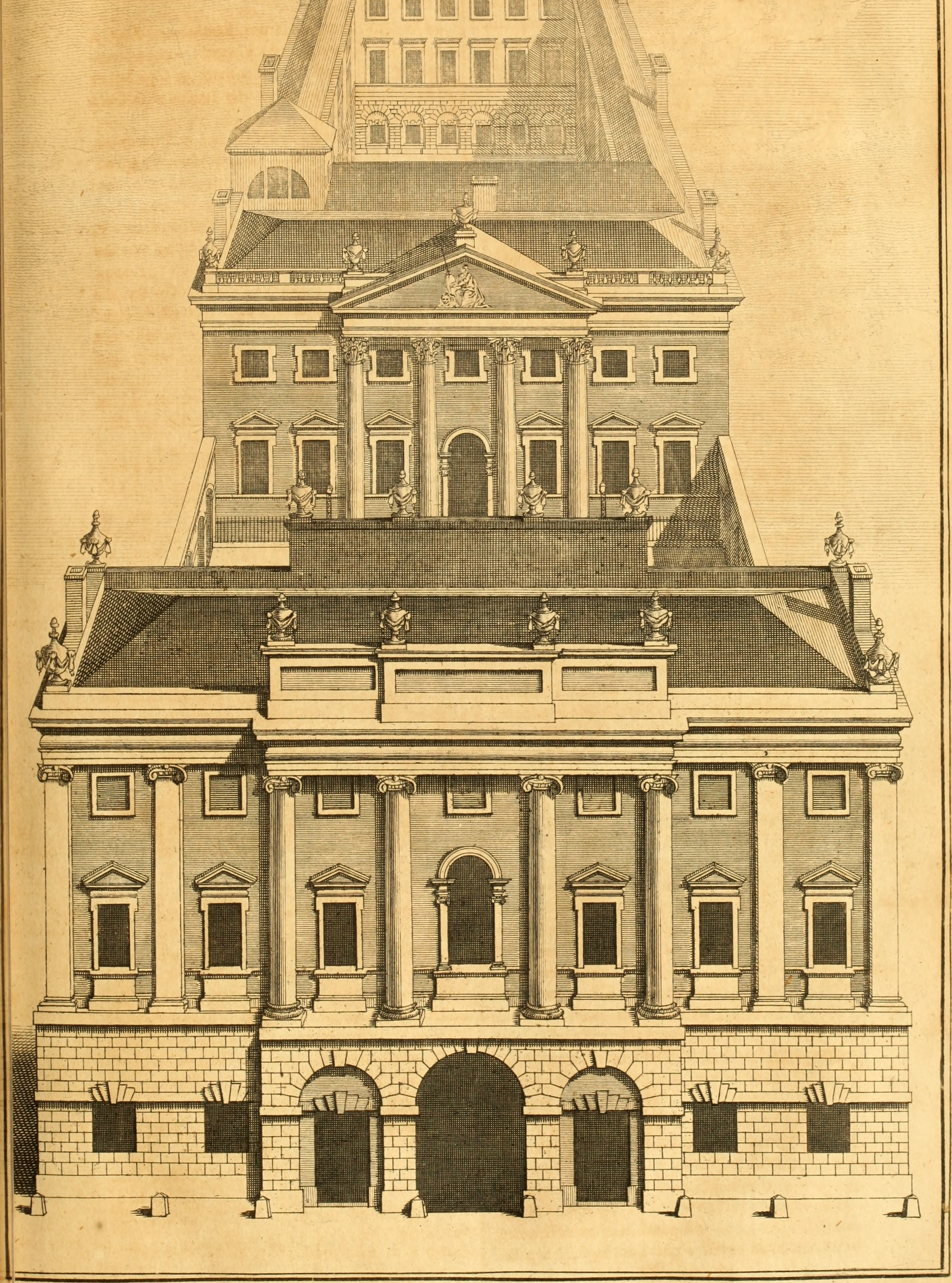
A Perspective View of the Bank of England (published 1756). The bank initially occupied a narrow site on Threadneedle Street: behind the front building stood the pedimented Pay Hall, beyond which lay 'Bullion Court' (and the bank vaults below).

The Bank of England moved to its current location, on the site of Sir John Houblon's house and garden in Threadneedle Street (close by the church of St Christopher le Stocks), in 1734. (The estate had been purchased ten years earlier; Houblon had died in 1712, but his widow lived on in the house until her death in 1731, after which the house was demolished and work on the bank began.)

The newly built premises, designed by George Sampson, occupied a narrow plot (around 80 feet (24 m) wide) extending north from Threadneedle Street. The front building contained transfer offices on the first floor, beneath which was an entrance arch leading to a courtyard. Facing the entrance was the 'main building' of the bank: a large Hall (24 m × 12 m; 79 ft × 40 ft) in which bank notes were issued and exchanged, and where deposits and withdrawals could be made. (Sampson's Great Hall, later known as the Pay Hall, remained in situ and in use until Herbert Baker's comprehensive rebuilding in the late 1920s.) Beyond the Hall was a quadrangle of buildings enclosing a 'spacious and commodious Court-yard' (later known as Bullion Court). On the south side of the quadrangle were the Court Room and Committee Room, on the north side was a large Accountants' Office; on either side were arcaded walkways, with rooms for the senior officers, while the upper floors contained offices and apartments. Beneath the quadrangle were the vaults ('that have very strong Walls and Iron Gates, for the Preservation of the Cash'); access to the courtyard was provided, by way of a passage leading to a 'grand Gateway' on Bartholomew Lane, for the coaches and waggons 'that come frequently loaded with Gold and Silver Bullion'. The pediment above the entrance to the main Hall was decorated with a carved alto relievo figure of Britannia (who had appeared on the common seal of the bank since 30 July 1694); the sculptor was Robert Taylor, who went on to be appointed Architect, in succession to Sampson, in 1764. Inside, the east end of the Hall was dominated by a large statue by John Cheere of King William III, lauded in an accompanying Latin inscription as the bank's founder (conditor); at the opposite end, a large Venetian window looked out on St Christopher's churchyard.

==== Expansion ====
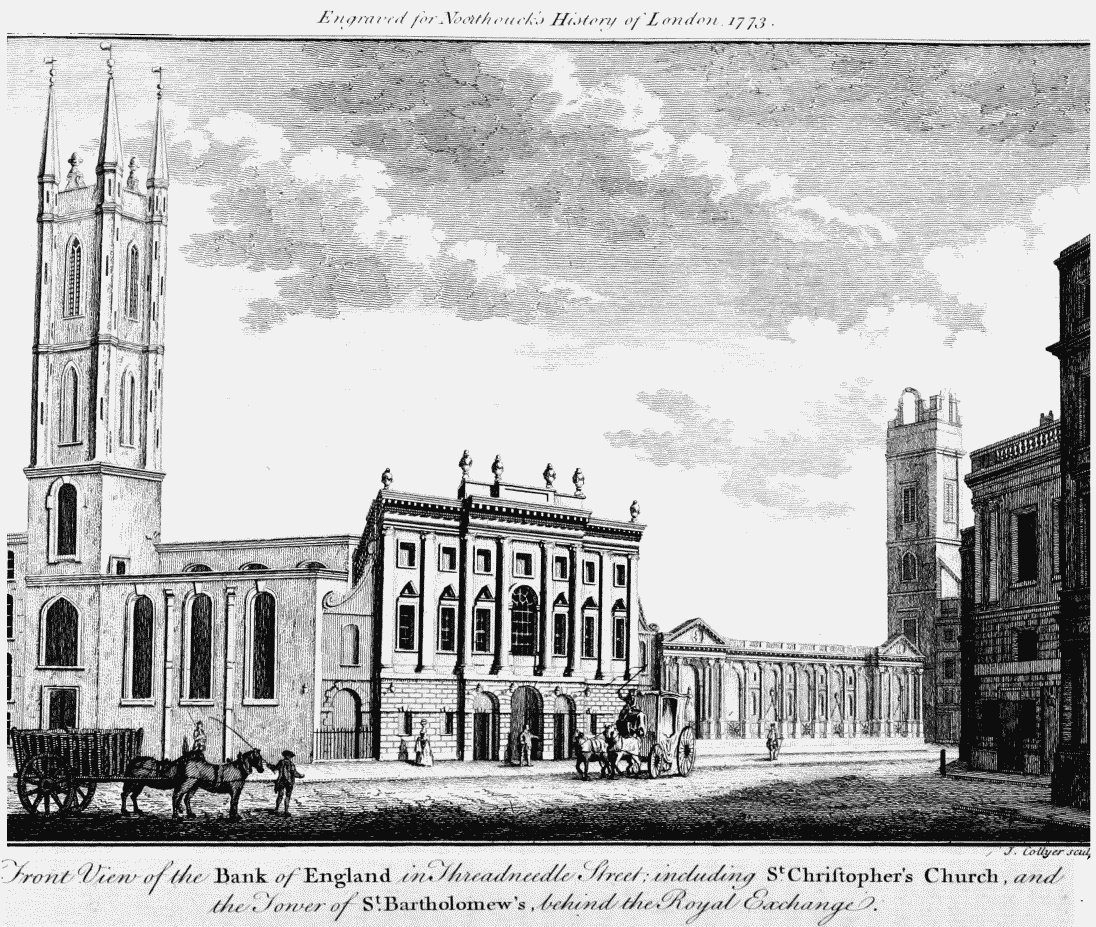
The Threadneedle Street front in 1773, after the addition of Taylor's east wing but before the demolition of St Christopher le Stocks (left)

In the second half of the 18th century the bank gradually acquired neighbouring plots of land to enable it to expand, and after 1765 new buildings began to be added by the bank's newly appointed architect Robert Taylor. North-west of the Pay Hall, overlooking St Christopher's churchyard to the south, Taylor built a suite of rooms for the Directors of the bank centred on a new (much larger) Court Room and Committee Room (When the bank was rebuilt in the 1920s-30s, these rooms were removed from their original ground-floor location and reconstructed on the first floor; they continue to be used for meetings of the bank's Court of Directors and Monetary Policy Committee respectively.). East of the Pay Hall, Taylor built a suite of halls and offices dedicated to the management of stocks and dividends, which more or less doubled the size of the bank's footprint (extending it as far as Bartholomew Lane). These rooms were centred on a large Rotunda, also known as the Brokers' Exchange, where dealing in Government Stock took place; around it were arranged four sizeable Transfer Offices, each corresponding with a different fund (as described in the 1820s: 'In each office under the several letters of the alphabet, are arranged the books on which the names of all persons having property in the funds are registered, as well as the particulars of their respective interests'). All these offices were top-lit, to avoid the need for windows in the external walls.

The bank in 1797: matching east and west wings by Sir Robert Taylor flank Sampson's centrepiece of 1733.

In 1782 the church of St Christopher le Stocks was demolished, allowing the bank to expand westwards along Threadneedle Street. The new west wing was completed to Taylor's design in 1786 (its frontage matching that of Taylor's earlier east wing): it housed the Reduced Annuities Office, the Cheque Office and the Dividend Warrant Office (among others). Immediately to the north lay the former churchyard of St Christopher le Stocks, which was preserved within the complex of buildings as a garden (known as the 'Garden Court'). North of Bullion Court, Taylor built a new four-storey Library, to house the bank's expanding collection of archives.

==== The Bank Picquet ====
The church's demolition had been prompted by the 1780 Gordon Riots, during which rioters reportedly climbed on the church to throw projectiles at the buildings of the bank. During the riots, in June 1780, the Lord Mayor of London petitioned the Secretary of State to send a military guard to protect the bank and the Mansion House. Thenceforward a nightly guard (the 'Bank Picquet') was provided by soldiers of the Household Brigade (a practice which continued until 1973). To house the guard Taylor built a barracks (accessed from a separate entrance on Princes Street) in the north-west corner of the site.

==== John Soane's rebuilding ====
Bank of England Site Act 1793
- Act of Parliament
- Parliament of Great Britain
- Long title: An Act to enable the Governor and Company of the Bank of England to purchase certain Houses and Ground contiguous to the Bank of England.
- Citation: 33 Geo. 3. c. 15
- Territorial extent: Great Britain

Dates
- Royal assent: 28 March 1793
- Commencement: 13 December 1792 (Note: Start of session.)
- Repealed: 8 November 1995
Other legislation
Repealed by	Statute Law (Repeals) Act 1995

Status: Repealed

Text of statute as originally enacted

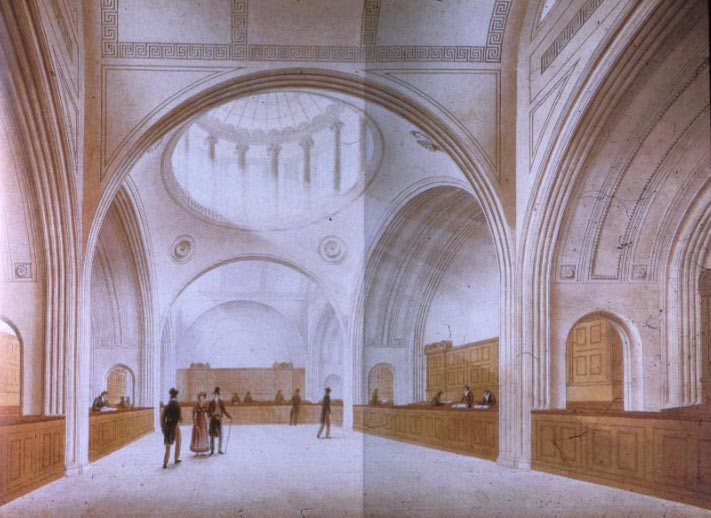
The Dividend Office as rebuilt by John Soane

Sir Robert Taylor died in 1788 and in his place the bank appointed John Soane as Architect and Surveyor (he would remain in post until 1827). Under his direction, the bank was further expanded and partially rebuilt, bit by bit but to a cohesive plan. A survey of the buildings, undertaken at the start of his tenure, identified some problems, which were promptly remedied by Soane: for example in 1795 he rebuilt the Rotunda and two of the adjacent Transfer Offices (the Bank Stock Office and the Four Per Cent Office), replacing Taylor's timber roofs, which were leaking, with more durable stonework. At the same time Soane was tasked with purchasing properties to the north-east, with compulsory purchase powers granted by the Bank of England Site Act 1793 (33 Geo. 3. c. 15), so as to enable the bank to expand in that direction as far as Lothbury. Between 1794 and 1800 he designed a cohesive set of buildings within the new irregularly-shaped site: he reconfigured Bullion Court and provided a new entrance route for vehicles from the north, which was named Lothbury Court; to the west of this he built a new Chief Cashier's office, and rooms for the Secretary and Chief Accountant; to the east he constructed a new Library block and added a fifth Transfer Office (the Consols Transfer Office) to the north of the other four.

==== The Brokers' Exchange in the Bank ====
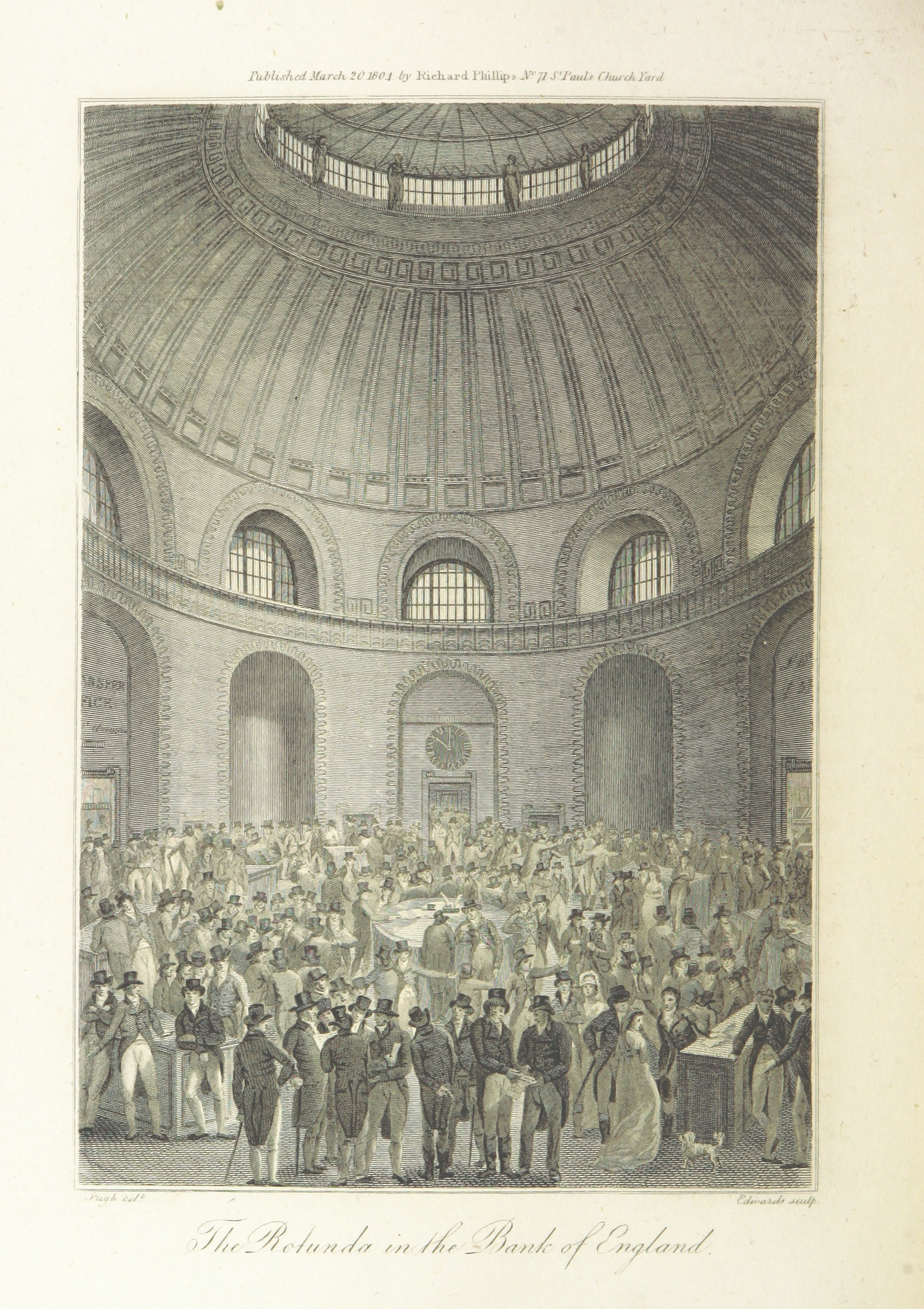
Soane's Rotunda, when still in use as a trading floor (1804)

In the late 18th and early 19th century, prior to the establishment of the London Stock Exchange, the Rotunda in the Bank of England was used as a trading floor 'where stockbrokers, stockjobbers, and other persons, meet for the purpose of transacting business in public funds'. Branching off from the Rotunda were 'offices appropriated to the management of each particular stock' containing books listing every individual's registered interest in the fund. The use of the Rotunda for trading ceased in 1838, but it continued to be used for the cashing of fundholders' dividend warrants.

==== Conflicts and credit crises ====
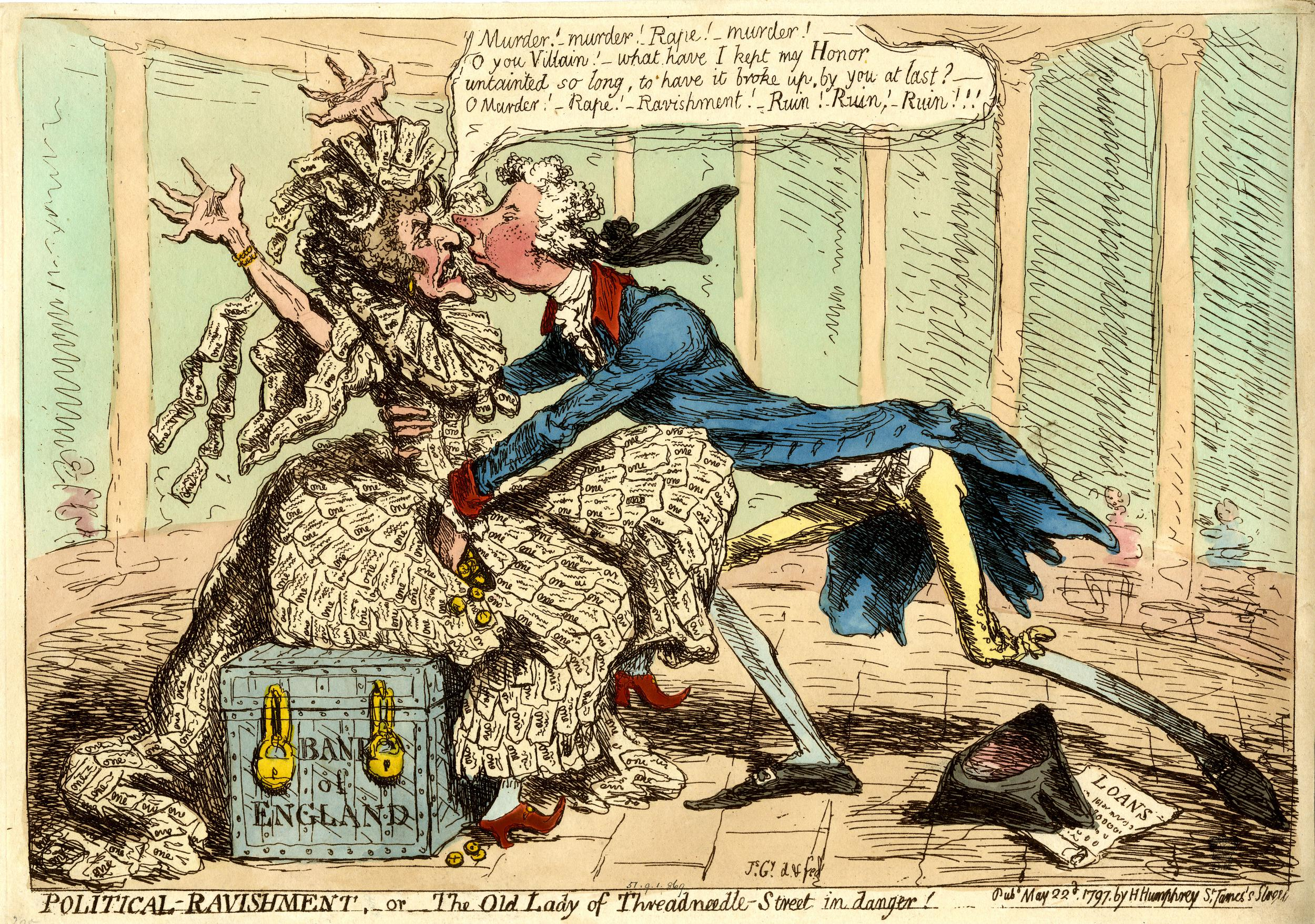
Satirical cartoon protesting against the introduction of paper money, by James Gillray, 1797. The "Old Lady of Threadneedle St" (the bank personified) is ravished by William Pitt the Younger.

The credit crisis of 1772 has been described as the first modern banking crisis faced by the Bank of England. The whole City of London was in uproar when Alexander Fordyce was declared bankrupt. In August 1773, the Bank of England assisted the EIC with a loan. The strain upon the reserves of the Bank of England was not eased until towards the end of the year.

During the American War of Independence, business for the bank was so good that George Washington remained a shareholder throughout the period.

By the bank's charter renewal in 1781, it was also the bankers' bank – keeping enough gold to pay its notes on demand until 26 February 1797 when war had so diminished gold reserves that – following an invasion scare caused by the Battle of Fishguard days earlier – the government prohibited the bank from paying out in gold by the passing of the bank Restriction Act 1797. This prohibition lasted until 1821.

In 1798, during the French Revolutionary Wars, a Corps of bank Volunteers was formed (of between 450 and 500 men) to defend the bank in the event of an invasion. It was disbanded in 1802, but promptly re-formed the following year at the start of the Napoleonic Wars. Its soldiers were trained, in the event of an invasion, to remove the gold and silver from the vaults to a remote location, along with the banknote printing presses and certain important records. An armoury was provided on site at Threadneedle Street for their arms and accoutrements. The Corps was finally disbanded in 1814.

=== 19th century ===
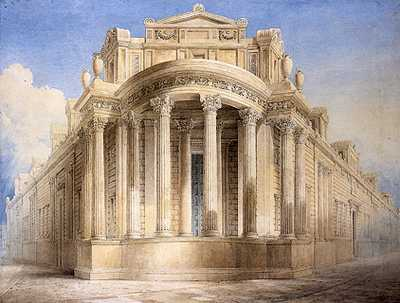
View of the Bank of England taken from the north-west angle as erected in 1805 (J. M. Gandy, 1825)

At the start of the 19th century a plan was enacted by John Soane for the further extension of the bank's premises, this time to the north-west (necessitating the rerouting of Princes Street, to form the new western boundary of the site). Much of the area of the new extension was taken up with steam-powered presses for the printing of banknotes (notes continued to be printed on site until the First World War, when the former St Luke's Hospital was acquired and converted into the bank's printing works). Soane continued in post until 1833; in the last years before his retirement he completed his rebuilding of Taylor's east wing and reconfigured Sampson and Taylor's street-facing façades to make the entire perimeter of the complex a coherent whole.

In 1811, an 'ingeniously contrived clock' by Thwaites & Co. was installed above the Pay Hall: as well as chiming the hours and quarters, it conveyed the time remotely (by means of brass rods extending a total of 700 feet (210 m) in length) to dials located in sixteen different offices around the site.

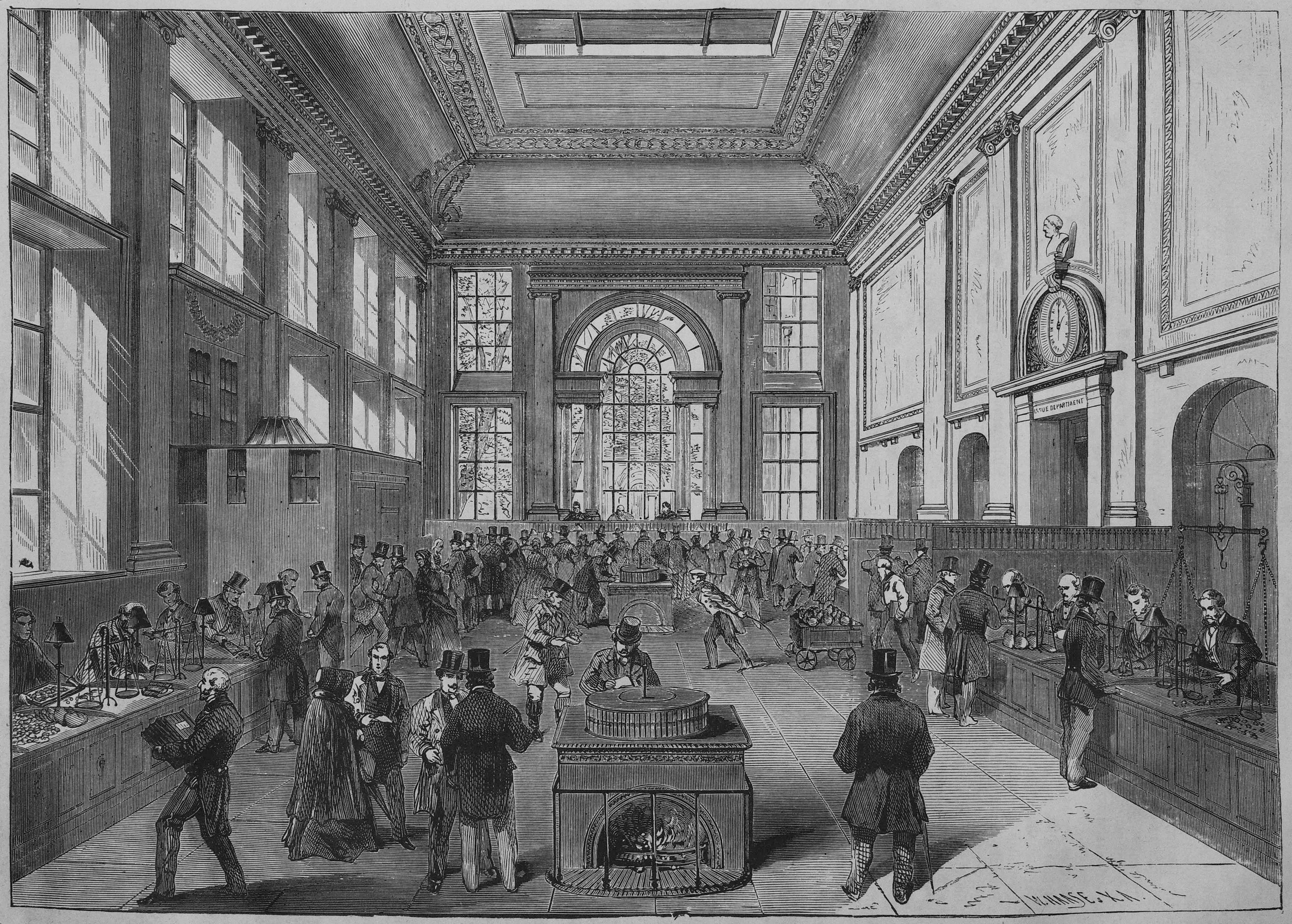
The Pay Hall (where notes were exchanged for coins, and vice versa) pictured in 1866

The 'panic of 1825' highlighted risks inherent in the bank's three-way split loyalties: to its stockholders, to the Government (and thereby to the public), and to its commercial banking customers. In 1825–26 the bank was able to avert a liquidity crisis when Nathan Mayer Rothschild succeeded in supplying it with gold; nevertheless, after the crisis, many country and provincial banks failed prompting numerous commercial bankruptcies. The passing of the Country Bankers Act 1826 allowed the bank to open provincial branches for the better distribution of its banknotes (at the time small country banks, some of which were significantly undercapitalised, issued their own notes); by the end of the following year eight Bank of England branches had been set up around the country.

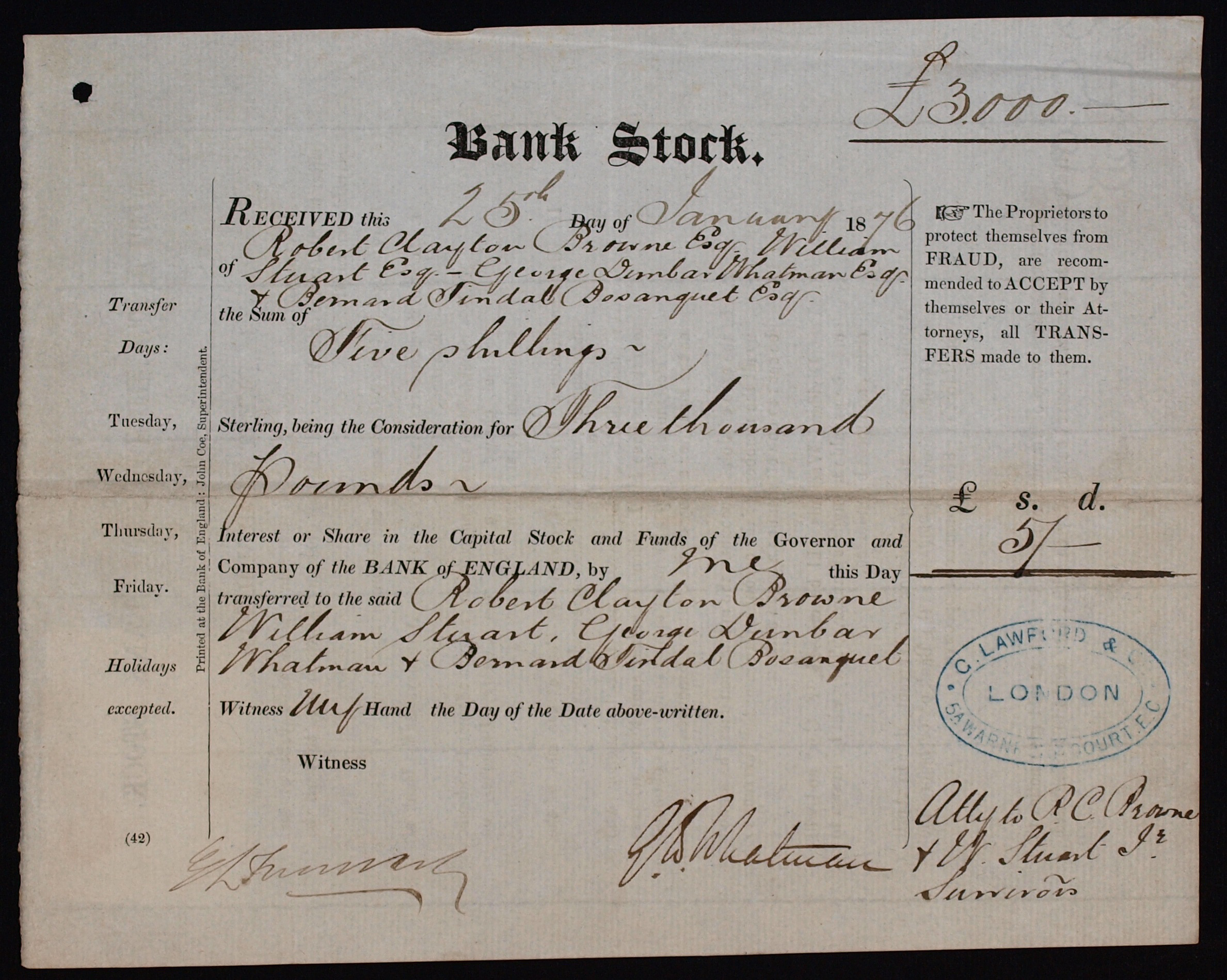
Bank Stock of the Bank of England, issued 25 January 1876

The Bank Charter Act 1844 tied the issue of notes to the gold reserves and gave the Bank of England sole rights with regard to the issue of banknotes in England. Private banks that had previously had that right retained it, provided that their headquarters were outside London and that they deposited security against the notes that they issued; but they were offered inducements to relinquish this right. (Note: The last private bank in England to issue its own notes was Thomas Fox's Fox, Fowler and Company bank in Wellington, which rapidly expanded until it merged with Lloyds Bank in 1927. They remained legal tender until 1964. There are nine notes left in circulation; one is housed at Tone Dale House, Wellington.)

The bank acted as lender of last resort for the first time in the panic of 1866.

=== 20th century ===
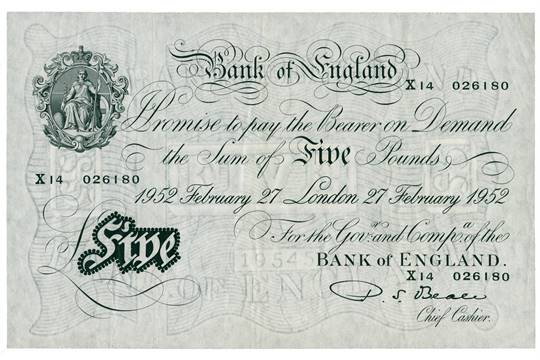
The Bank's classic white five pound note remained in circulation until 1957.

Until 1931 Britain was on the gold standard, meaning the value of sterling was fixed by the price of gold. That year, the Bank of England had to take Britain off the gold standard due to the effects of Great Depression spreading to Europe.

==== 1913 attempted bombing ====
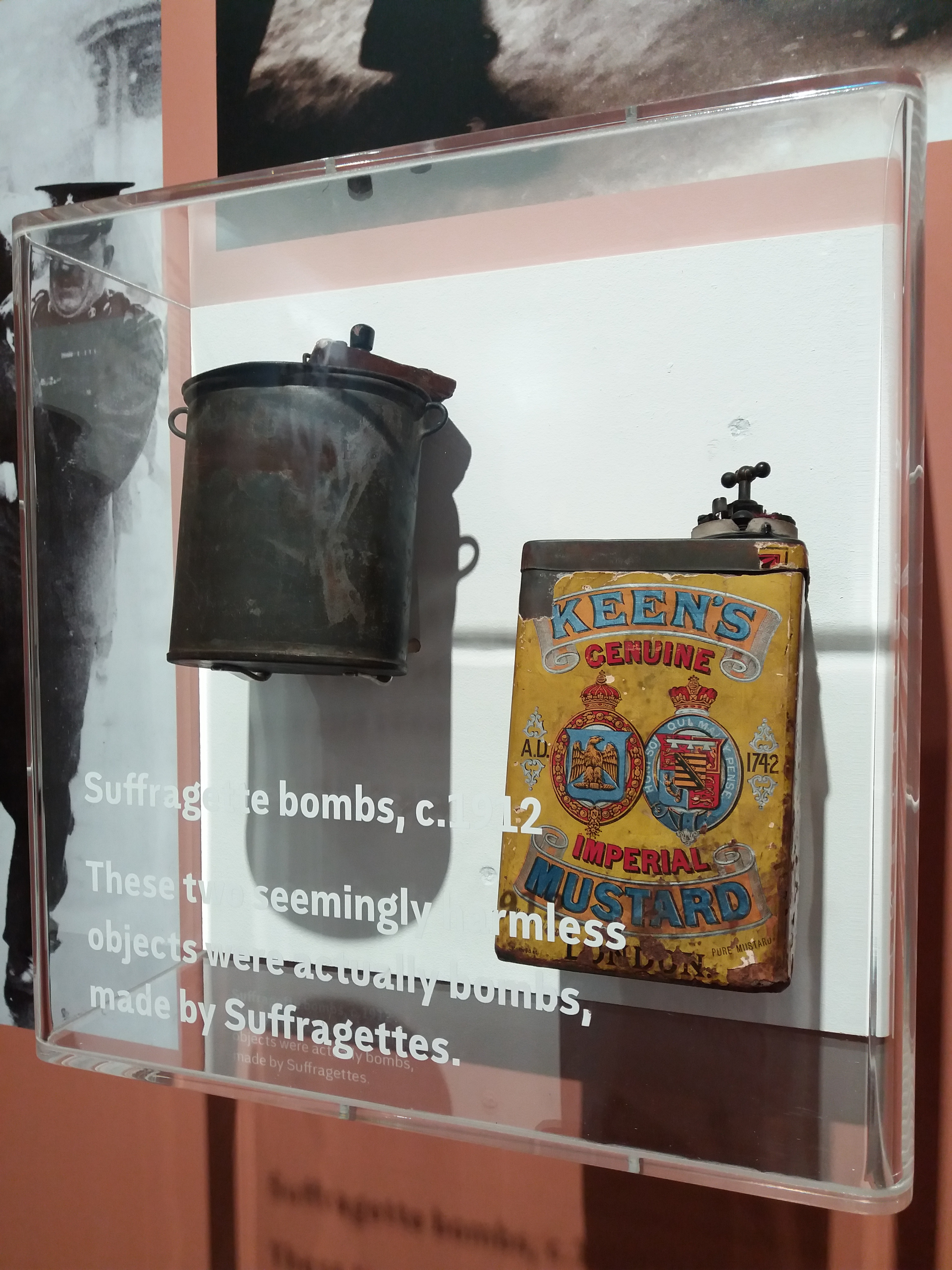
Two suffragette bombs on display at the City of London Police Museum in 2019. The bomb on the left was used in an attempted bombing outside the bank on 4 April 1913, an attack that likely would have caused many casualties had it not been foiled.

A terrorist bombing was attempted outside the Bank of England building on 4 April 1913. A bomb was discovered smoking and ready to explode next to railings outside the building. The bomb had been planted as part of the suffragette bombing and arson campaign, in which the Women's Social and Political Union (WSPU) launched a series of politically motivated bombing and arson attacks nationwide as part of their campaign for women's suffrage. The bomb was defused before it could detonate, in what was then one of the busiest public streets in the capital, which likely prevented many civilian casualties. The bomb had been planted the day after WSPU leader Emmeline Pankhurst was sentenced to three years' imprisonment for carrying out a bombing on the home of politician David Lloyd George.

The remains of the bomb, which was built into a milk churn, are now on display at the City of London Police Museum.

==== Restructuring and rebuilding ====
During the governorship of Montagu Norman, from 1920 to 1944, the bank made deliberate efforts to move away from commercial banking and become a central bank. A later Governor, Robin Leigh-Pemberton, described it as 'a time of rapid change, in which we began to move away from the clerical traditions of 200 years [...] and to accept specialisation, mechanisation and modern management disciplines'. Economists and statisticians began to be employed at the bank in increasing number. In 1931 the 'Peacock Committee', set up to advise on organisational improvements, published recommendations which included the appointment of paid executive Directors (alongside the traditional non-executive members of the Court). It also recommended reconfiguration of the bank's traditional departmental structures.

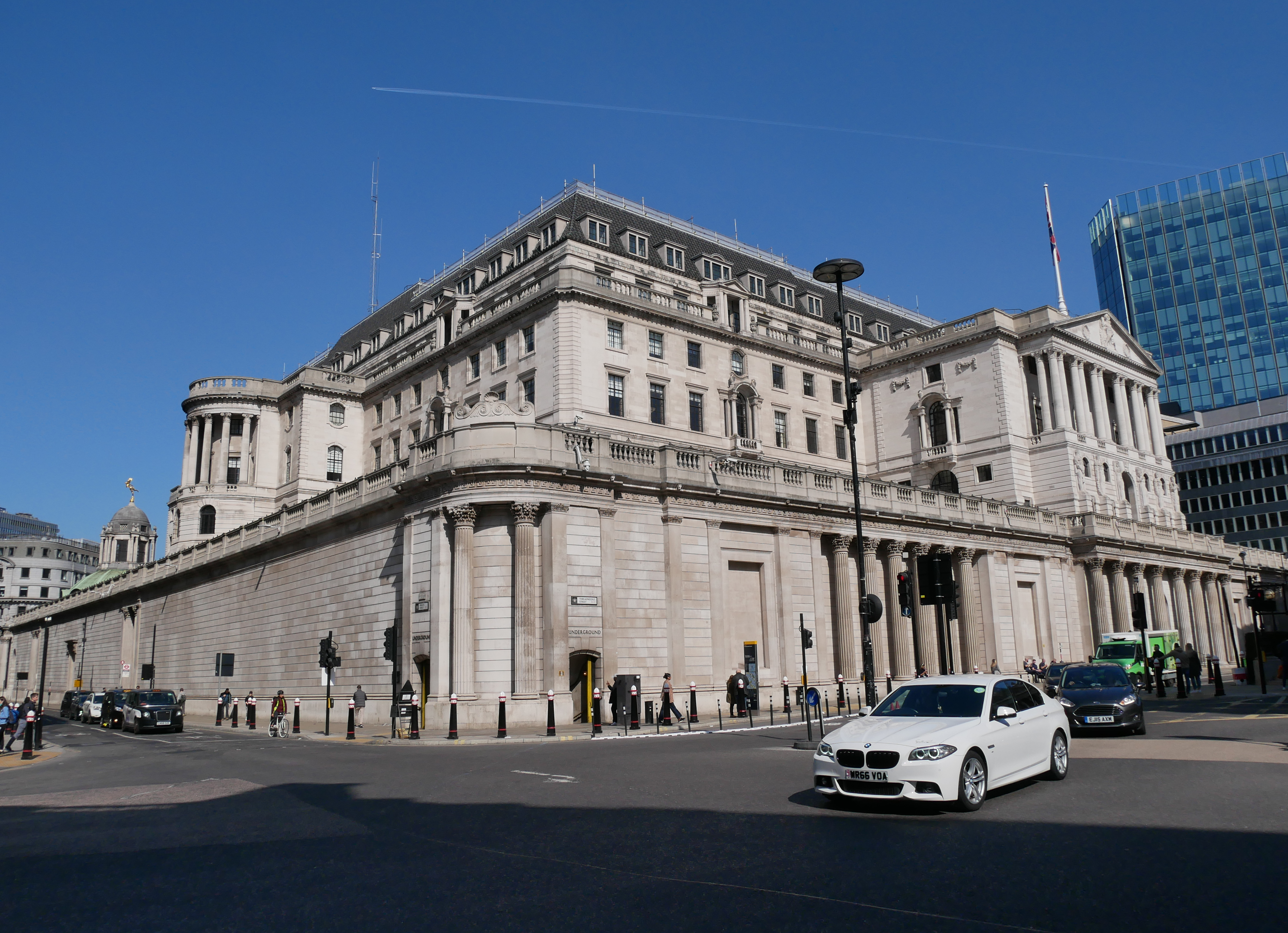
Baker's rebuilt bank stands behind Soane's part-preserved curtain wall

The work of the bank had significantly increased since the end of the First World War, and the decision was taken to expand. Between 1925 and 1939 the bank's headquarters on Threadneedle Street were comprehensively rebuilt by Herbert Baker. (This involved the demolition of most of Sir John Soane's buildings, an act described by architectural historian Nikolaus Pevsner as "the greatest architectural crime, in the City of London, of the twentieth century".) Initially the plan had been to retain Soane's banking halls behind the curtain wall, but this proved challenging so they were instead demolished and rebuilt in facsimile. The demolition and rebuilding took place in stages, with staff moving from one part of the building to another (or, in some cases, into temporary accommodation at Finsbury Circus). The bullion and securities remained on site throughout. During reconstruction human remains pertaining to the old churchyard of St Christopher le Stocks were exhumed and reburied at Nunhead Cemetery.

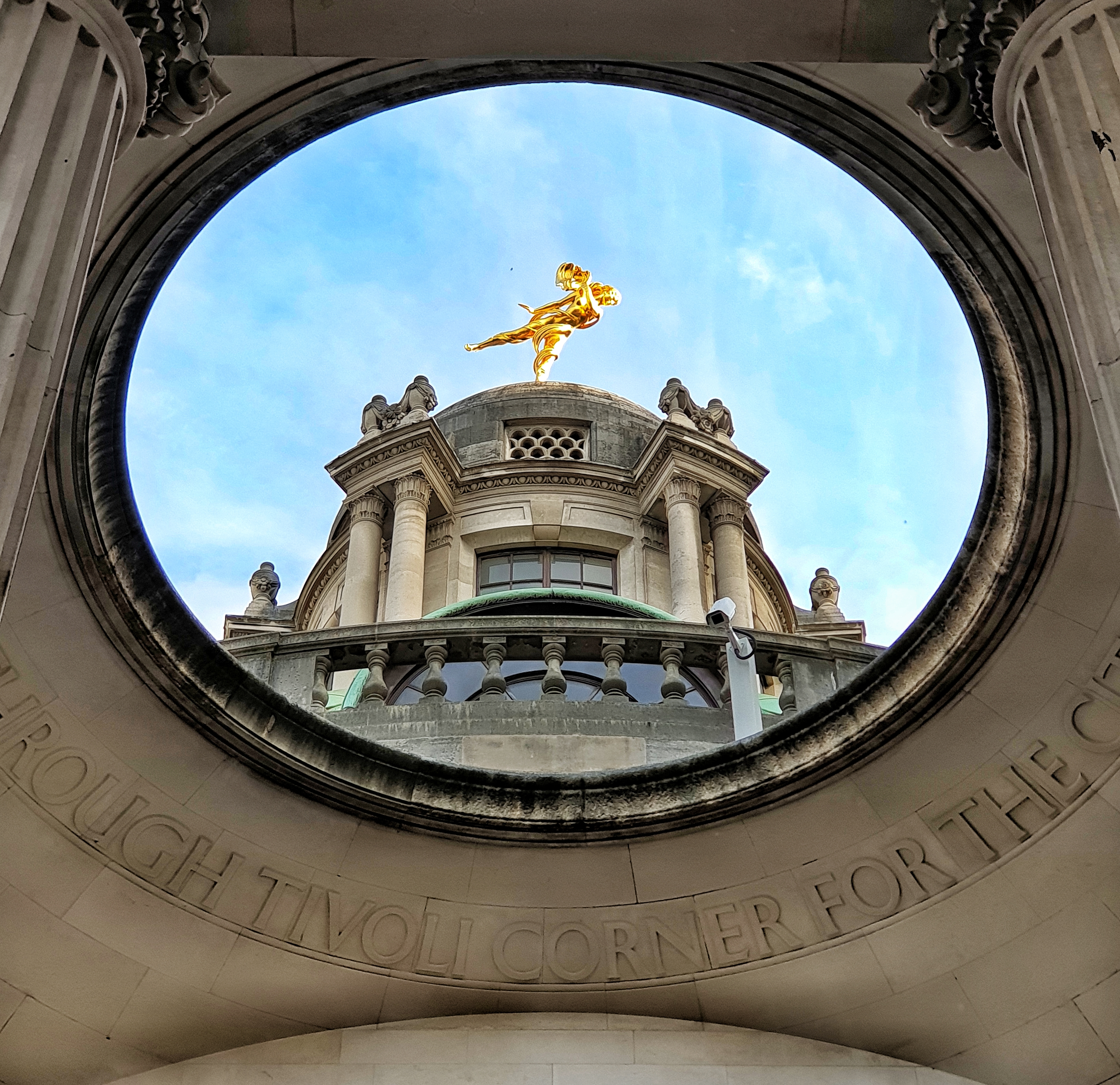
Statue of Ariel by Charles Wheeler

Baker's steel-framed building stands seven storeys high, with a further three vault storeys extending below ground level. It is decorated with sculpture and bronze work by Charles Wheeler, plasterwork by Joseph Armitage, and mosaics by Boris Anrep. The bank today is a Grade I listed building.

1939 saw the introduction of Exchange Controls in the United Kingdom at the outbreak of the Second World War; these were administered by the bank. During WWII, over 10% of the face value of circulating Pound Sterling banknotes were forgeries produced by Germany.

A number of the bank's operations and staff were relocated to Hampshire for the duration of the war, including the printing works (which moved to Overton), the Accountant's Department (which went to Hurstbourne Park) and various other offices. Those who remained at Threadneedle Street, including the Directors, moved their offices into the underground vaults.

==== Post-war nationalisation ====
In 1946, shortly after the end of Montagu Norman's tenure, the bank was nationalised by the Labour government. At the same time the number of Directors was reduced to sixteen (four of whom were full-time Executive Directors).

The bank pursued the multiple goals of Keynesian economics after 1945, especially "easy money" and low-interest rates to support aggregate demand. It tried to keep a fixed exchange rate and attempted to deal with inflation and sterling weakness by credit and exchange controls.

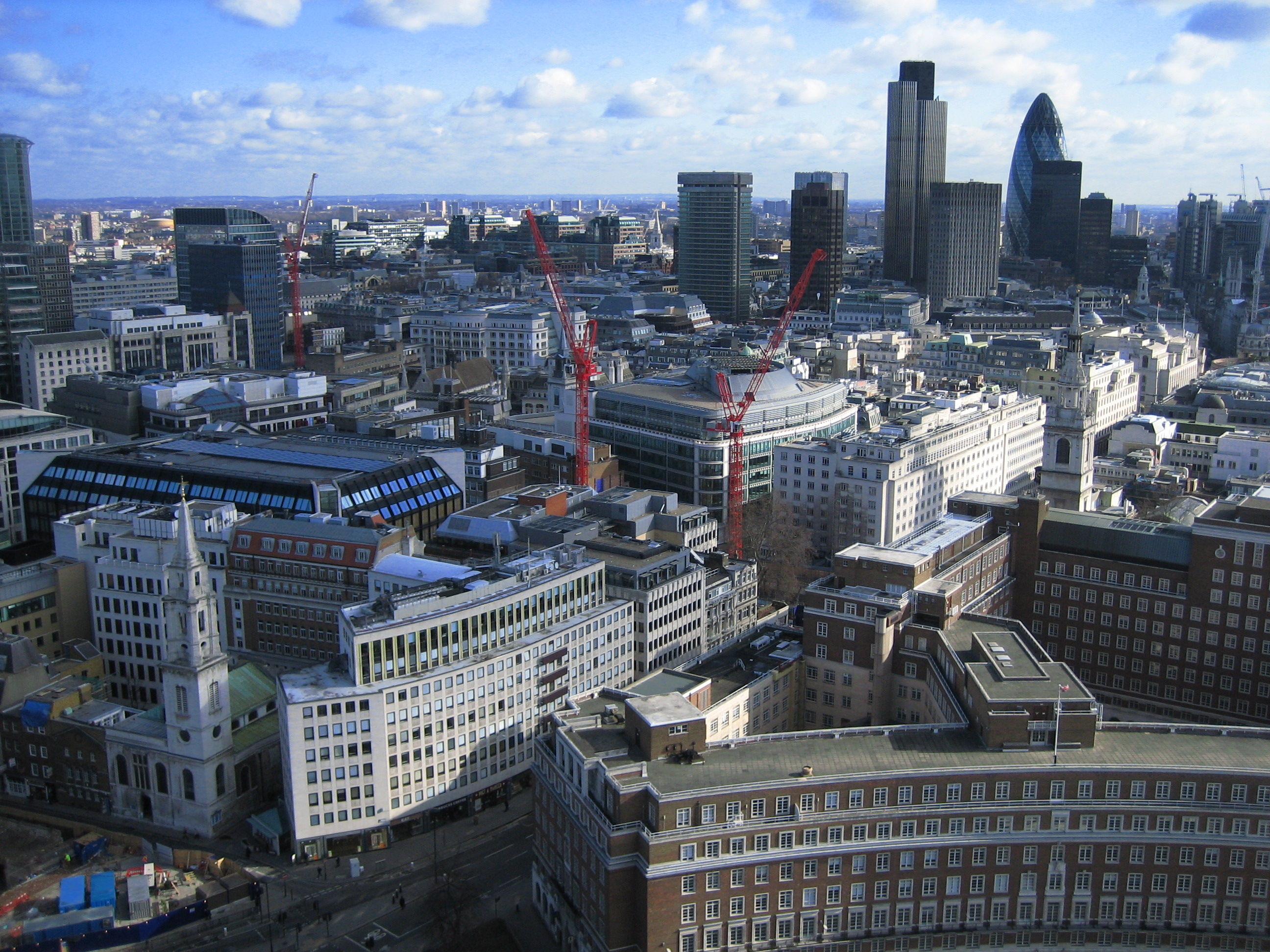
Bank of England New Change (bottom right) as seen from St Paul's

After the war, the very large Accountant's Department (which managed the stock side of the bank) moved back to London from Hampshire. Its designated office-space at Threadneedle Street, however, had in the meantime been taken over by the Exchange Control office. The department was instead provided with temporary accommodation (once more in Finsbury Circus), pending construction of a new building, which would occupy a 0.8 hectares (2 acres) bombsite immediately to the east of St Paul's Cathedral. 'Bank of England New Change' was designed by Victor Heal, and opened in 1957 (at the time it was London's biggest post-war rebuilding project); the new building contained several staff amenities alongside the office accommodation and, at street level, retail units were let to an assortment of businesses. The bank had the building on a 200-year lease; but with the advent of computerisation staff numbers were drastically reduced in the 1980s-90s; parts of the building were let to other firms (most notably the law firm Allen & Overy). The bank sold the building in 2000 and in 2007 it was demolished; One New Change now stands on the site.

The bank's "10 bob note" (10 shilling note) was withdrawn from circulation in 1970 in preparation for Decimal Day in 1971.

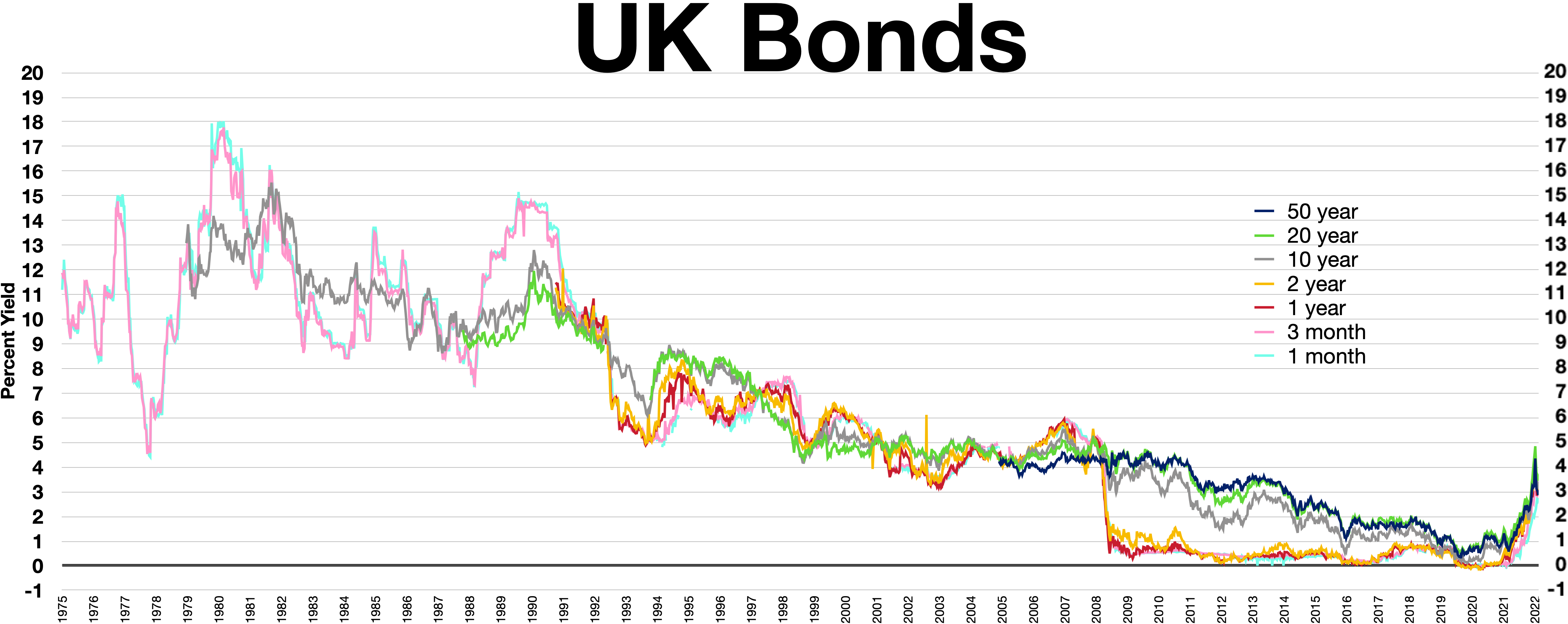
United Kingdom bonds 50 year 20 year 10 year 2 year 1 year 3 month 1 month

In 1977 the bank set up a wholly owned subsidiary called Bank of England Nominees Limited (BOEN), a now-defunct private limited company, with two of its hundred £1 shares issued. According to its memorandum of association, its objectives were: "To act as Nominee or agent or attorney either solely or jointly with others, for any person or persons, partnership, company, corporation, government, state, organisation, sovereign, province, authority, or public body, or any group or association of them". Bank of England Nominees Limited was granted an exemption by Edmund Dell, Secretary of State for Trade, from the disclosure requirements under Section 27(9) of the Companies Act 1976, because "it was considered undesirable that the disclosure requirements should apply to certain categories of shareholders". The Bank of England is also protected by its royal charter status and the Official Secrets Act. BOEN was a vehicle for governments and heads of state to invest in UK companies (subject to approval from the Secretary of State), providing they undertake "not to influence the affairs of the company". In its later years, BOEN was no longer exempt from company law disclosure requirements. Although a dormant company, dormancy does not preclude a company actively operating as a nominee shareholder. BOEN had two shareholders: the Bank of England, and the Secretary of the Bank of England.

The reserve requirement for banks to hold a minimum fixed proportion of their deposits as reserves at the Bank of England was abolished in 1981. The contemporary transition from Keynesian economics to Chicago economics was analysed by Nicholas Kaldor in The Scourge of Monetarism.

The handing over of monetary policy to the bank became a key plank of the Liberal Democrats' economic policy for the 1992 general election. Conservative MP Nicholas Budgen had also proposed this as a private member's bill in 1996, but the bill failed as it had the support of neither the government nor the opposition.

The UK government left the expensive-to-maintain European Exchange Rate Mechanism in September 1992, in an action that cost HM Treasury over £3 billion. This led to closer communication between the government and the bank.

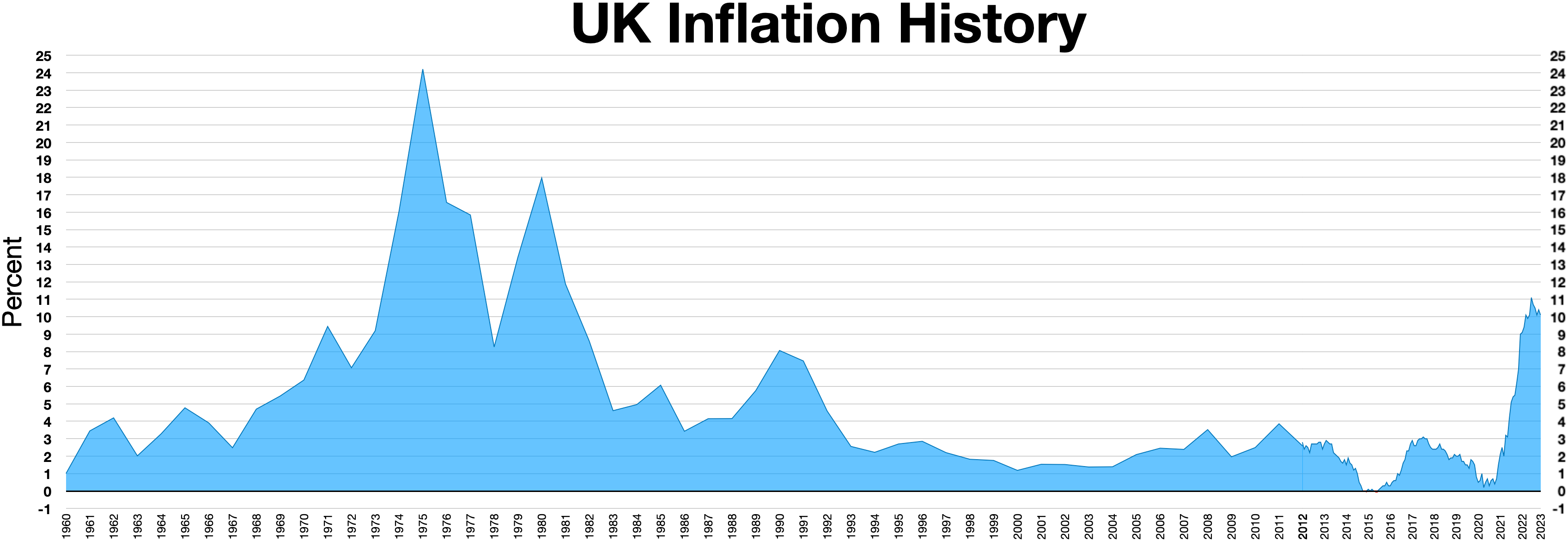
UK inflation history since 1960

In 1993, the bank produced its first Inflation Report for the government, detailing inflationary trends and pressures. This annually produced report remains one of the bank's major publications. The success of inflation targeting in the United Kingdom has been attributed to the bank's focus on transparency. The Bank of England has been a leader in producing innovative ways of communicating information to the public, especially through its Inflation Report, which many other central banks have emulated.

The bank celebrated its three-hundredth birthday in 1994.

In 1996, the bank produced its first Financial Stability Review. This annual publication became known as the Financial Stability Report in 2006. Also that year, the bank set up its real-time gross settlement (RTGS) system to improve risk-free settlement between UK banks.

On 6 May 1997, following the 1997 general election that brought a Labour government to power for the first time since 1979, it was announced by the Chancellor of the Exchequer, Gordon Brown, that the bank would be granted operational independence over monetary policy. Under the terms of the Bank of England Act 1998, which came into force on 1 June 1998, the bank's Monetary Policy Committee (MPC) was given sole responsibility for setting interest rates to meet the Government's Retail Prices Index (RPI) inflation target of 2.5%. The target has changed to 2% since the Consumer Price Index (CPI) replaced the Retail Prices Index as the Treasury's inflation index. If inflation overshoots or undershoots the target by more than 1% the Governor has to write a letter to the Chancellor of the Exchequer explaining why, and how he will remedy the situation.

Independent central banks that adopt an inflation target are known as Friedmanite central banks. This change in Labour's politics was described by Skidelsky in The Return of the Master as a mistake and as an adoption of the rational expectations hypothesis as promulgated by Alan Walters. Inflation targets combined with central bank independence have been characterised as a "starve the beast" strategy creating a lack of money in the public sector.

in June 1998 responsibility for the regulation and supervision of the banking and insurance industries was transferred from the bank to the Financial Services Authority. A memorandum of understanding described the terms under which the bank, the Treasury, and the FSA would work toward the common aim of increased financial stability. (Ten years later, however, after the 2008 financial crisis, new banking legislation transferred the responsibility for regulation and supervision of the banking and insurance industries back to the Bank of England).

=== 21st century ===
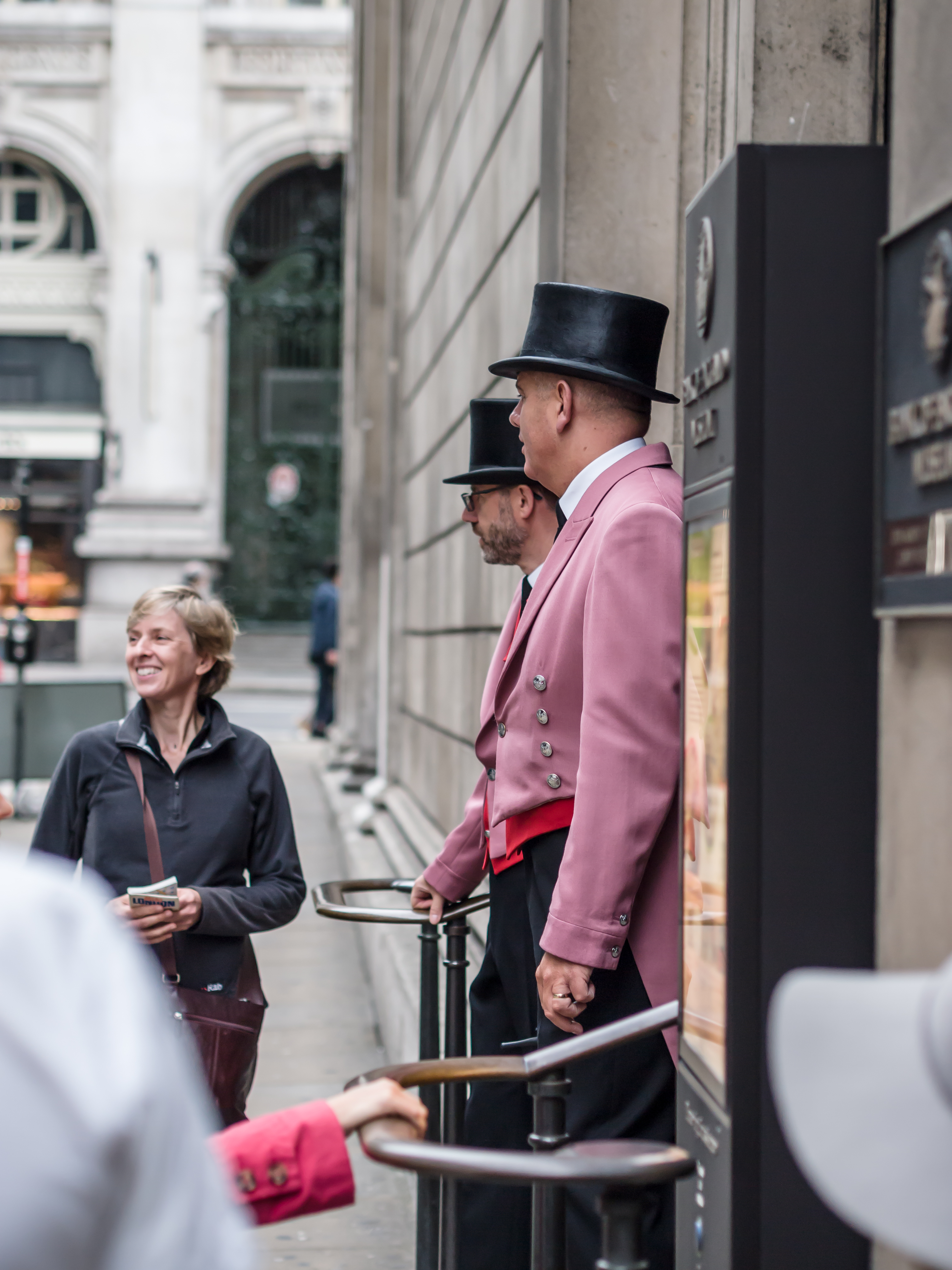
2013: since the 18th century the bank's gatekeepers have worn 'pinks' (a livery associated with Sir John Houblon).

The bank decided to sell its banknote-printing operations to De La Rue in December 2002, under the advice of Close Brothers Corporate Finance Ltd.

Mervyn King became the Governor of the Bank of England on 30 June 2003.

In 2009, a request made to HM Treasury under the Freedom of Information Act sought details about the 3% Bank of England stock owned by unnamed shareholders whose identity the bank is not at liberty to disclose. In a letter of reply dated 15 October 2009, HM Treasury explained that "Some of the 3% Treasury stock which was used to compensate former owners of bank stock has not been redeemed. However, interest is paid out twice a year and it is not the case that this has been accumulating and compounding."

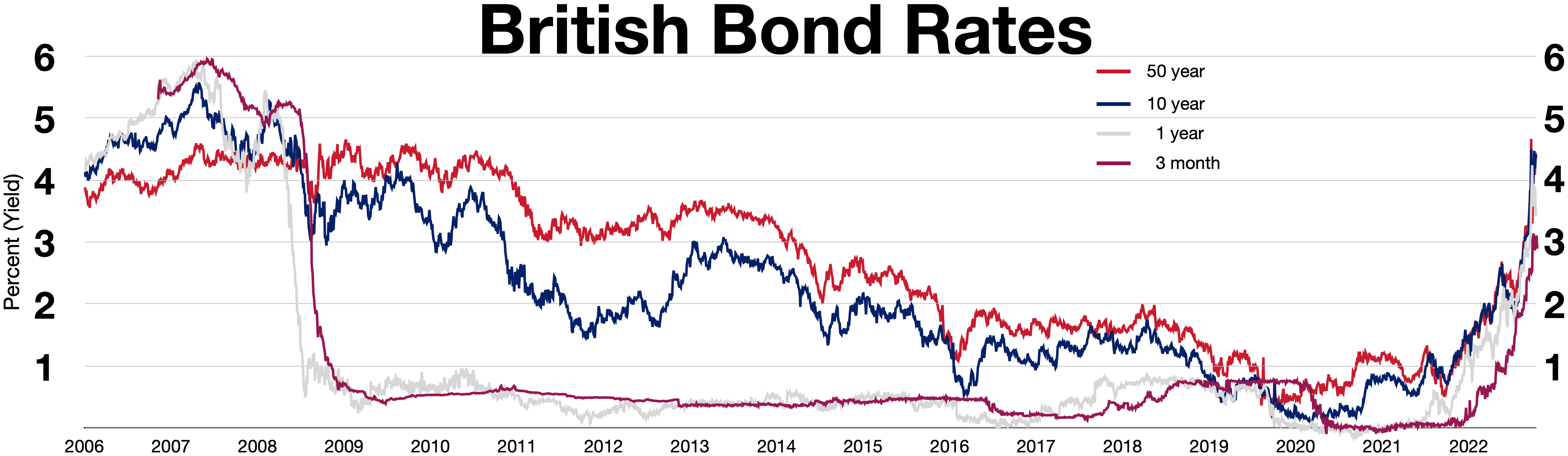
UK bond rates 50 year bond 10 year bond 1 year bond 3 month bond

In 2010, the incoming Chancellor announced his intention to merge the Financial Services Authority back into the bank. In 2011 an interim Financial Policy Committee (FPC) was created (as a mirror committee to the Monetary Policy Committee) to spearhead the bank's new mandate on financial stability. The Financial Services Act 2012 gave the bank additional functions and bodies, including an independent FPC, the Prudential Regulation Authority (PRA), and more powers to supervise financial market infrastructure providers. It also created the independent Financial Conduct Authority. These bodies are responsible for macroprudential regulation of all UK banks and insurance companies.

Canadian Mark Carney assumed the post of Governor of the Bank of England on 1 July 2013. He served an initial five-year term rather than the typical eight. He became the first Governor not to be a United Kingdom citizen but has since been granted citizenship. At Government request, his term was extended to 2019, then again to 2020. As of January 2014, the bank also had four Deputy Governors.

BOEN was dissolved, following liquidation, in July 2017.

Andrew Bailey succeeded Carney as the Governor of the Bank of England on 16 March 2020.

=== Asset purchase facility ===
The bank has operated, since January 2009, an Asset Purchase Facility (APF) to buy "high-quality assets financed by the issue of Treasury bills and the DMO's cash management operations" and thereby improve liquidity in the credit markets. It has, since March 2009, also provided the mechanism by which the bank's policy of quantitative easing (QE) is achieved, under the auspices of the MPC. Along with managing the QE funds, which were £895B at peak, the APF continues to operate its corporate facilities. Both are undertaken by a subsidiary company of the Bank of England, the Bank of England Asset Purchase Facility Fund Limited (BEAPFF).

QE was primarily designed as an instrument of monetary policy. The mechanism required the Bank of England to purchase government bonds on the secondary market, financed by creating new central bank money. This would have the effect of increasing the asset prices of the bonds purchased, thereby lowering yields and dampening longer-term interest rates. The policy's aim was initially to ease liquidity constraints in the sterling reserves system but evolved into a wider policy to provide economic stimulus.

QE was enacted in six tranches between 2009 and 2020. At its peak in 2020, the portfolio totalled £895 billion, comprising £875 billion of UK government bonds and £20 billion of high-grade commercial bonds.

In February 2022, the Bank of England announced its intention to commence winding down the QE portfolio. Initially this would be achieved by not replacing tranches of maturing bonds, and would later be accelerated through active bond sales.

In August 2022, the Bank of England reiterated its intention to accelerate the QE wind-down through active bond sales. This policy was affirmed in an exchange of letters between the Bank of England and the UK Chancellor of the Exchequer in September 2022. Between February 2022 and September 2022, a total of £37.1B of government bonds matured, reducing the outstanding stock from £875.0B at the end of 2021 to £837.9B. In addition, a total of £1.1B of corporate bonds matured, reducing the stock from £20.0B to £18.9B, with sales of the remaining stock planned to begin on 27 September.

== Banknote issues ==
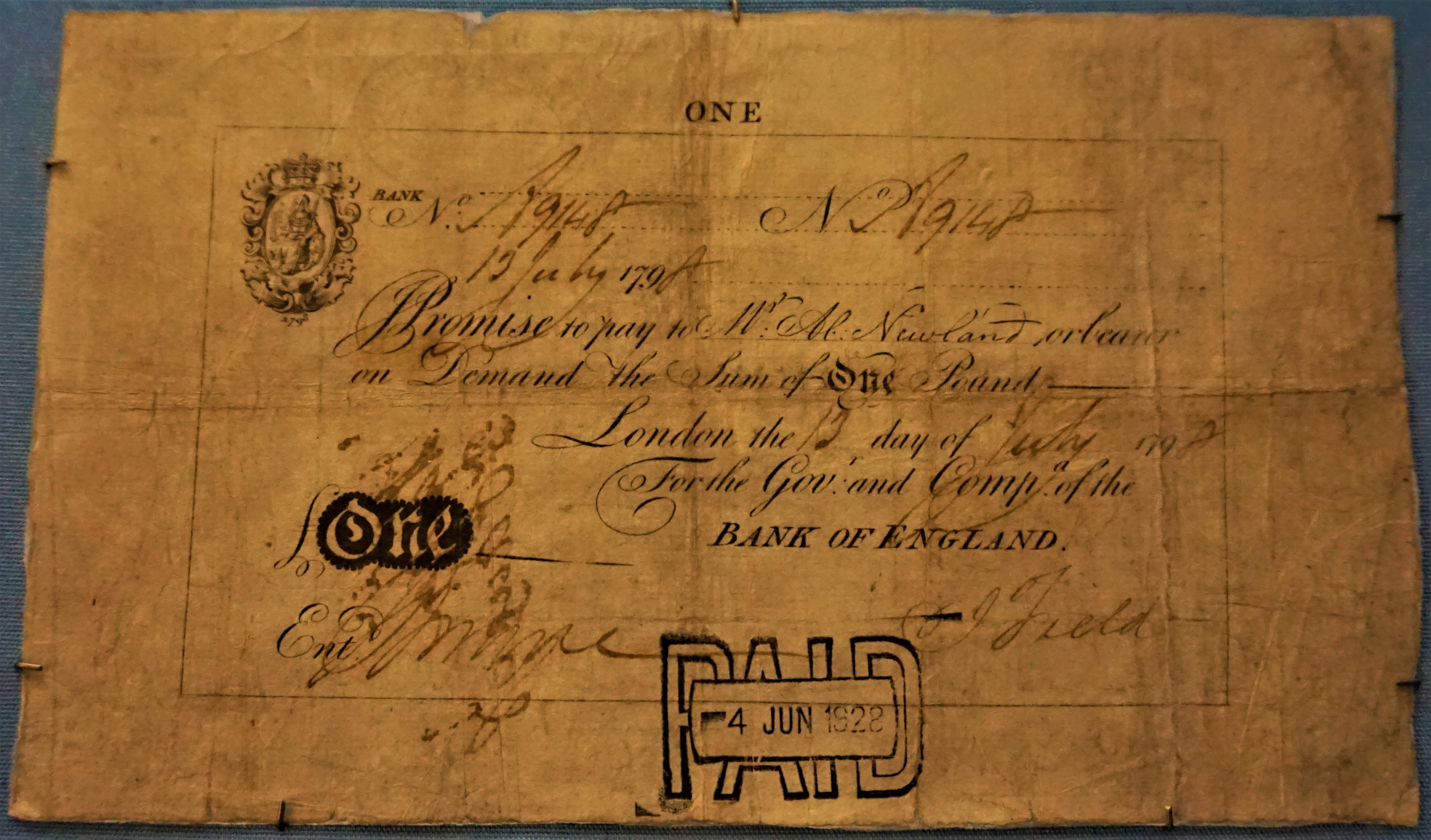
A£1 note dated 1797 (and marked as having been paid in 1928)

The bank has issued banknotes since 1694. Notes were originally hand-written; although they were partially printed from 1725 onwards, cashiers still had to sign each note and make them payable to someone. Notes were fully printed from 1855. Until 1928 all notes were "White Notes", printed in black and with a blank reverse. In the 18th and 19th centuries, White Notes were issued in £1 and £2 denominations. During the 20th century, White Notes were issued in denominations between £5 and £1000. Until the passing of the Gold Standard Act 1925 the bank was obliged to pay on demand the value of the note in gold coin to its bearer.

In 1724 the bank entered into a contract with Henry Portal of Whitchurch, Hampshire to provide high-quality paper for the printing of banknotes. The printing itself was undertaken by private printing firms; the copper plates were kept in the vault, and accompanied during their time at the printer by a bank clerk (who would record the number of copies made); once dry they would be delivered to the bank. The printing operation was brought within the bank's premises (albeit still under private contract) in 1791; in 1808 it was brought fully in-house.

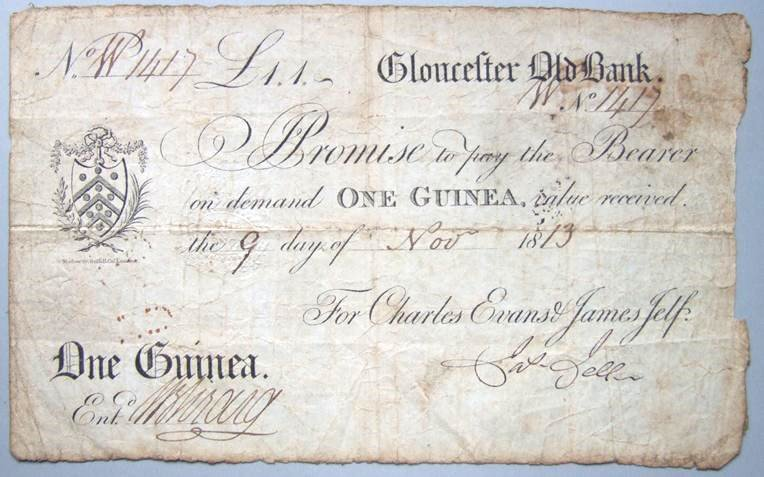
A One Guinea banknote, issued by the Gloucester Old Bank in 1813

Until the mid-19th century, commercial banks were allowed to issue their own banknotes, and notes issued by provincial banking companies were commonly in circulation. The Bank Charter Act 1844 began the process of restricting note issue to the bank; new banks were prohibited from issuing their own banknotes, and existing note-issuing banks were not permitted to expand their issue. As provincial banking companies merged to form larger banks, they lost their right to issue notes, and the English private banknote eventually disappeared, leaving the bank with a monopoly of note issues in England and Wales. The last private bank to issue its own banknotes in England and Wales was Fox, Fowler and Company in 1921. However, the limitations of the 1844 Act only affected banks in England and Wales, and today three commercial banks in Scotland and three in Northern Ireland continue to issue their own banknotes, regulated by the bank.

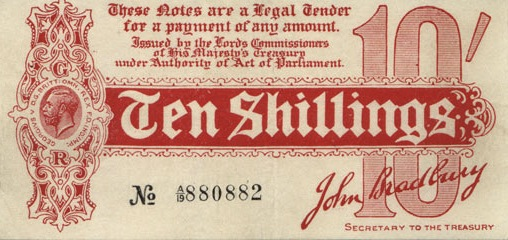
A ten-shilling Treasury note (dating from 1914), signed by John Bradbury

At the start of the First World War, the Currency and Bank Notes Act 1914 was passed, which granted temporary powers to HM Treasury for issuing banknotes to the values of £1 and 10/- (ten shillings). Treasury notes had full legal tender status and were not convertible into gold through the bank; they replaced the gold coin in circulation to prevent a run on sterling and to enable raw material purchases for armament production. These notes featured an image of King George V (Bank of England notes did not begin to display an image of the monarch until 1960). The wording on each note was:

UNITED KINGDOM OF GREAT BRITAIN AND IRELAND – Currency notes are Legal Tender for the payment of any amount – Issued by the Lords Commissioners of His Majesty's Treasury under the Authority of Act of Parliament (4 & 5 Geo. V c.14).

Treasury notes were issued until 1928 when the Currency and Bank Notes Act 1928 returned note-issuing powers to the banks. The Bank of England issued notes for ten shillings and one pound for the first time on 22 November 1928.

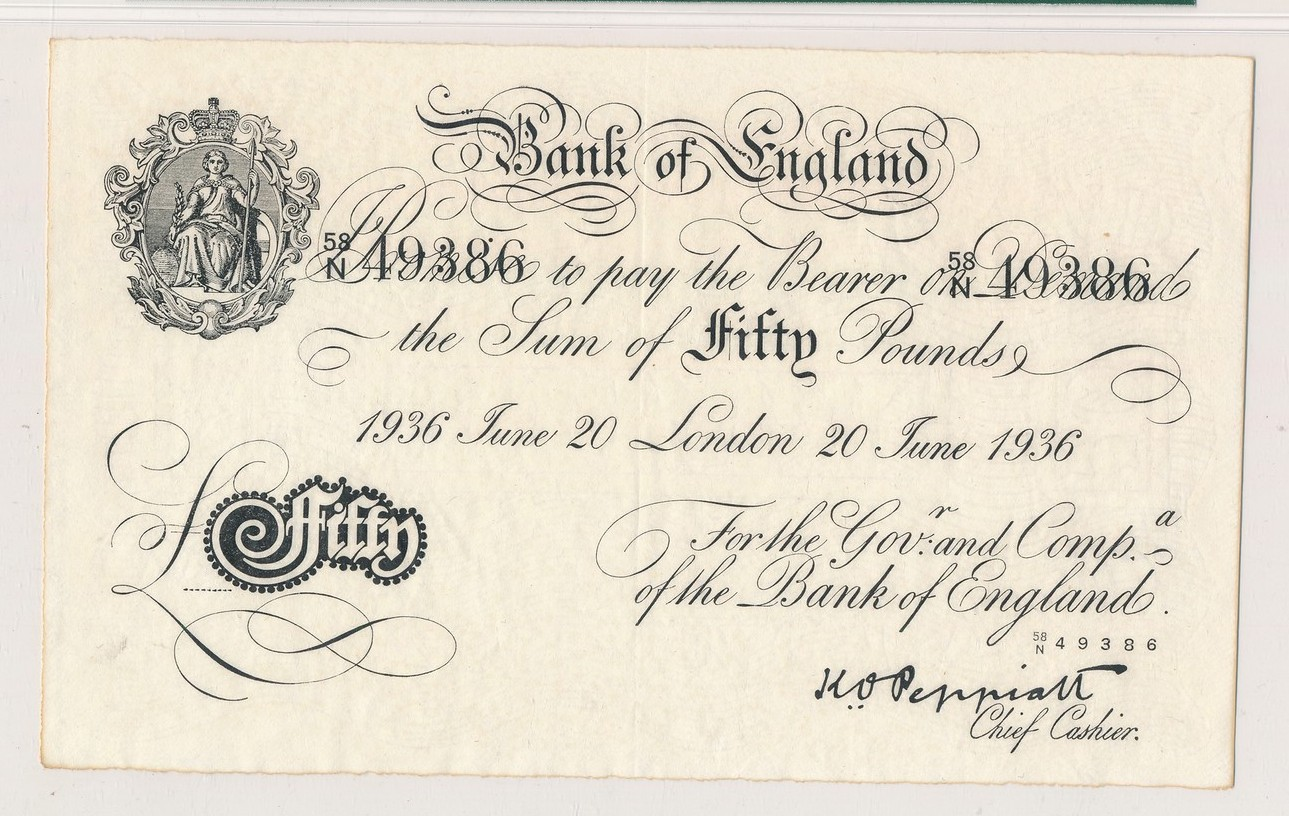
An 'Operation Bernhard' £50 note, forged by prisoners at Sachsenhausen concentration camp

During the Second World War, the German Operation Bernhard attempted to counterfeit denominations between £5 and £50, producing 500,000 notes each month in 1943. The original plan was to parachute the money into the UK in an attempt to destabilise the British economy, but it was found more useful to use the notes to pay German agents operating throughout Europe. Although most fell into Allied hands at the end of the war, forgeries frequently appeared for years afterward, which led banknote denominations above £5 to be removed from circulation.

In 2006, over £53 million in banknotes belonging to the bank was stolen from a depot in Tonbridge, Kent.

In 1917 the bank had moved its printing operation into St Luke's Printing Works, a former hospital; in 1958 it moved out to Debden. Modern banknotes are printed by contract with De La Rue Currency in Loughton, Essex.

In 2026, the Bank of England will issue a new series of banknotes, replacing historical figures with British wildlife. These images will be difficult to counterfeit while allowing for the celebration of nature in Britain.

== Branch offices ==
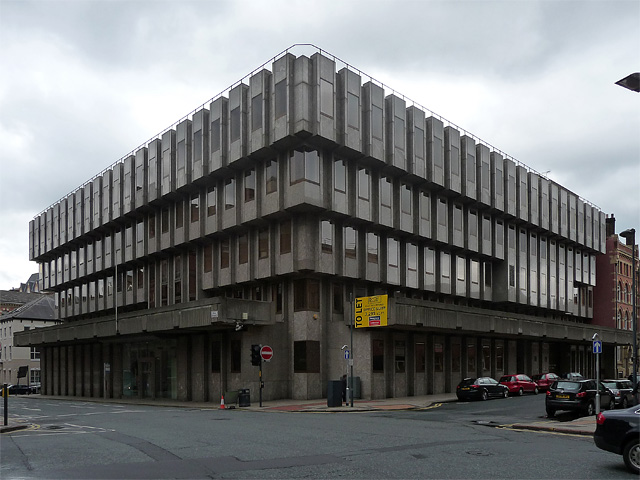
Bank of England, King Street, Leeds: one of a number of new brutalist branch buildings opened in the early 1970s.

For most of the nineteenth and twentieth centuries the bank had a number of branches in London and other English cities.

The first branches opened in 1826 (with impetus provided by the passing of the Country Bankers Act, which for the first time permitted the establishment of joint-stock banks outside London). The bank envisaged that the new network of branches would 'increase the circulation of Bank Notes, give the bank much more complete control over the whole paper circulation, and protect the bank against the competition of larger banking Companies'. Each branch was overseen by an Agent (a person of 'commercial knowledge, with local experience'). By 1829 there were eleven branches operating (ten in England and one in Wales). Some of the less profitable branches were relatively short-lived, but others continued operating into the 1990s.

In 1997 the five last remaining branches closed; the Agents, however, were retained, with a structure of Regional Agencies created (across the UK), some of which were based in former branch buildings.

=== List of Bank of England branches ===
Branch	Opened	Closed	Notes	Photo
Birmingham	1827	1997	Opened in Union Street (in the former banking house of Gibbins, Smith & Goode); moved in 1838 to the former Bank of Birmingham building on Bennetts Hill, and then into the former Staffordshire Joint Stock Bank premises at 1 Temple Row in 1890. In 1970 it moved into a new building (pictured) at No. 55.	
Bristol	1827	1997	Opened on Bridge Street. Moved into purpose-built premises on Broad Street (by C. R. Cockerell) in 1847; and thence to a new building on the High Street in 1963.	
Exeter	1827	1834	Opened in a house at 18 Southernhay Place; closed seven years later due to trading losses (the business was transferred to Plymouth).	
Gloucester	1826	1849	Opened in a former provincial bank premises (Turner, Turner & Morris) in Northgate Street; when it closed due to trading losses the business was taken over by the Bristol branch.	
Hull	1829	1939	Opened in Salthouse Lane (pictured); moved into a new building (by Philip Hardwick) in Whitefriargate in 1856. Closed after the premises were judged to be in poor repair and inconveniently located.	
Leeds	1827	1997	Opened in rented property in Boar Lane; relocated to Albion Street in 1835. The premises in Park Row (pictured), designed by Philip Hardwick, were opened in 1847; the branch moved into a new building in King Street in 1971.	
Leicester	1844	1872	Opened in 10 Gallowtree Gate (former premises of defunct banking house Clarke, Mitchell & Co.); when it closed due to trading losses the business was merged into that of the Birmingham branch.	
Liverpool	1827	1986	Opened in Hanover Street; moved in 1849 into purpose-built premises by C. R. Cockerell.	
London 'Law Courts' branch	1881	1975	Opened to facilitate links with the adjacent law courts and the Public Trustee office.	
London 'Western' branch	1855	1930	Operated largely as a commercial bank; when the bank was disengaging from such activity, the building (and much of the business) was sold to the Royal Bank of Scotland.	
Manchester	1826	1997	Opened in King Street. Moved into new premises designed by C. R. Cockerell on an adjacent site in 1847; then to a new building in Portland Street in 1971.	
Newcastle-upon-Tyne	1828	1997	Opened in two converted houses on Clavering Place (later demolished for railway improvements). Moved to a new building in Grey Street (the bank's first purpose-built branch) in 1838, where it remained until a new building was opened on Pilgrim Street in 1971.	
Norwich	1829	1852	Closed due to trading losses.	
Plymouth	1834	1949	Opened to facilitate supply of money to the Royal Navy Dockyards. (The branch building, in George Street, was bomb-damaged in the Second World War and subsequently closed).	
Portsmouth	1834	1914	Opened in the High Street to facilitate supply of money to the Naval Dockyards. Closed eighty years later due to declining business (cash by this time being more easily procured from London).	
Southampton	1940	1986	Opened on the High Street (in premises designed by A. V. Heal) to facilitate the shipping of gold and currency, as well as to serve the south of England.	
Swansea	1826	1859	Housed in the 'Old Bank' premises of Gibbins & Eaton in Temple Street, this was the only branch to have opened outside England. It closed due to trading losses and business was transferred to the Bristol branch.	

== Governance of the Bank of England ==
=== Governors ===
Following is a list of the governors of the Bank of England since the beginning of the 20th century:

Name	Period
Samuel Gladstone	1899–1901
Augustus Prevost	1901–1903
Samuel Morley	1903–1905
Alexander Wallace	1905–1907
William Campbell	1907–1909
Reginald Eden Johnston	1909–1911
Alfred Cole	1911–1913
Walter Cunliffe	1913–1918
Brien Cokayne	1918–1920
Montagu Norman	1920–1944
Thomas Catto	1944–1949
Cameron Cobbold	1949–1961
Rowland Baring (3rd Earl of Cromer)	1961–1966
Leslie O'Brien	1966–1973
Gordon Richardson	1973–1983
Robert Leigh-Pemberton	1983–1993
Edward George	1993–2003
Mervyn King	2003–2013
Mark Carney	2013–2020
Andrew Bailey	2020–present

=== Court of Directors ===
The Court of Directors is a unitary board that is responsible for setting the organisation's strategy and budget and making key decisions on resourcing and appointments. It consists of five executive members from the bank (the Governor and the four Deputy Governors, each of whom oversees a different area of the bank's work), plus up to 9 non-executive members, all of whom are appointed by the Crown. The Chancellor selects the Chairman of the Court from among the non-executive members. The Court is required to meet at least seven times a year.

The Governor serves for a period of eight years, the Deputy Governors for five years, and the non-executive members for up to four years.

Court of Directors (2024)
Name	Function
David Roberts	Chair, Court of Directors
Andrew Bailey	Governor, Bank of England
Benjamin Broadbent	Deputy Governor, Monetary Policy
Sarah Breeden	Deputy Governor, Financial Stability
Sam Woods	Deputy Governor, Prudential Regulation and Chief Executive of the Prudential Regulation Authority
Sir Dave Ramsden	Deputy Governor, Markets and Banking
Jonathan Bewes	Non-Executive Director
Sabine Chalmers	Non-Executive Director
Jitesh Gadhia	Non-Executive Director
Anne Glover	Non-Executive Director
Sir Ron Kalifa	Non-Executive Director and Senior Independent Director
Diana Noble	Non-Executive Director and Deputy Chair
Frances O'Grady	Non-Executive Director
Tom Shropshire	Non-Executive Director

=== Other staff ===
The Secretary of the Bank of England is today responsible for the banks governance and ethics: 'He is responsible for ensuring the organisation is well run and advises our Court of Directors [...] He is also our conflicts officer and supports the Government when it makes appointments to our policy committees and Court of Directors'.

Since 2013, the bank has had a chief operating officer (COO) with the status and remuneration of a Deputy Governor. As of 2024, the bank's COO is Ben Stimson; he is responsible for the day-to-day operations of the bank, including Human Resources, Property, IT and Security. In March 2025, the Bank of England appointed Sarah John as its new Chief Operating Officer. John previously served as the Bank's Chief Cashier.

Some twenty executive directors work alongside the Governors, forming 'the wider executive management team'. Among their number are the bank's chief economist (Huw Pill since 2021), and chief cashier.

== See also ==
- List of British currencies
- Bank of England Act
- Coins of the pound sterling
- Financial Sanctions Unit
- Commonwealth banknote-issuing institutions
- Bank of England Museum
- Deputy Governor of the Bank of England
- List of directors of the Bank of England
- List of central banks
- Chief Cashiers of the Bank of England
