= St Luke's Hospital for Lunatics =

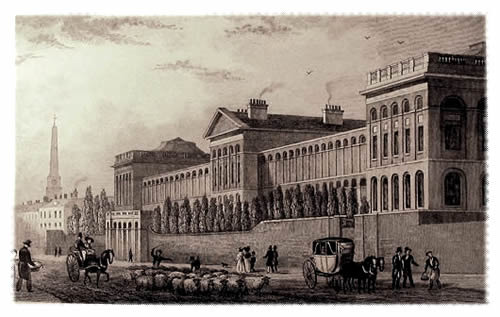
- St Luke's Hospital for Lunatics on Old Street London. The obelisk spire of St Luke's Church can be seen in the background.

- Location within Islington

Geography
- Location: St Luke's, Islington, London, England
- Coordinates: 51°31′32″N 0°5′23″W

Organisation
- Care system: NHS
- Type: Mental health

History
- Founded: 1751
- Closed: 2011

Links
- Lists: Hospitals in England

St Luke's Hospital for Lunatics was founded in London in 1751 for the treatment of incurable pauper lunatics by a group of philanthropic apothecaries and others. It was the second public institution in London created to look after mentally ill people, after the Hospital of St Mary of Bethlem (Bedlam), founded in 1246.

== History ==
1896 map of Old Street showing a plan of the hospital.

The first chief physician was Dr William Battie who was renowned as 'an eccentric humorist'. He believed 'the patients of this hospital shall not be exposed to publick view.' Medical treatment consisted of cold plunge baths to shake lunatics out of their insanity. A system of non-restraint was professed, however manacles and other restraints were sometimes used.

The hospital was originally housed in a converted foundry in Windmill Street, Upper Moorfields, close to Bedlam. It was designed by George Dance the Elder in 1750–01; after his death his son George Dance the Younger succeeded him as surveyor to the hospital. It was originally built for 25 patients, but was enlarged and by 1771 was overcrowded. A decision was made to build a larger hospital on a new site. The design was put out to competition, which was a novelty at the time. None of the competition entries were successful however, and Dance was asked to design the new building.

In 1786 the hospital moved to Dance's purpose-built premises on Old Street, between Bath St and what is now the City Road roundabout. The building had a magnificent frontage of clamp brick, 500 feet (150 m) long, which had a central entrance, with the male wards to the left and female wards to the right. The building contained single cells for 300 patients, each with small windows set high in the wall, no heating, and loose straw on wooden bedsteads.

By 1865 it had a population of 150 to 160 patients, taken from the middle classes, its original purpose of supporting paupers having been abandoned. The proportion of cures at St Luke's was 67 to 70 per cent compared to that of only 15 per cent at pauper lunatic asylums .

Behind the main building were two gardens for the exercise of the less disturbed inmates, one for men and another for women. More dangerous residents were kept inside, or in their cells. The treatment regime consisted of cold plunge baths, and a focus on the gastrointestinal system with the administration of anti-spasmodics, emetics (to induce vomiting) and purgatives.

All patients were transferred to other institutions or their homes in 1916, and the buildings were acquired by the Bank of England to become the St Luke's Printing Works, used for printing bank notes until the early 1950s. The building was demolished in 1963.

In 1922 it was suggested that a psychiatric unit should be instituted by the original St Luke's charity in cooperation with a general hospital. This led to the funding by the charity of both an out-patient clinic and a psychiatric in-patient ward at the Middlesex Hospital. A new St Luke's, the third, was opened at Woodside Avenue, Muswell Hill, in 1930 by Princess Helena Victoria. This was variously known as Woodside Nerve Hospital, St Luke's Woodside Hospital for Functional Nervous Disorders and from 1948 as St Luke's Woodside.

In 2011 the NHS Trust responsible for St Luke's Woodside, Camden and Islington NHS Foundation Trust, successively closed all wards, leaving open only an occupational therapy unit and effecting closure by stealth without the consultation process required of formal closure proposals. The site was then put up for sale.

== Notable patients ==
- The poet Christopher Smart (1722–1771) was confined in St Luke's from 1757 to 1758.
- Jonathan Martin, brother of John Martin (1789–1854), the English Romantic painter. Confined 1829 until his death in 1838 for setting fire to York Minster.
- Leonard Cheshire, Second World War RAF Group Captain and humanitarian, was an inpatient at St Luke's after his discharge from the RAF in 1946.

== See also ==
- List of demolished buildings and structures in London
