= St Luke's Printing Works =

St Luke's Printing Works was the owned by the Bank of England for printing bank notes from 1917 to 1958. It occupied the site of the former St Luke's Hospital for Lunatics, an asylum rebuilt in 1782–1784 by George Dance the Younger. The building was damaged by the Blitz of 1940, and the printing works were relocated in 1958 to Debden, Essex.
