= Michael Godfrey =

English merchant and financier

- Born: 22 February 1658
- Died: 1695 (aged 36–37); Namur
- Relatives: Sir Edmund Berry Godfrey (uncle)

Michael Godfrey (22 February 1658 – 1695) was an English merchant and financier, who was one of the founders and the first deputy governor of the Bank of England.

== Family ==
Godfrey was the eldest son of Michael Godfrey (1624–1689), merchant, of London and Woodford, Essex, and his wife, Anne Mary Chamberlain. He was the nephew of Sir Edmund Berry Godfrey, a magistrate who was murdered in 1678 after receiving Titus Oates’s depositions concerning the Popish plot and foreman of the grand jury that found a true bill against Edward Fitzharris for high treason.

== Career ==
Michael Godfrey and his brother Peter Godfrey were merchants, and their father predicted that their speculations would speedily ‘bring into hotchpott’ the whole of their ample fortunes. Godfrey supported William Paterson in the establishment of the Bank of England in 1694. He was rewarded by being elected as the first deputy governor of the bank. Soon afterwards, he published a pamphlet entitled 'A Short Account of the Bank of England'. On 15 August 1694, Godfrey was chosen as one of fifteen persons to prepare bylaws for the new bank.

== Death ==
At a general court held on 16 May 1695, at which Peter Godfrey was elected a director, the bank resolved to establish a branch at Antwerp in order to coin money to pay the troops in Flanders. Deputy-governors Sir James Houblon, Sir William Scawen, and Michael Godfrey were therefore appointed to go thither ‘to methodise the same, his majesty and the elector of Bavaria having agreed there too’.

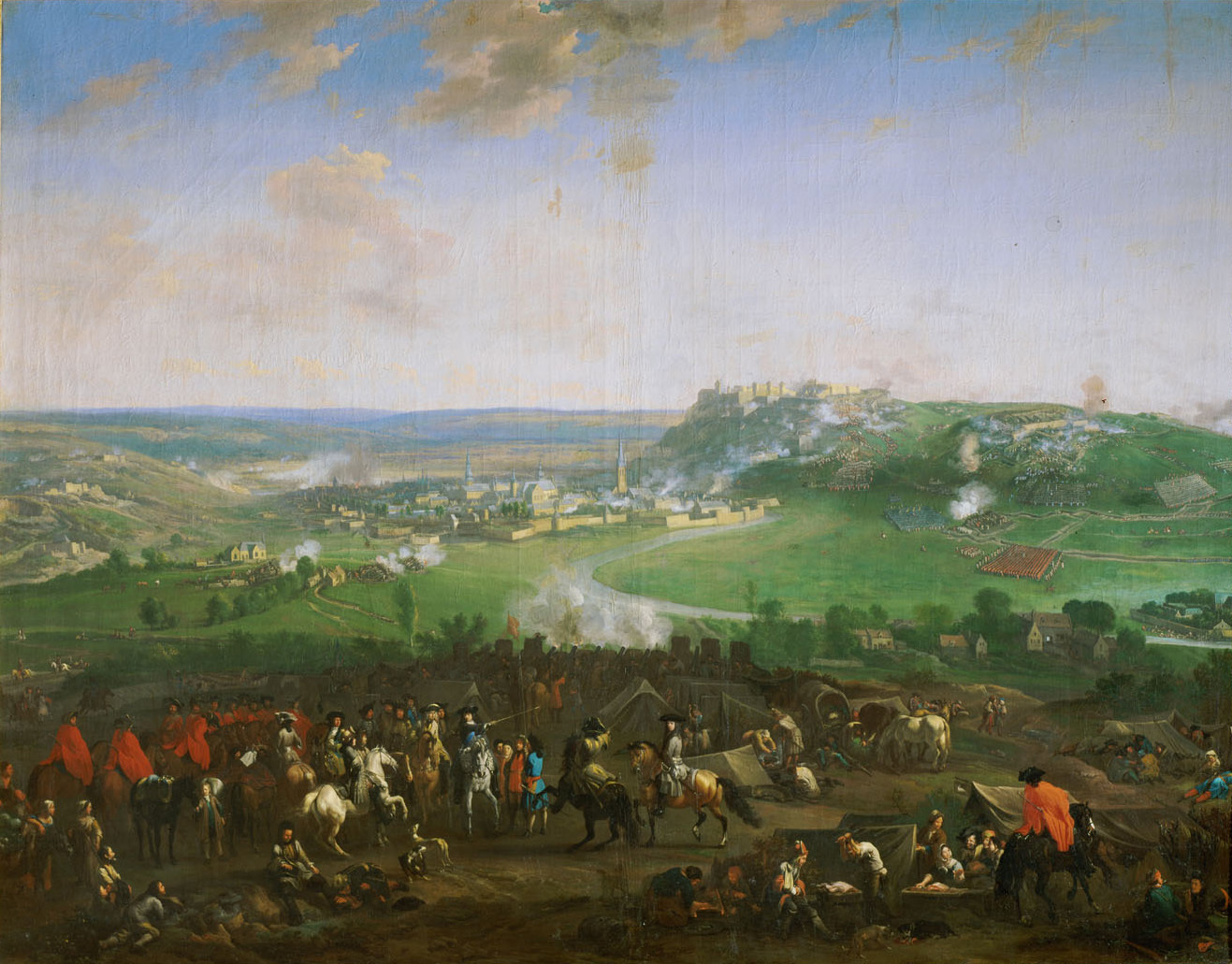
Siege of Namur (1695)

On their arrival at Namur, then besieged by William, the king invited them to dinner in his tent. They went out of curiosity into the trenches, where a cannon-ball from the works of the besieged killed Godfrey as he stood near the king on 17 July 1695.

'Being an eminent merchant,' writes Luttrell, 'he is much lamented; this news has abated the actions of the bank by 2 percent." He was unmarried and was buried near his father in the church of St. Swithin, Walbrook, where his mother erected a tablet to his memory.

== Publications ==
- A Short Account Of The Bank Of England by Michael Godfrey (1695)
