= City of London Police Museum =

Museum in London, England

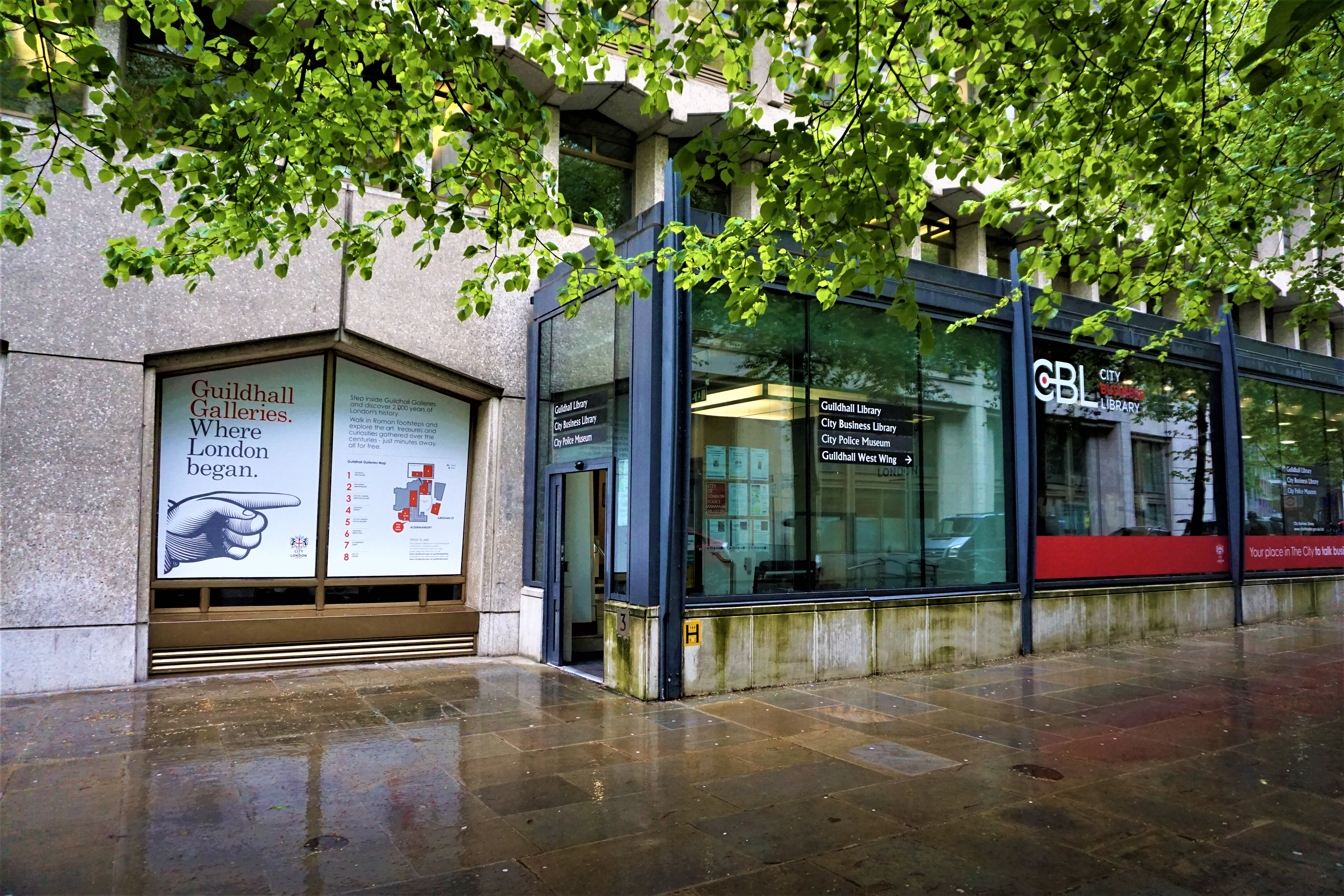
Exterior of the Guildhall where the City of London Police Museum is located.

The City of London Police Museum was a museum housed at the Guildhall, City of London. It treated the history of the City of London Police. Exhibits included uniforms, Victorian-era police equipment and artefacts, communication devices, World War II displays, and exhibits about Jack the Ripper and other famous murder cases.

The museum relocated in November 2016 to the space formerly used by the Clockmakers' Museum, next to the Guildhall Library. The new museum was funded by a £90,000 Heritage Lottery Fund grant. It was closed to become a COVID testing centre during the COVID-19 pandemic on the understanding that it would reopen there when possible, and the COLP Authority Board decided to do so on 2 May 2023
