= Richards of Aberdeen =

- Company type: Public
- Industry: Textiles
- Founded: 1962

Richards of Aberdeen was a textile company based in the Hutcheon Street area of Aberdeen, Scotland.

== History ==
The company that became Richards had its origins in the early 19th century. It was founded by John Maberly. He brought in new finance with John Baker Richards as a partner, in 1825, trading as Maberly & Co. James William Freshfield and Robert Langford became involved as property trustees, in 1829.

Maberly during the 1820s introduced steam power in the linen factories; but ran into trouble in financial operations. He was in the end bankrupted by 1832. Others brought into the firm included William Leader (died 1828), to whose son John Temple Leader debts owed by Maberly passed. The name of the firm became Richards & Co. from 1831, and that year Lancelot Holland became involved.

Henry Lancelot Holland (1808–1893) joined Richards & Co. in 1837. He became one of the partners, with his father Lancelot Holland, John Temple Leader, George Edwards and others. He was later head of the company.

At its height, Richard had its Broadford Works in Aberdeen; also spinning and power looms at Montrose, and bleachfields at Rubislaw and Craigo. Broadford Works was the oldest iron-frame mill in Scotland, and in the end the last remaining textile mill in Aberdeen. It was also one of the principal employers there with more than 3,000 people working in the mill in the early 20th century.

Richards of Aberdeen became a public limited company in 1898. With the decline in traditional flax spinning activities, in the mid-1960s the company embarked upon a programme of development of synthetic yarn ranges which it maintained with few changes until the 21st century.

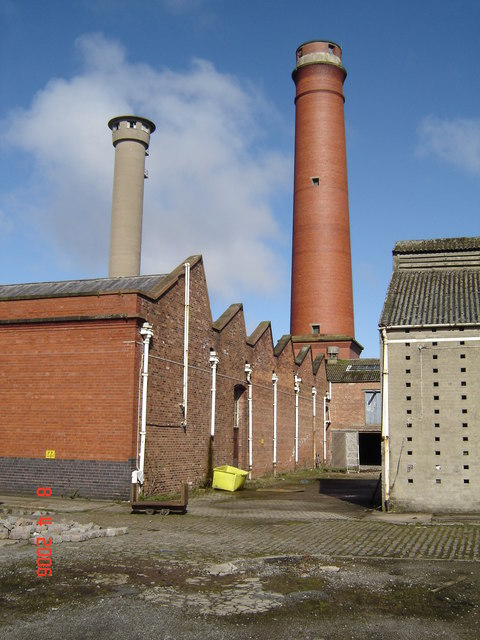
Broadford Works, Aberdeen, 2006 photograph

== 2004 closure ==
Richards was purchased in 2002 by Ian Suttie, chief executive of First Oil, while facing receivership. In 2003 the company moved its headquarters to the outskirts of Aberdeen, with assistance from Aberdeen City Council.

Fifty-two job losses were announced at the start of November 2004, despite the employment of 80 new staff in May of that year. Soon the entire remaining workforce of 196 was made redundant. Many had been at the mill for their entire working lives. Workers were angered not only by news of the closure itself but by the way they discovered what had happened: payments simply stopped arriving in their bank accounts. Another indicator came when supplies ceased to arrive at the site. Aside from global economic conditions, one of the main factors causing the closure was the company pension scheme which by November 2004 faced a shortfall of £5m.

== Post Closure ==
The pension scheme continues to cause problems for the mill's former employees and there are calls to wind up the plan as soon as possible.

== Future plans ==
The mill is currently under consideration for possible conversion into an 'urban village' of 398 homes, many of which would be in historical listed buildings which require careful planning considerations before any work can commence.

== Gallery ==
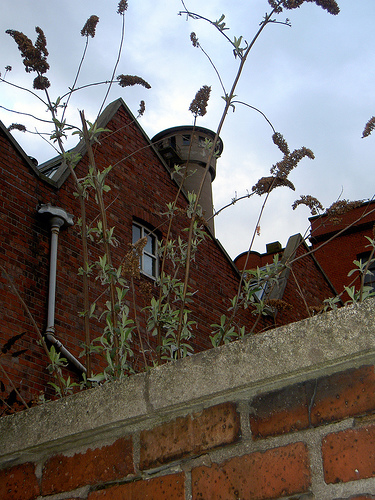
Richards mill, in March 2006

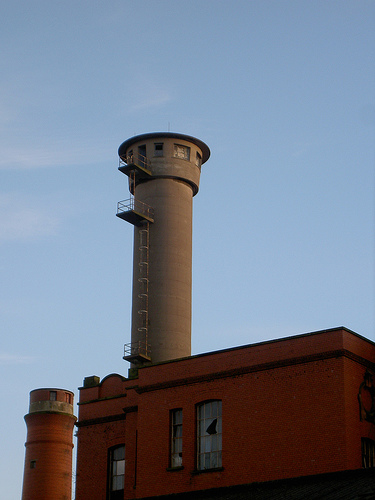
The mill and its famous hose tower, one year after closure

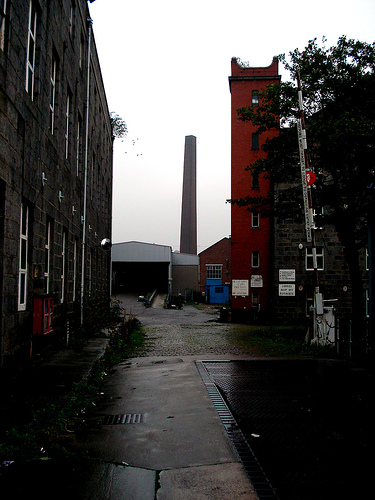
The main mill entrance in late 2006
