= Henry Holland =

Henry Holland may refer to:

- Henry Holland, 3rd Duke of Exeter (1430–1475), Lancastrian leader during the Wars of the Roses
- Henry Holland (priest) (1556–1603), English writer on witchcraft
- Henry Holland (printer) (1583–1650?), English bookseller and printer
- Henry Holland (architect) (1745–1806), Georgian architect
- Sir Henry Holland, 1st Baronet (1788–1873), physician and travel writer
- Henry Holland (cricketer) (1791–1853), Hampshire cricketer
- Henry Holland, 1st Viscount Knutsford (1825–1914), politician
- Henry Scott Holland (1847–1918), English theologian and author; Canon of St Paul's Cathedral
- Henry Holland (mayor) (1859–1944), mayor of Christchurch and Reform Party member of parliament, New Zealand
- Harry Holland (Henry Edmund Holland, 1868–1933), Australian-born newspaper owner and politician who relocated to New Zealand
- Henry Holland (missionary) (1875–1965), British Christian medical missionary who travelled to the Indian subcontinent to provide ophthalmologic surgery and care
- Henry F. Holland (1912–1962), U.S. Assistant Secretary of State for Inter-American Affairs, 1954–1956
- Harry Holland (artist) (born 1941), British painter
- Henry Holland (fashion designer) (born 1983), British fashion designer
- Henry Lancelot Holland, Governor of the Bank of England, 1865–1867
