= Caudwell =

Caudwell may refer to:

== People ==
- Christopher Caudwell (1907–1937), pseudonym of Christopher St John Sprigg, British Marxist writer and activist
- Don Caudwell (1929–2006), Australian rules footballer
- Job Caudwell (1820–1908), English publisher, bookseller and activist
- John David Caudwell (born 1952), English Billionaire businessman
- Sarah Caudwell (1939–2000), pseudonym of Sarah Cockburn, British barrister and writer
