= Putney Methodist Church =

Church in Putney, London, England

Coordinates: 51.462044°N 0.222161°W

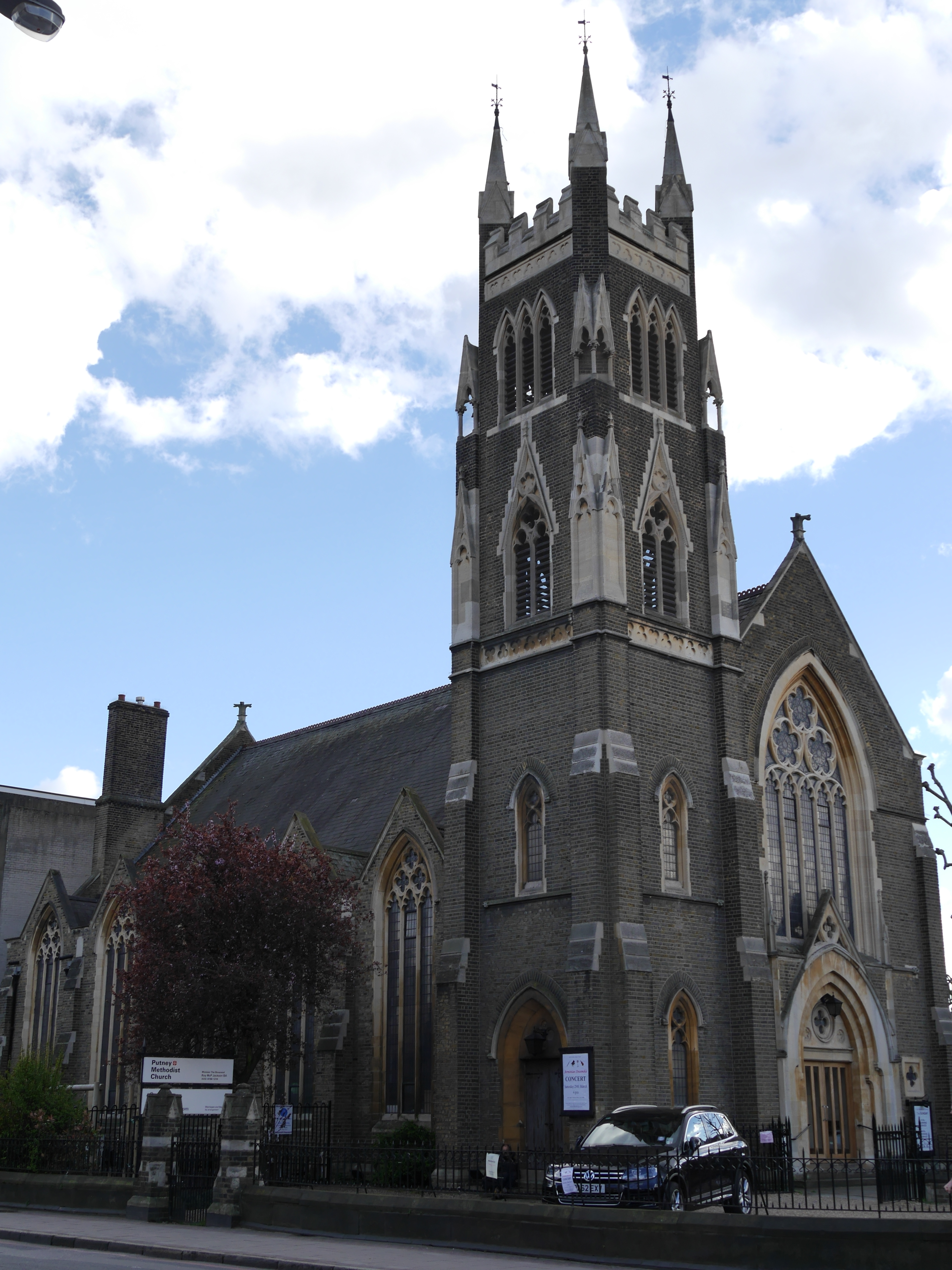
Putney Methodist Church from Upper Richmond road

Putney Methodist Church is a Grade II listed church in Putney, in the London Borough of Wandsworth.

== Location ==
The church is on the south side of the Upper Richmond Road, at the corner with Gwendolen avenue, at SW15 6SN.

== History ==
The site was originally obtained from local politician John Temple Leader who donated land for Leader's Gardens elsewhere in Putney, and whose father William Leader is buried closeby at Putney Old Burial Ground. The previous church building opened on 13 October 1870, a new building in a Gothic style then opened on 4 May 1882, after being granted £1000 by philanthropist Sir Francis Lycett; a separate schoolroom building opened in 1896.

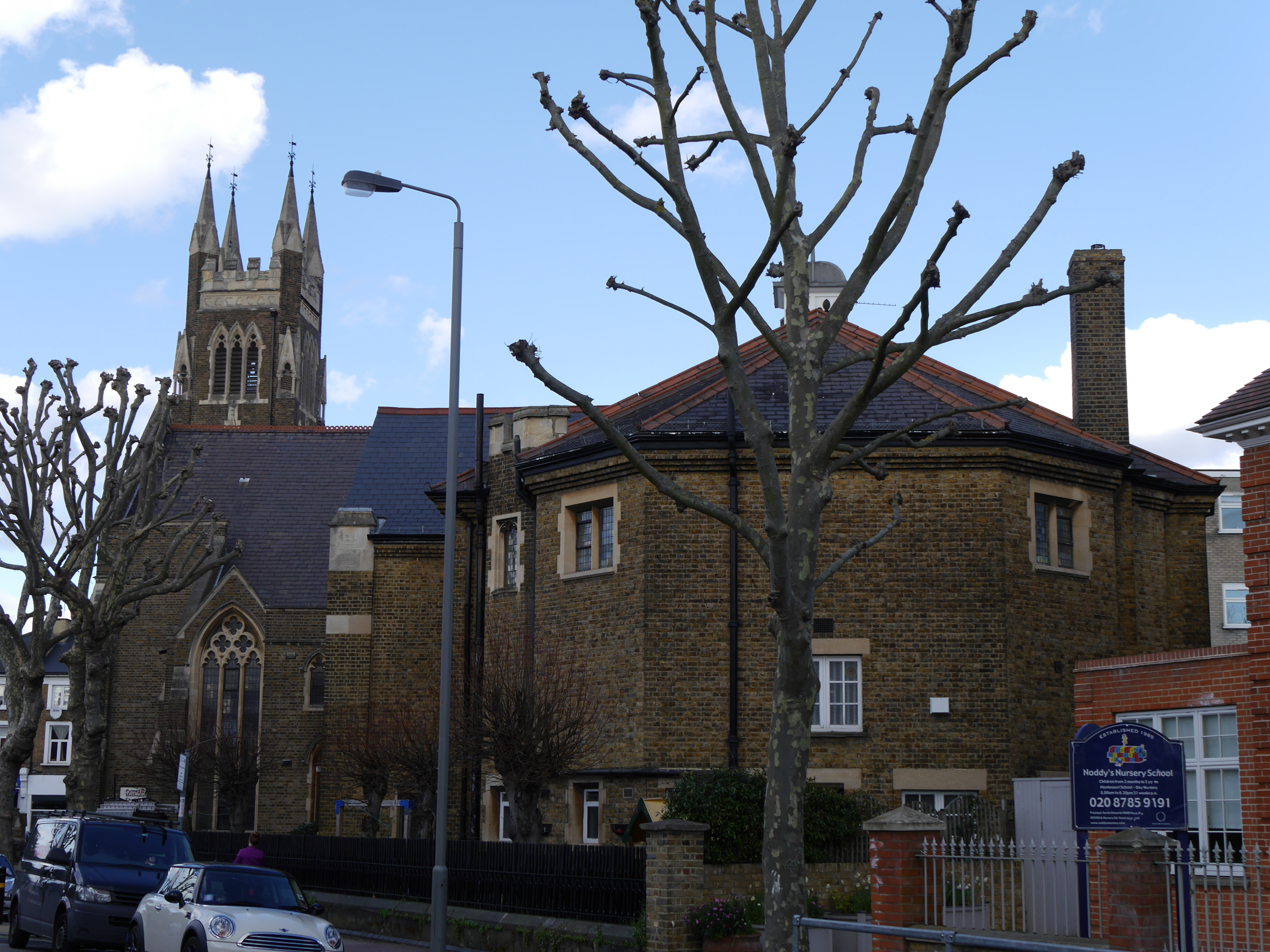
Putney Methodist Church from Gwendolen Avenue, showing schoolroom building

The re-union of the Methodist Church in 1932 changed the name of the church from 'Putney Wesleyan Methodist Church' to 'Putney Methodist Church'.

The building was damaged beyond repair in the Second World War on 18 June 1944, by a V1 flying bomb that fell on the nearby railway bridge on Charlwood road. The church closed for eight years, the building was rebuilt and then rededicated on 6 September 1952.

The church is a registered charity for "Religious Activities in Putney, London", the building is used as a polling station in UK local and general elections.
