= Putney Old Burial Ground =

Public park and old cemetery in Putney, London

Coordinates: 51.4566988°N 0.2032697°W

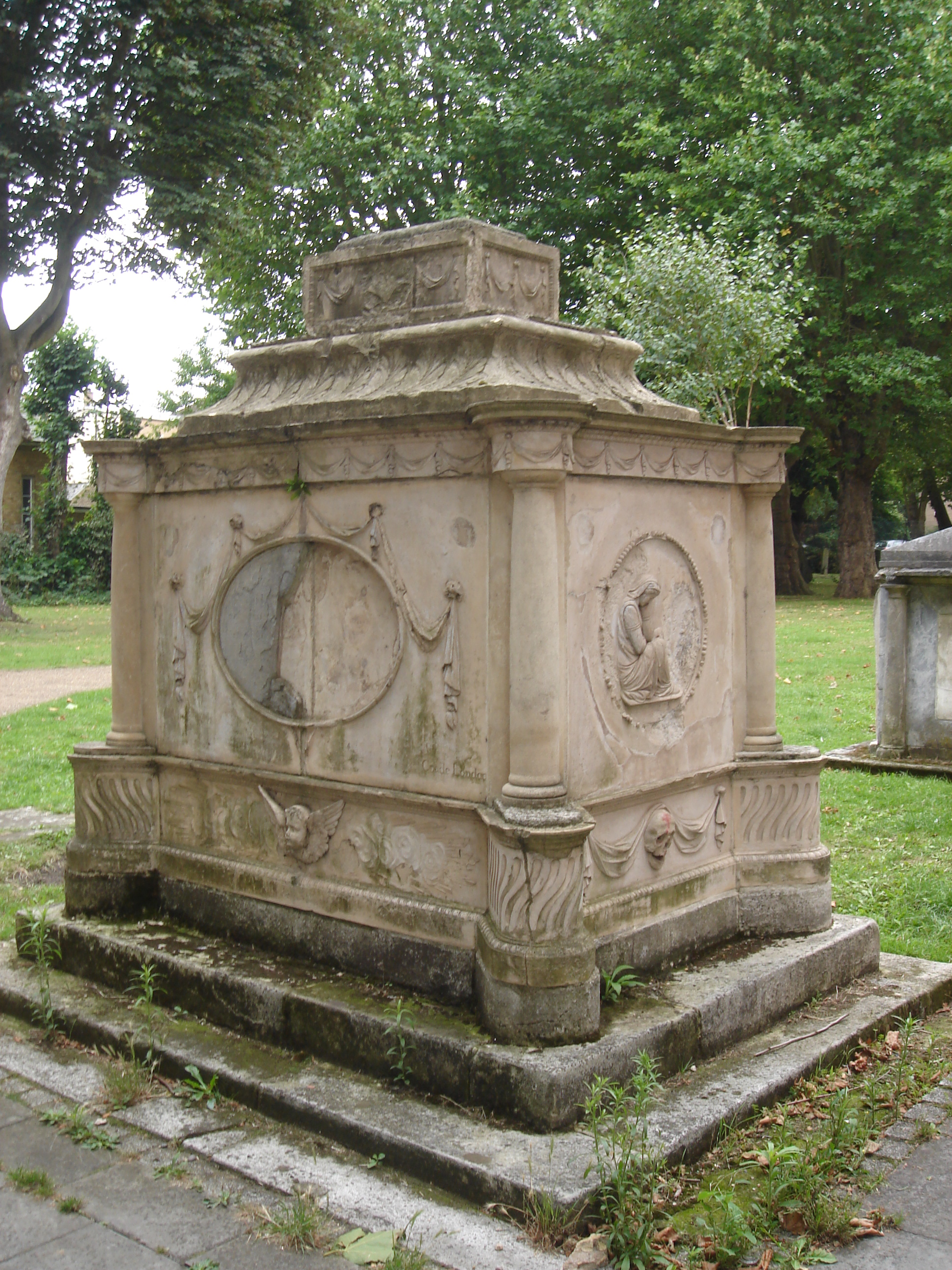
Tomb of Harriet Thomson, St Mary's Burial Ground, Putney, London

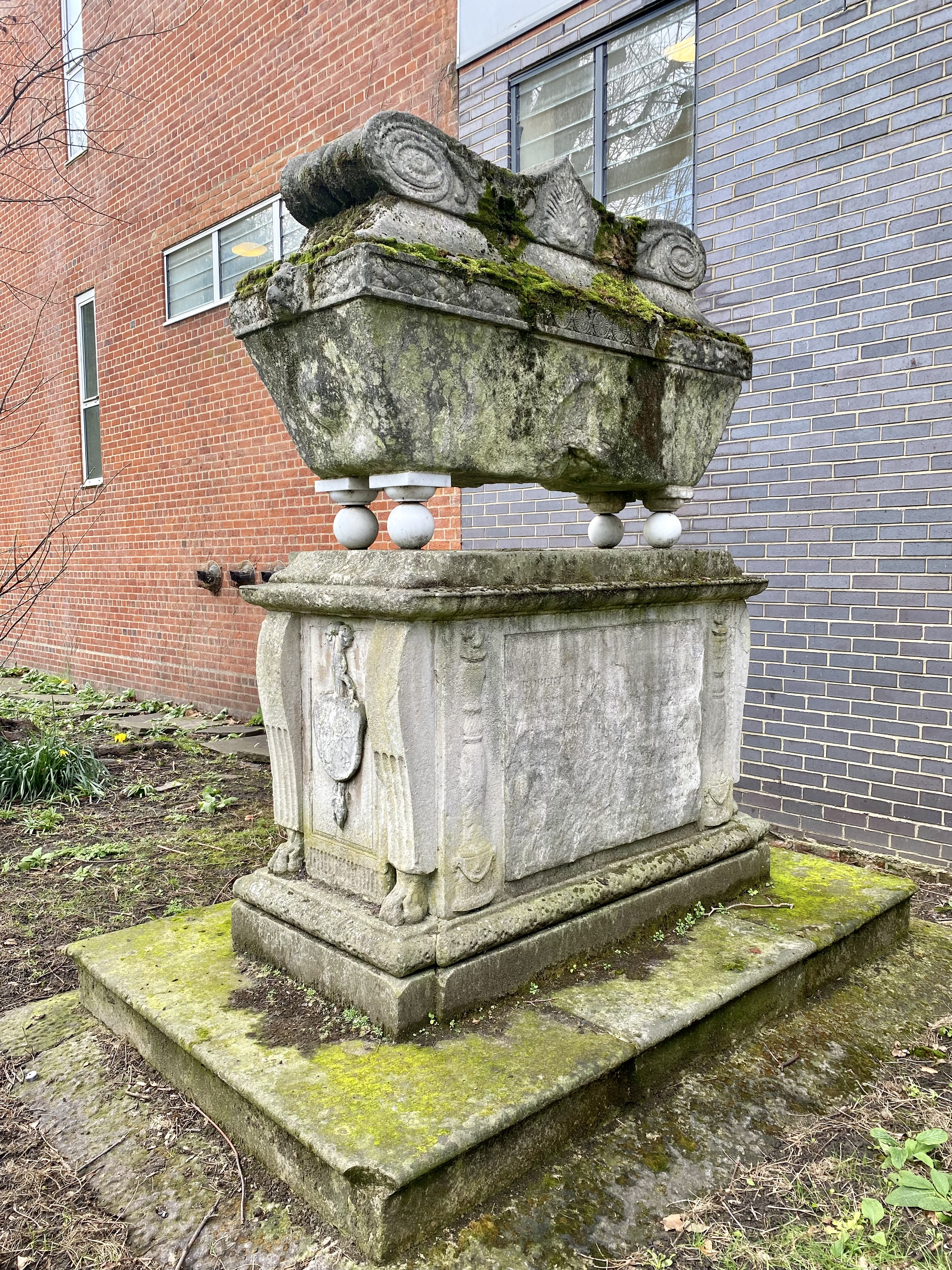
Tomb of Robert Wood

Putney Old Burial Ground is a public urban park and former cemetery in the London Borough of Wandsworth near Putney town centre.

== Geography ==
The park has an area of 0.34ha and can be entered from Upper Richmond road on the north side of the park. Percy Laurie House residential building and the Daley Fitness gym are on the west side, All Saints Liberal Catholic Church and Putney Arts Theatre are on the East side, and Nursery close is on the south side.

The park is part of the West Putney Conservation Area and the Wandsworth Archaeological Priority Area, it is maintained by Wandsworth Borough Council.

== History ==
The cemetery was established in 1763 on land donated by Revd Roger Pettiward, to provide additional burial space for St Mary's Church. The cemetery closed for burials in 1854 and was converted for use as a public garden which opened in 1886. In 2005 refurbishment work was carried out on railings, seats and paths, in 2008 Wandsworth Borough Council ran a £43,000 project to restore some of the 18th century tombs.

== Features and notable burials ==
The gates and fence at the park entrance are original and made of iron and there is a small mortuary building.

The 18th century tombs include four which are Grade II listed: the table tomb at the park entrance, the tomb of archaeologist Robert Wood (1717–1771), merchant banker Stratford Canning (1744–1787) and Joseph Lucas (c. 1758–1833).

There are also the graves of 18th century novelist Harriet Thomson (c. 1719–1787) made of coade stone, the grave of William Leader (1767–1828), whose son John Temple Leader gave land for Leader's Gardens park elsewhere in Putney, and the grave of the Rev. Richard St. Aubyn (1807–1849) who was son of Sir John St Aubyn.

== Wildlife ==
The park is a Site of Local Importance for Nature Conservation. The grassland between the graves has wildflowers and there are six mature London plane trees which provide shade for ferns and mosses. Stag Beetles have been recorded in the park

== Amenities ==
There is some seating in the park but there are no public toilets, dogs are not allowed in the park. The nearby Putney Arts Theatre stages open air productions in the park.

== Transport ==
The park is served by Transport for London buses 74 and 337 which stop on the Upper Richmond road, Putney railway station (Southwestern Railway) is a 5 minute walk from the park. The Santander Cycles Putney Rail Station docking station is a 5 minute walk from the park.
