= Putney Pocket Park =

Pocket park in London, United Kingdom

Coordinates: 51.462326°N 0.221469°W

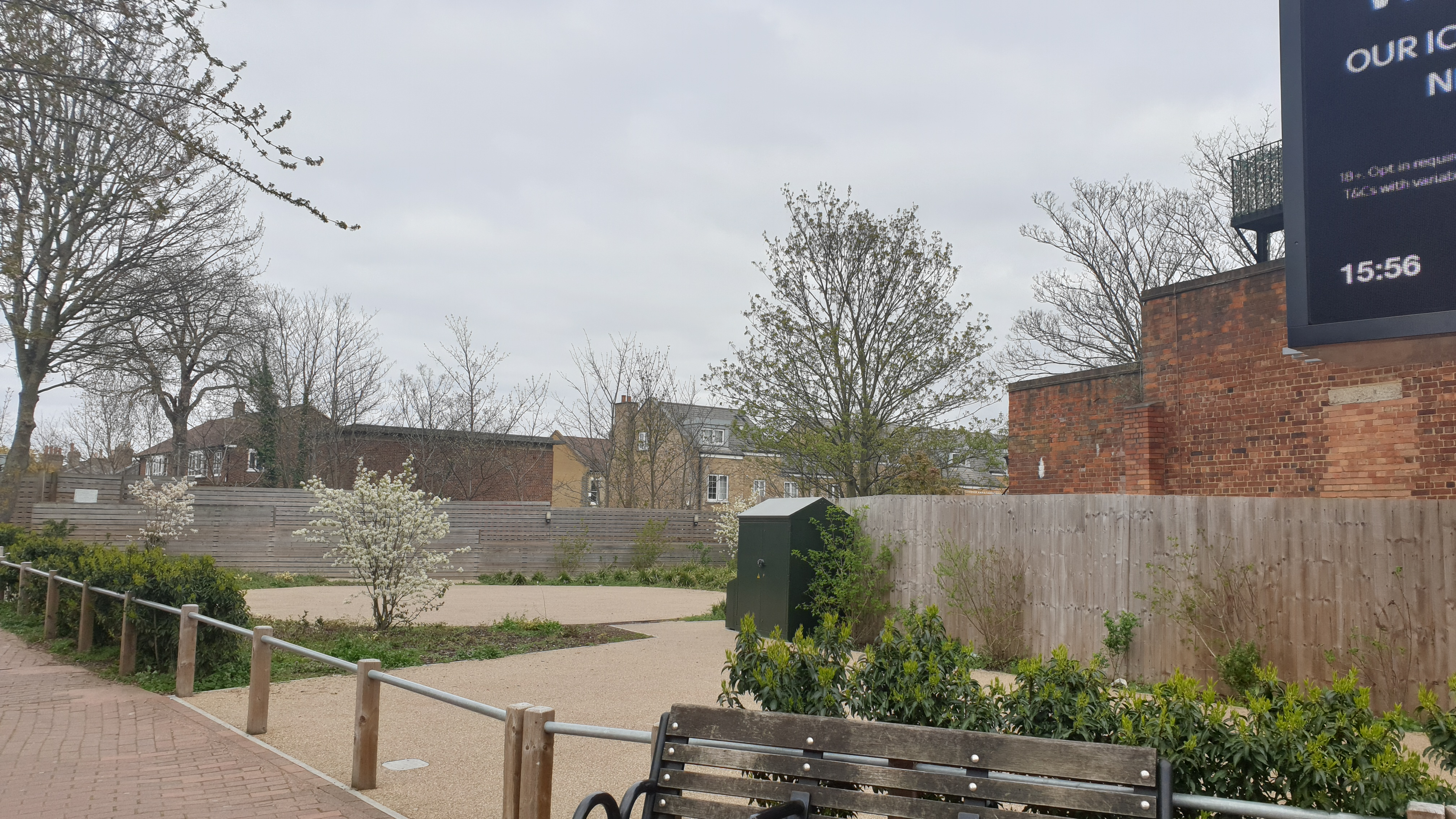
Overview of Putney Pocket Park

Putney Pocket Park is a public pocket park in the London Borough of Wandsworth near to Putney town centre.

== Geography ==
The park has an area of 560 square metres and lies on the eastern side of the corner of Charlwood road and the Upper Richmond road. The railway line between Barnes and Putney runs along the north side, with access to the Jordan Court residential building and there are shops on the east side. Putney Methodist Church lies opposite on Upper Richmond road to the park. The park is on the edge of the Charlwood Road and Lifford Street Conservation Area.

== History ==
There were buildings on the site until the Second World War, when a V-1 rocket fell on the nearby railway bridge in June 1944. The London County Council Bomb Damage Map (1945) shows the buildings on the corner were damaged beyond repair and the site then remained vacant.

In 2019 the site was landscaped by the Swann Group following landscaping design plans by local garden designer Carolyn Singer. The pocket park was opened in August 2019, with representatives from JCDecaux who have an advertising tower on the site, Wandsworth Borough Council and the landscape designer.

In 2020 planning permission was submitted for a two to four storey residential building with commercial units, the application was refused in 2021 by Wandsworth Borough Council.

In 2022 park owners JCDecaux entered into a partnership with local civic society the Putney Society, aiming 'to replant areas of the parklet to provide year-round interest'.

== Features ==
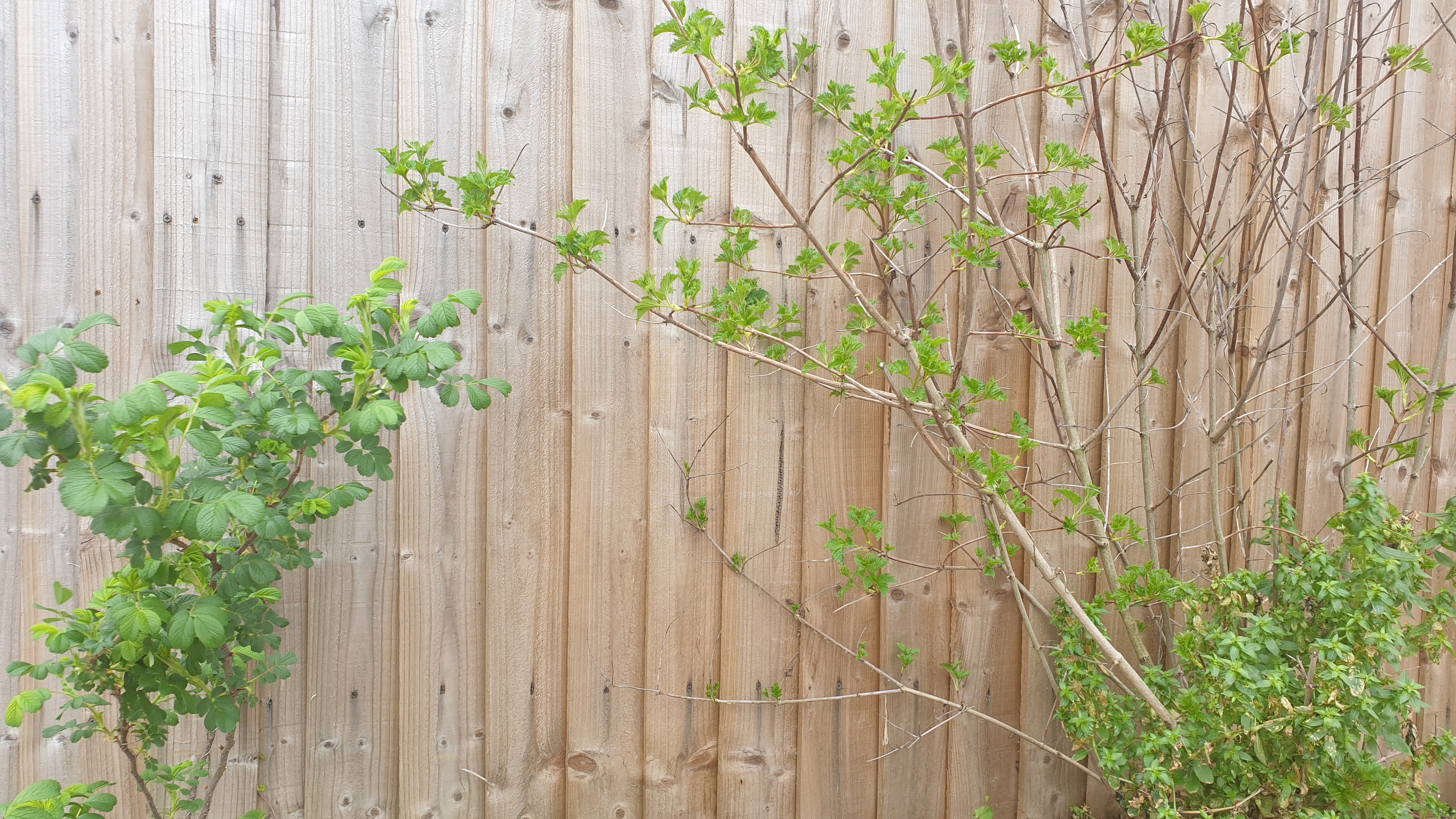
Rosa rugosa (left) and Viburnum opulus (left)

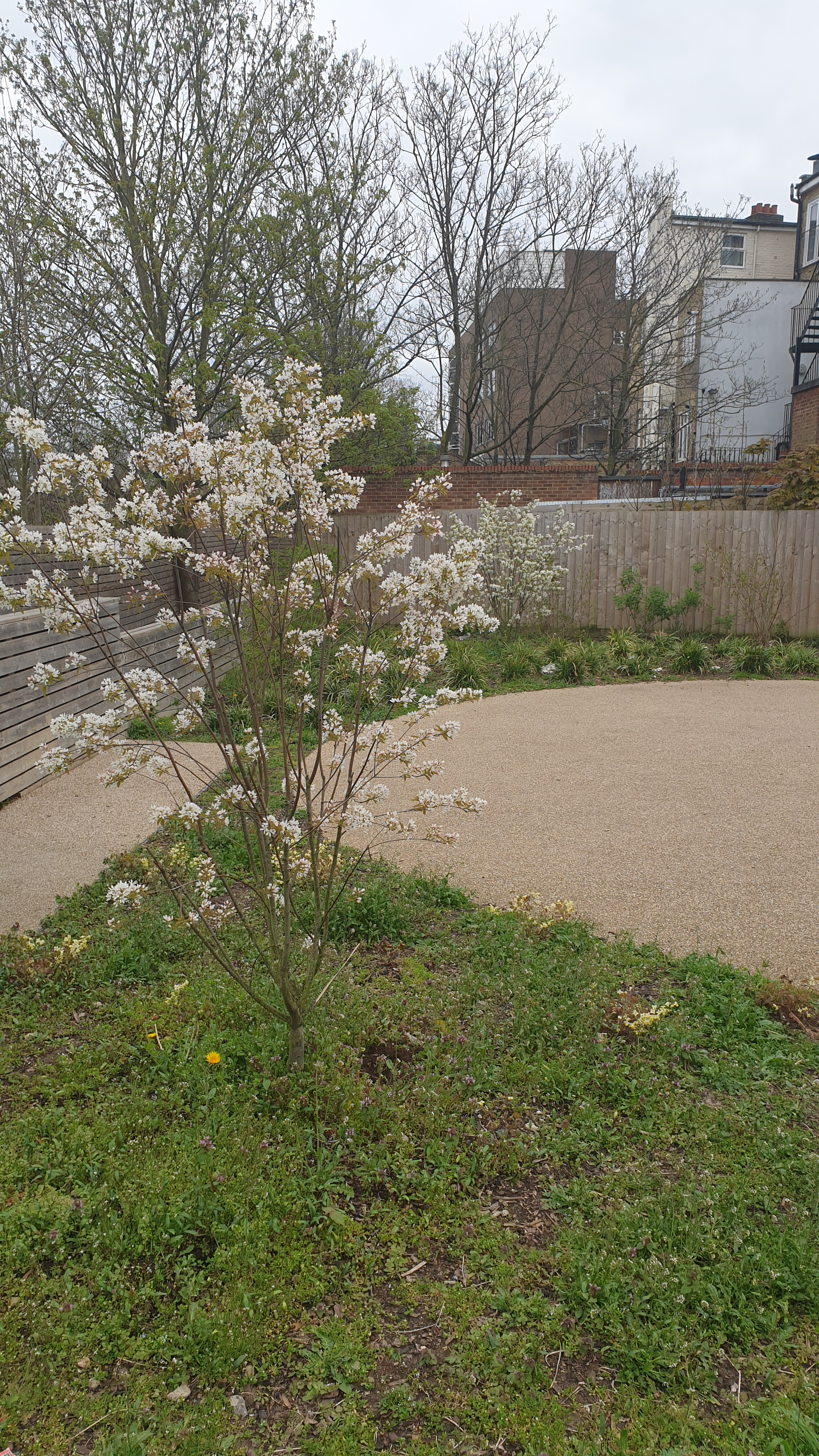
Shrubs in blossom at Putney Pocket Park

The site has a central circular hard landscaped area, surrounded by flowerbeds with plants including the evergreen Viburnum opulus and the rose Rosa rugosa. JCDecaux's The Putney Tower stands at the south end of the site, it is 11m high and displays digital advertisements.

== Amenities ==
On the edge of the park there is seating and a refuse bin. There is a TRAID clothes recycling bin on the pavement of Charlwood road.

== Transport ==
The park is served by Transport for London buses 74 and 337 which stop on the Upper Richmond road, Putney railway station (Southwestern Railway) is a 6-minute walk from the park. The Santander Cycles Putney Rail Station docking station is a 6-minute walk from the park.
