= Job Caudwell =

English social reformer and publisher (1820–1908)

Job Caudwell FRSL FRGS
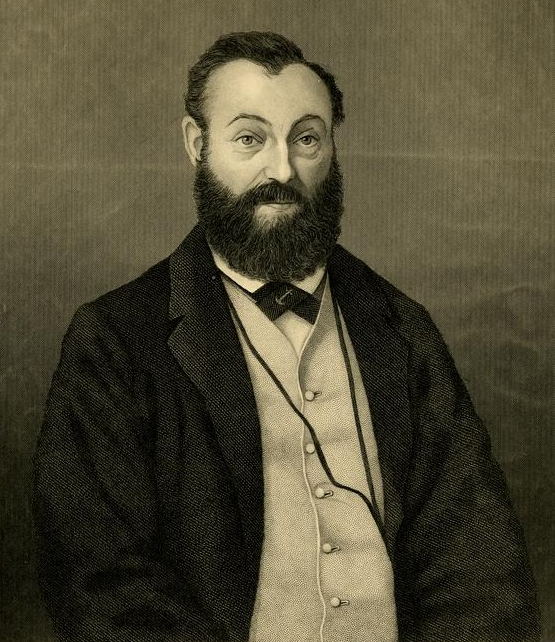
- Caudwell, c. 1850
- Born: 8 December 1820; Drayton Manor, Berkshire, England
- Died: 5 June 1908 (aged 87); Wandsworth, Surrey, England
- Resting place: Wandsworth Cemetery
- Occupations: Social reformer; editor; publisher
- Organizations: London Vegetarian Association; Anti-Compulsory Vaccination League
- Notable work: Vegetarian Cookery for the Million (1864)
- Spouses: Eliza Cooper Braine (m. 1860; died 1887) Eliza Harvey (m. 1901)
- Children: 10

Job Caudwell FRSL FRGS (8 December 1820 – 5 June 1908) was an English social reformer, editor, and publisher. He edited and published temperance and reform literature, and was associated with causes including temperance, vegetarianism, opposition to compulsory vaccination, homeopathy, and hydropathy. He was involved in the London Vegetarian Association and the Anti-Compulsory Vaccination League, and wrote the vegetarian cookbook Vegetarian Cookery for the Million (1864). Caudwell was elected a Fellow of the Royal Society of Literature and a Fellow of the Royal Geographical Society, and was a member of the Victoria Institute.

== Biography ==
=== Early life and family ===
Job Caudwell was born on 8 December 1820 at Drayton Manor, Berkshire. He was christened on 17 January 1821 in Drayton. He was the seventh and youngest son of William Caudwell (1779–1854) and Hannah Caudwell (née Lousley; 1782–1849). He had 20 siblings. His family belonged to an armigerous Caudwell lineage in Berkshire that had settled in Abingdon in 1790.

Caudwell was raised in rural Berkshire. He later travelled widely and developed interests in botany and antiquarian research.

=== Social reform ===
Caudwell was a teetotaller and wrote on social problems that he associated with alcohol consumption. With the temperance activist William Horsell, he co-published the Temperance Star (1857–1876) and the Temperance Spectator (1859–1867). After Horsell's death in 1863, Caudwell published the Journal of Health.

Caudwell became a vegetarian through reading and displayed vegetarian mottos in his home. He was involved in the vegetarian movement in London and with the London Vegetarian Association. He published the vegetarian cookbook Vegetarian Cookery for the Million in 1864. The Journal of Health reported that Caudwell had climbed Ben Nevis while following a vegetarian diet.

Caudwell was a member of the Anti-Compulsory Vaccination League, later the National Anti-Vaccination League. He also supported homeopathy and hydropathy.

=== Publishing and health enterprises ===
In July 1859, Caudwell entered into a publishing partnership with William Horsell at 335 Strand, London. The partnership lasted until September 1860.

From the same premises, Caudwell operated a small homeopathic institute, where he dispensed his own preparation of homeopathic cocoa and sold unadulterated flour. His publishing output in the 1860s included temperance dictionaries, health manuals, studies of Mormonism, Southcottian works, and studies of the American Civil War.

=== Societies ===
Caudwell was elected a Fellow of the Royal Society of Literature in 1863 and a Fellow of the Royal Geographical Society in 1879. In 1891, he became a member of the Victoria Institute.

=== Public recognition and other activities ===
Historian James Gregory describes Caudwell as a "household name" in the Victorian temperance movement. In February 1865, a memoir and portrait of Caudwell appeared in The Illustrated News of the World, where he served as editor. In 1881, he laid the cornerstone of Putney Methodist Church.

=== Personal life and death ===
Caudwell married Eliza Cooper Braine in 1860, and they had eight sons and two daughters. She died in 1887. In 1901, he married Eliza Harvey.

Caudwell later lived in Spencer Park, Wandsworth, in a concrete house built to his own design. He died there on 5 June 1908, aged 87. He was buried in Wandsworth Cemetery beneath a granite obelisk inscribed with the names of his first wife and their ten children. According to the memoir of his granddaughter Irene Caudwell, only Caudwell and his first wife were interred in the vault beneath the monument.

== Selected publications ==
- Vegetarian Cookery for the Million. (six editions; 1864–1865)
- Job Caudwell's Threepenny Pledge Book for the Pocket, etc. 1865. OCLC 557583794.

== See also ==
- History of vegetarianism
- Vegetarianism in the Victorian era
- Vegetarianism in the United Kingdom
- Temperance movement in the United Kingdom
