= Wandsworth Cemetery =

Cemetery in London, England

Coordinates: 51°26′47.5″N 0°10′53.2″W

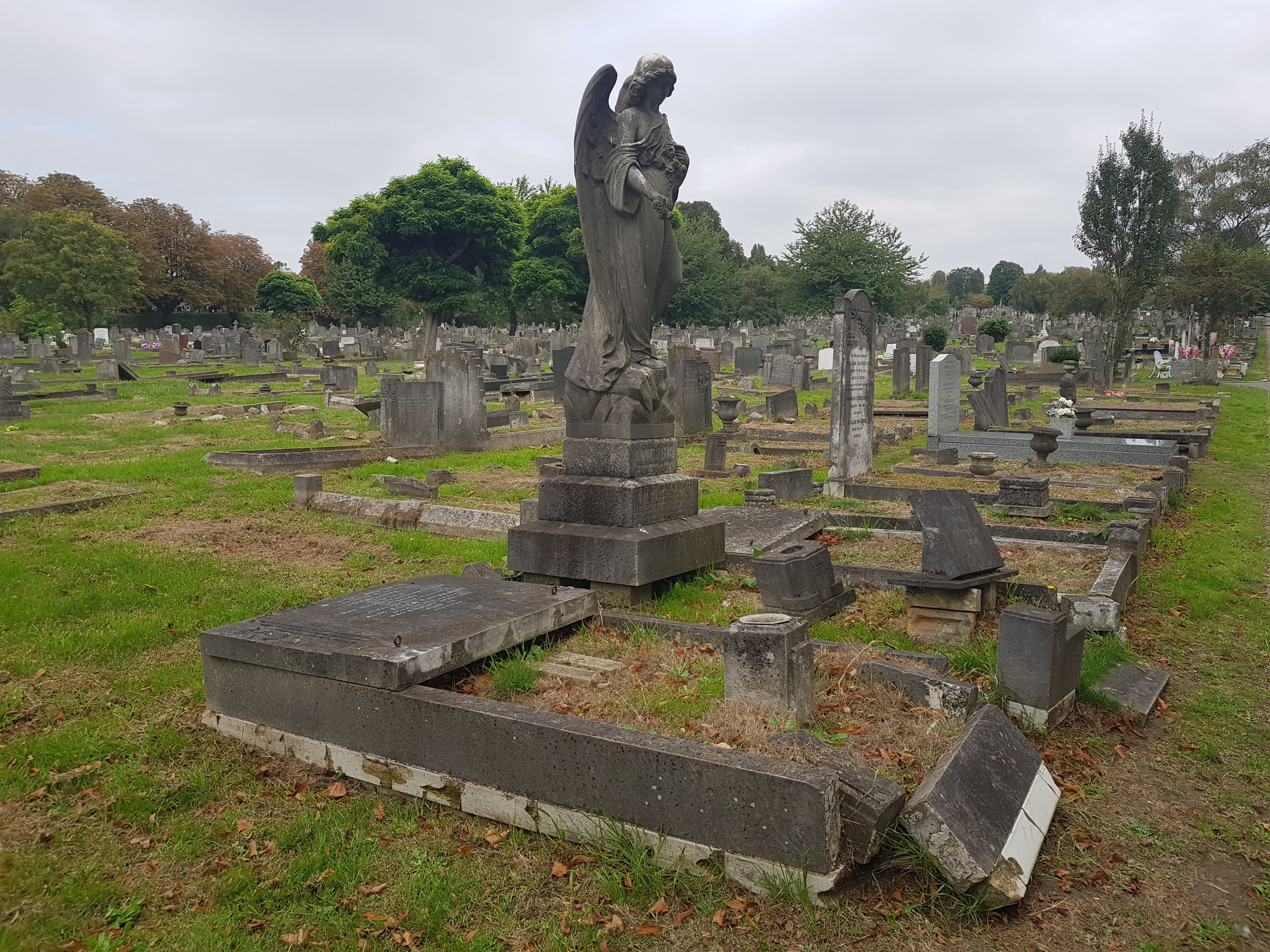
Wandsworth Cemetery in 2018

Wandsworth Cemetery, also known as Earlsfield Cemetery and Magdalen Road Cemetery, is a cemetery in Earlsfield, in the London Borough of Wandsworth, England. It lies to the north-east of Earlsfield railway station and is bounded by Magdalen Road to the east and the main railway line to the west.

== History ==
The cemetery was established by the Wandsworth Burial Board in 1878 and enlarged in 1898. It contains nearly 600 graves of servicemen and women from the First World War and Second World War. These include burials scattered throughout the cemetery and others grouped in small war plots. Service personnel from all six member governments of the Commonwealth War Graves Commission are commemorated there, including what the commission describes as the largest group of First World War soldiers of the Royal Newfoundland Regiment in any war cemetery in the United Kingdom.

== Notable burials ==
- Job Caudwell (1820–1906), social reformer and publisher
- James Collis (1856-1918), recipient of Victoria Cross in Second Anglo-Afghan War
