= James Collis =

Recipient of the Victoria Cross

James Collis VC
- Born: 19 April 1856; Cambridge, England
- Died: 28 June 1918 (aged 62); Battersea, London, England
- Burial place: Wandsworth Cemetery
- Military career
- Allegiance: United Kingdom
- Branch: British Army
- Service years: 1872–1881, 1887–1891, 1914–1917
- Rank: Private
- Units: Royal Horse Artillery; Suffolk Regiment
- Conflicts: Second Anglo-Afghan War; World War I
- Awards: Victoria Cross (forfeited)

James Collis VC (19 April 1856, Cambridge – 28 June 1918) was an English recipient of the Victoria Cross, the highest award for gallantry in the face of the enemy that can be awarded to British and Commonwealth forces.

== Military service ==
Collis was a 24‑year‑old gunner in the Royal Horse Artillery, British Army, during the Second Anglo-Afghan War. On 28 July 1880, during the retreat from Maiwand to Kandahar in Afghanistan, when the officer commanding the battery was trying to bring in a limber with wounded men under cross-fire, Gunner Collis ran forward and drew the enemy's fire on himself, thus taking their attention from the limber. He was awarded the Victoria Cross (VC) for this action. His citation read:

For conspicuous bravery during the retreat from Maiwand to Kandahar when the officer commanding the battery was endeavouring to bring in a limber with wounded men under a cross-fire, in running forward and drawing the enemy's fire on himself, thus taking off their attention from the limber.

He was presented his VC, on Poona (Pune) Racecourse, by Lord Roberts on 11 July 1881.

In 1881 he left the army and joined the Bombay Police, rising to rank of Inspector, before returning to England in 1884. In 1887 he re-enlisted in the army with the Suffolk Regiment and returned to serve in India in 1888, but was invalided home due to rheumatic fever in 1891.

In March 1882 Collis married in Bombay Adela Grace Skuse, a widow, who accompanied him until his latter return from India. In 1893, he married another woman, Mary Goddard, who was apparently unaware of his existing wife who had remained in India, until the deception was discovered in 1895. Collis became one of eight men whose VCs were forfeited, when he was stripped of the medal on 18 November 1895 after being convicted of bigamy.

After release from prison he settled in Bury St Edmunds where he had a series of civilian jobs. He re-enlisted in the Suffolk Regiment, in which he served as a private, service number 16525, in World War I, until discharged on medical grounds in August 1917.

He died, aged 62, on 28 June 1918 of a heart attack in Battersea hospital. He left a widow, Adela Grace Collis, who was living at Old Sapper's Lines, Mayo Road, Poona, India, his legal wife. At his funeral his coffin was draped with the Union Flag and borne on a gun carriage escorted by a military firing party. At Earlsfield Cemetery, Wandsworth he was given full military honours, and there was no mention of his crime or the forfeiture of the Victoria Cross.

== Post-death developments ==
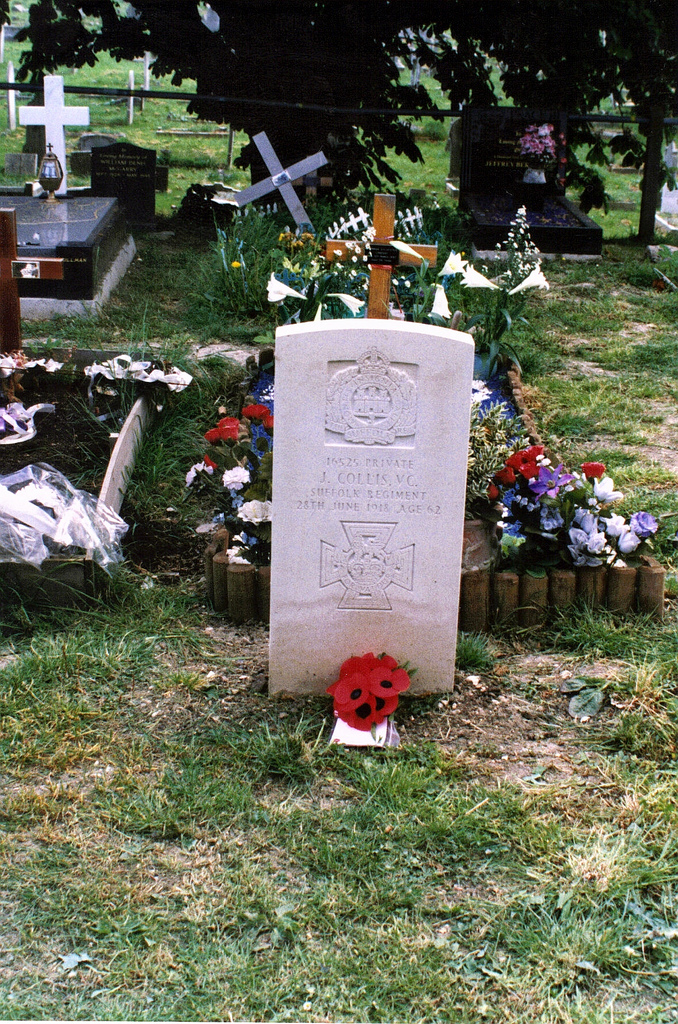
Gunner James Collis VC headstone

On Collis' death his sister made a plea to King George V to restore her brother's name to the VC register. She received a sympathetic reply from the King's private secretary Lord Stamfordham who while denying the request did support the proposal that Gunner Collis' name should be inscribed with those of other VC recipients on the tablets of the Royal Artillery Victoria Cross Memorial. When the subject of forfeiture was again raised, the King's view that "no matter the crime committed by anyone on whom the VC has been conferred, the decoration should not be forfeited" was expressed in another letter by Lord Stamfordham on 20 July 1920. There is no evidence to support the suggestion that this was in response to the earlier petition from the sister of James Collis.

Although his burial in Plot B, Section 20, grave 295, was registered with the Commonwealth War Graves Commission (initially omitting the postnominal VC), for 80 years he lay in an unmarked pauper's grave, with no headstone to acknowledge his act of bravery in the service of his country. On 22 May 1998 a ceremony was held at Wandsworth Council's Earlsfield Cemetery in Magdalen Road to mark the erection of a headstone, resplendent with the carving of his Victoria Cross.

The medal was bought by Lord Ashcroft in 2014 and is now on display in the Imperial War Museum, London.

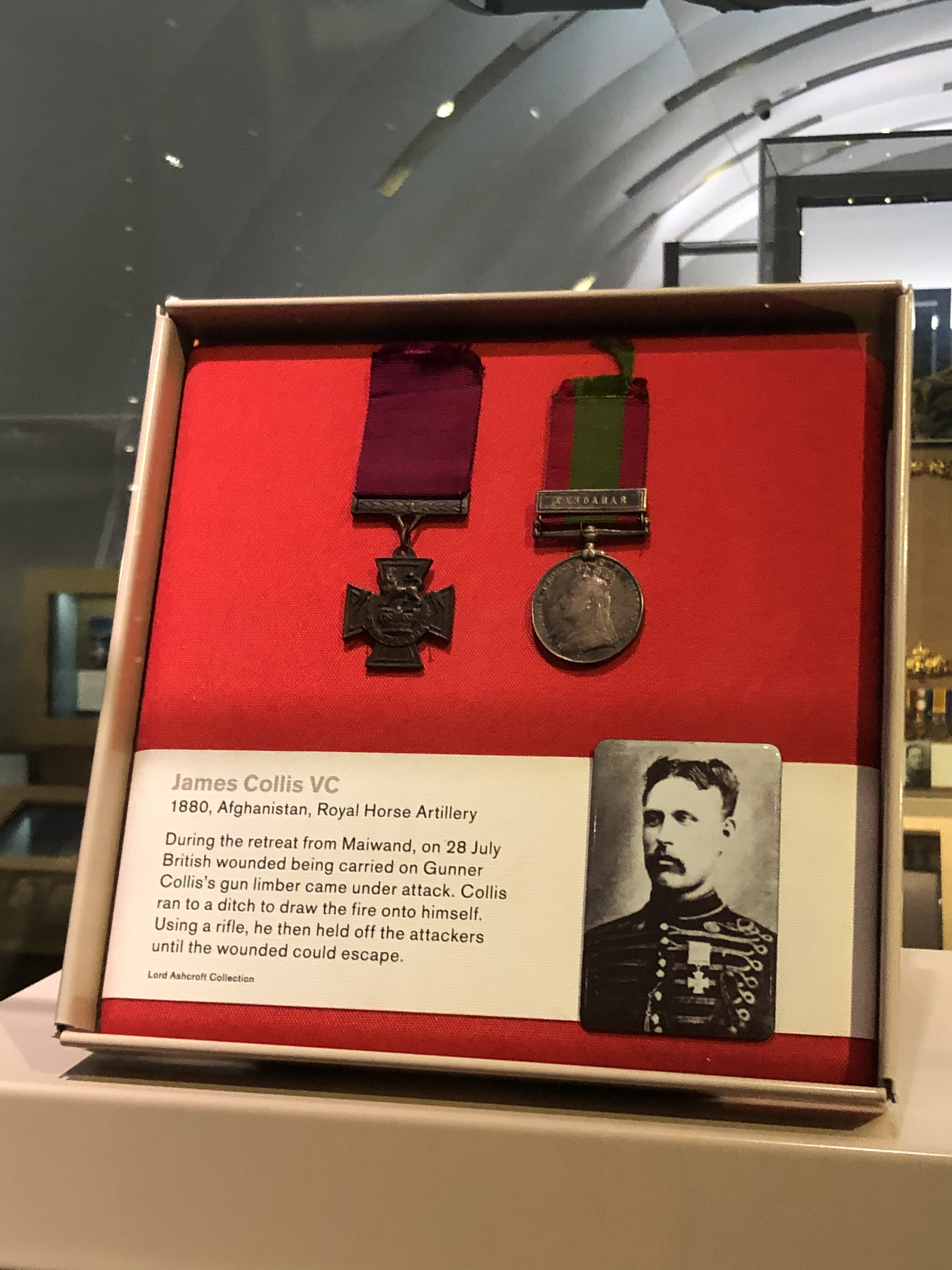
James Collis VC on display at the Imperial War Museum, London.
