= Villa di Maiano =

15th-century villa near Florence, Italy

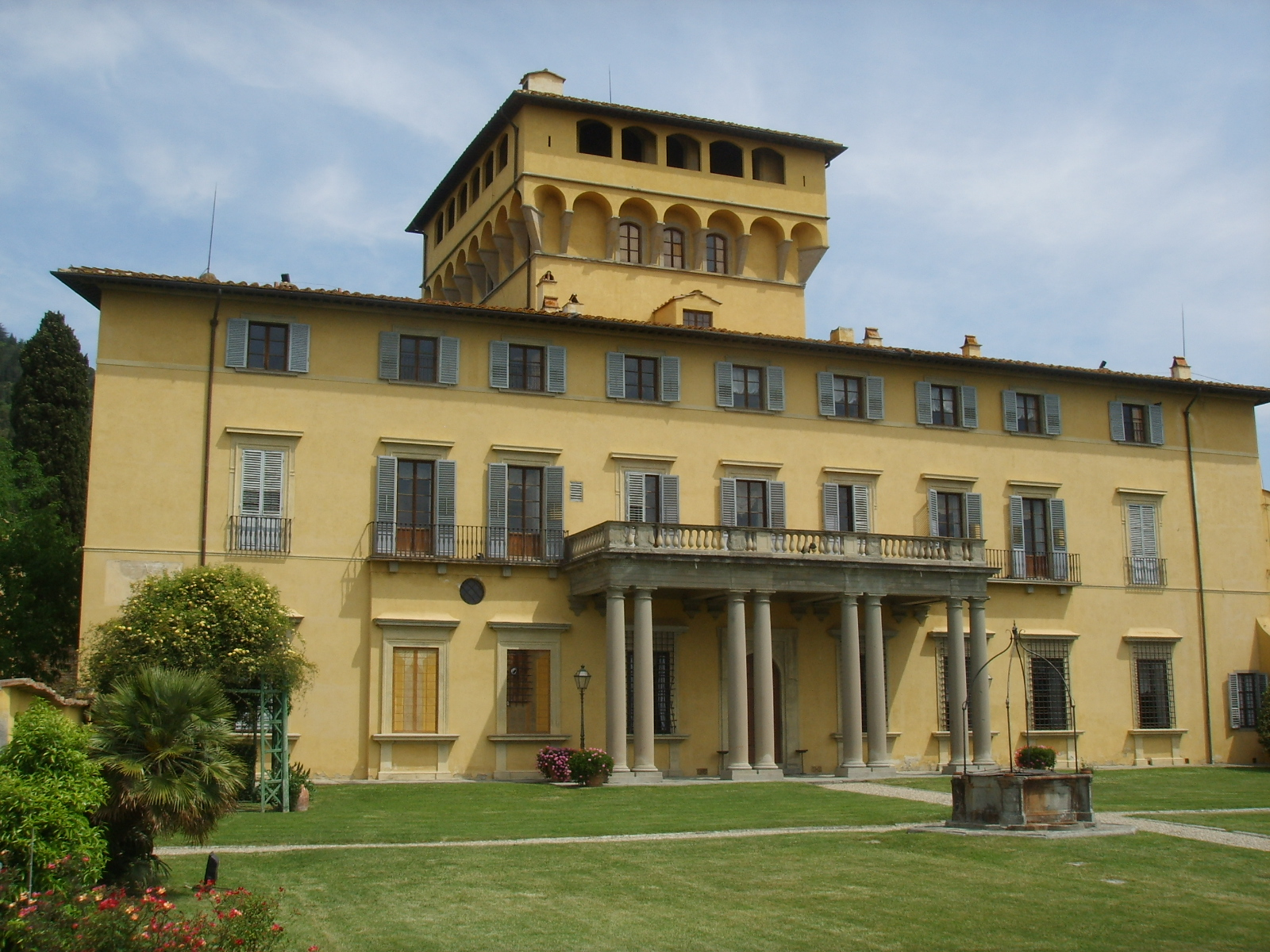
- Interactive map of the Villa di Maiano area

General information
- Location: Fiesole, Italy
- Coordinates: 43°47′35.35″N 11°18′13.22″E

Villa di Maiano is a 15th-century villa at Via del Saviatino 1 in the Maiano area of Fiesole, near Florence, Italy.

== History and architecture ==
The original "palagio di Maiano" was battered in 1467 by a hurricane, so much so that the then owner, Bartolomeo degli Alessandri, in order to handle his debts had to sell the entire complex with the large surrounding estate. In the first half of the 16th century it came to the Sforza, and then to the Buonagrazia. In 1546, it was owned by the Pazzi, and it was here that Caterina, the future santa Maria Maddalena dei Pazzi, was born.

In the 18th century, the noble line of the Pazzi ended with Luigi di Cosimo, and the villa then came to Gucci Tolomei before becoming the property of John Temple Leader, who bought it in 1850 "with closed gate"; that is to say, with all its contents.

The eclectic English politician made the villa his residence and the center of his affairs, beginning with the overall renovation of the area, which would reach its peak in the neo-Gothic conversion of the nearby Vincigliata Castle.

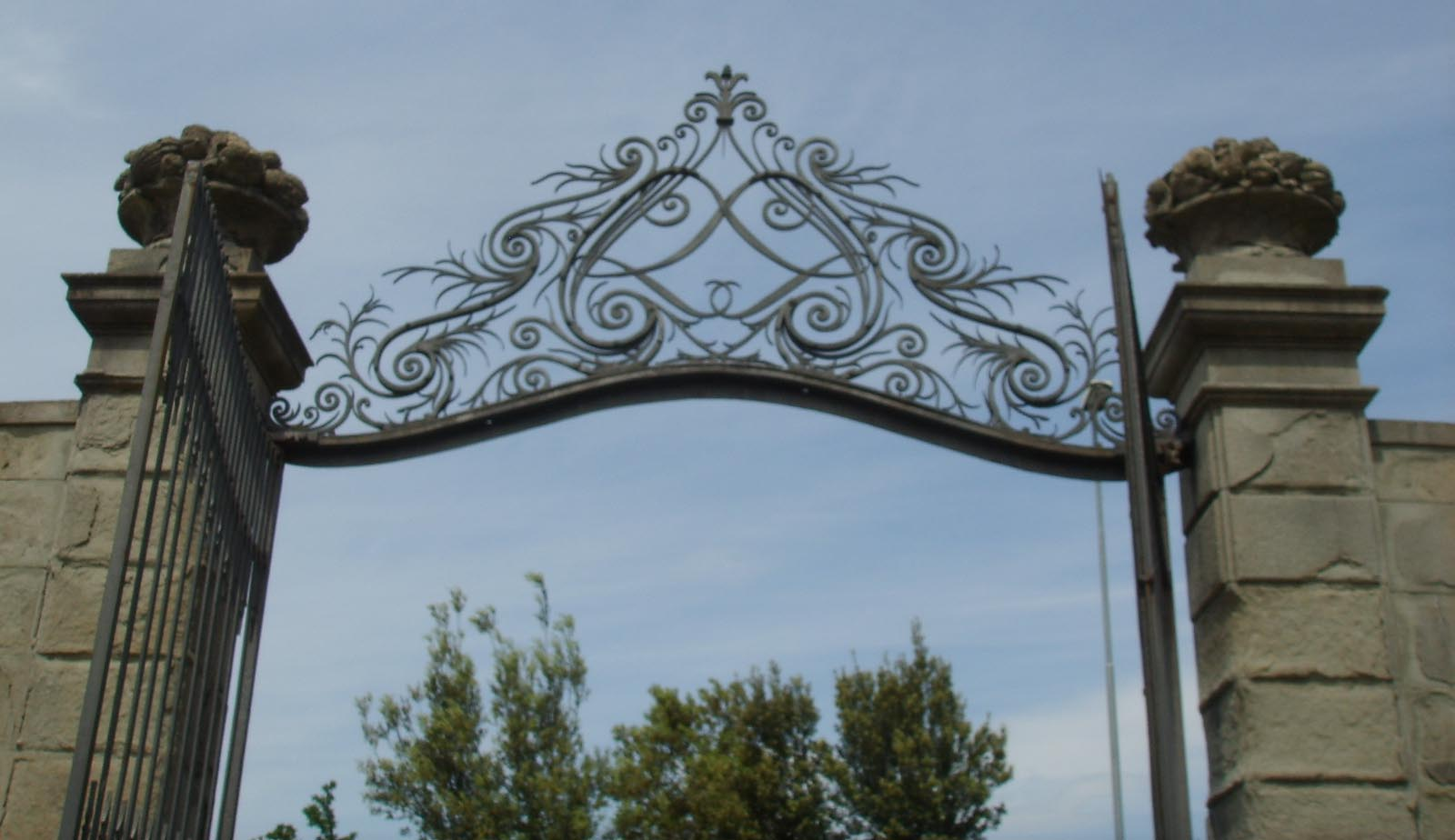
The Wrought Iron Gate

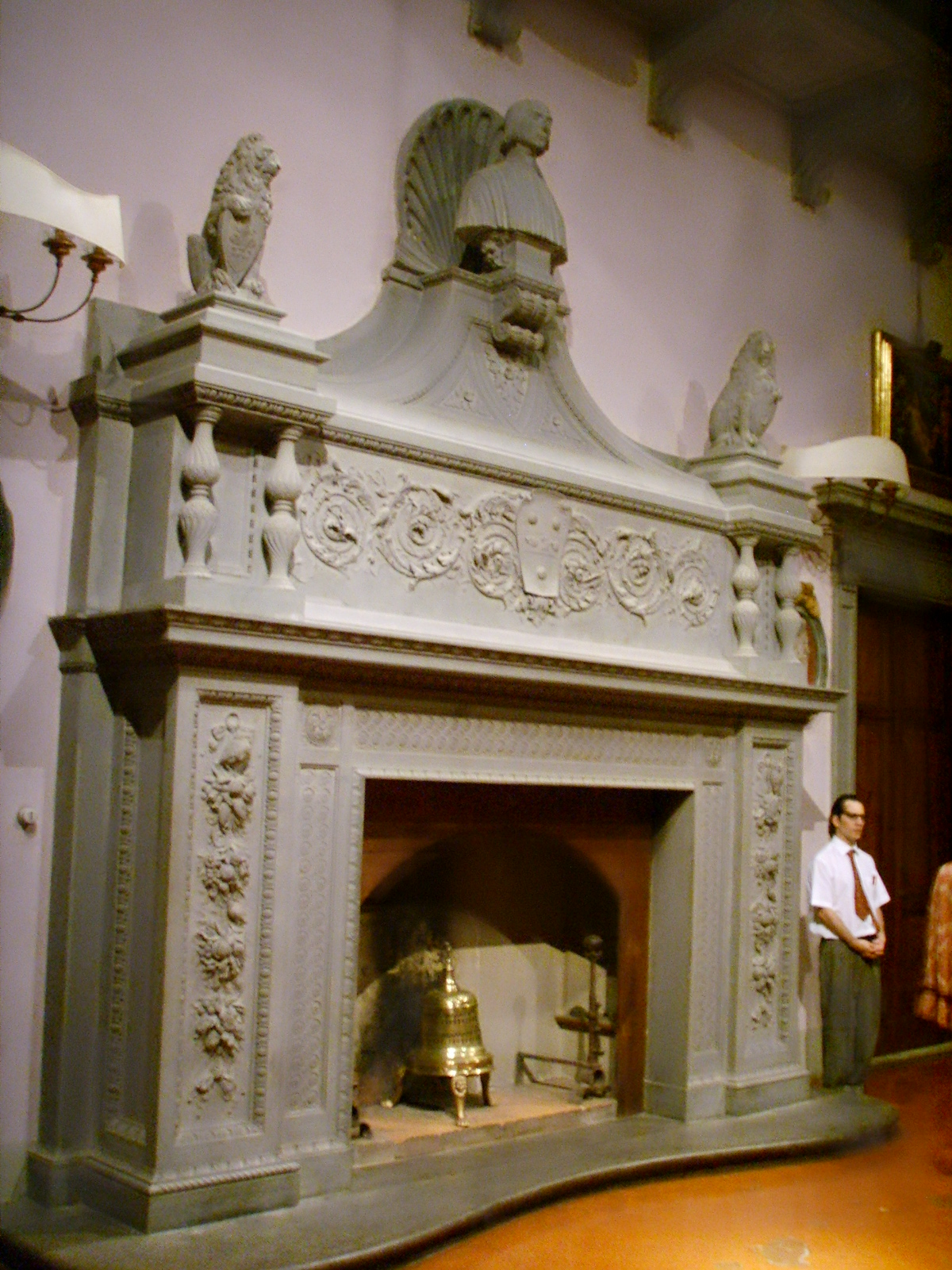
The Monumental Stone Fireplace in the Main Hall

The architect Felice Francolini worked for Temple Leader on the Villa Maiano. Respecting the 15th-century appearance of the property, he began an overall alteration with some fairly radical aspects such as the raising of the ground floor and the addition of a central keep in the Gothic style with a loggia (similar, for example, to that of the Villa Petraia).

The central courtyard was transformed into a large neo-renaissance ballroom, furnished with original pieces of the villa or specially commissioned from local artisans. The final phase was the construction of the private chapel, located on the north side of the villa between 1863 and 1864. The small chapel was built to a design by Joseph Francelli, who was the son of John Temple Leader factor and a descendant of a family of other members distinguished themselves in the field of art. The Francelli created an intimate environment with a single nave separated from the body of the villa and with the decoration of shop windows of prestigious Ulysses de Matteis.

The villa had many famous guests, including Queen Victoria, who in 1893 made a few sketches of the pond for her album of memories.

With the death of leaders in 1903 all his property passed to his nephew Richard Bethell, Lord Westbury, who sold the villa to the surgeon Teodoro Stori in 1917. The descendants of his wife, Elizabeth Corsini are the current owners of the villa, which is why it is also sometimes referred to as Villa Corsini Majano.

== Garden ==
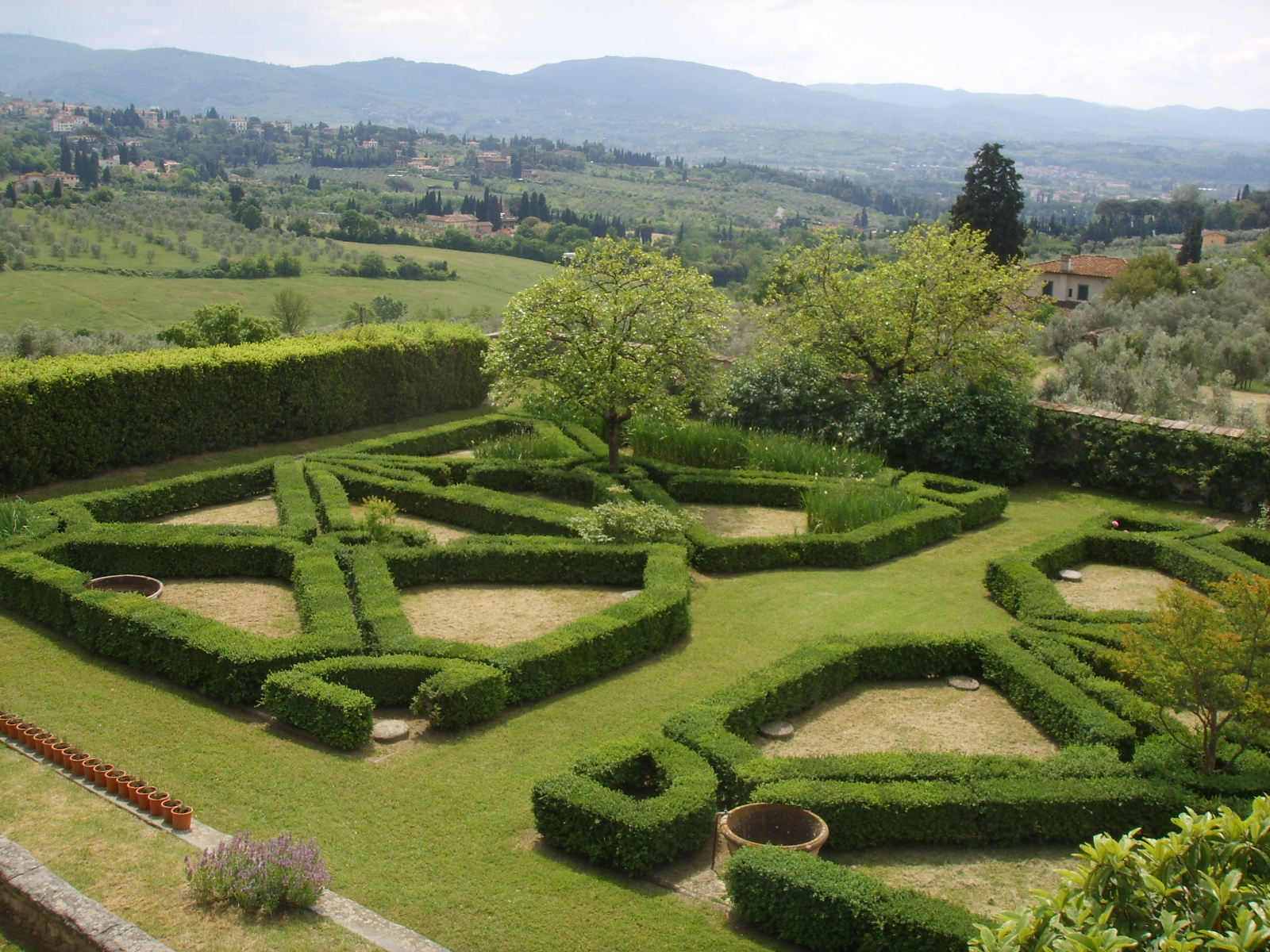
Gardens at the Villa di Maiano

The garden in front of the villa consists of a large lawn, moved by some elements such as a well, a gazebo and a rectangular pool decorated after a refined neo-Gothic loggetta in two colors of brick and stone and the Laghetto columns of irregular shape that exploited a natural cavity. In these basins John Temple Leader would usually dive in for personal pleasure, and to rejuvenate the mind and exercise the body.

In the final part of a paved terrace with stone balustrades is the best vantage point of the garden. From the meadow, on axis with the main entrance of the villa, two lions-marzocchi with family coats of arms introduce a shift to the lower terrace, with a barrel vault.

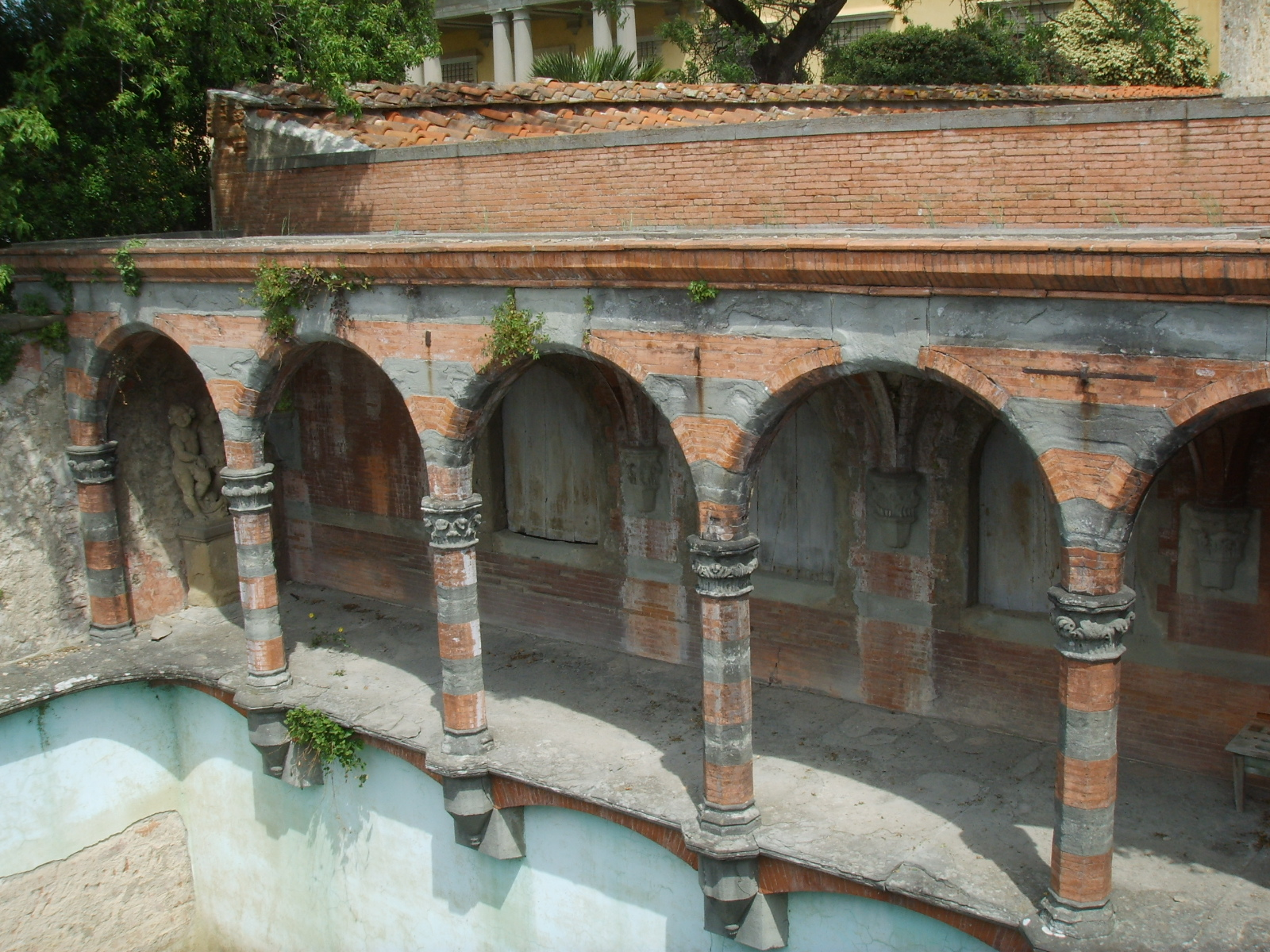
Neo-Gothic Pool

The lower terrace houses a large garden, surrounded by geometric boxwood hedges and a host of various flower essences. The north side, below the terrace of the upper level, is closed by a service building that also serves as a limonaia.

The west side, towards Via del Salviatino, has a smaller terrace that looks on the agricultural property. There is a lawn with two tall trees, bordered by boxwood hedges that create geometric patterns.

The northern part of the villa instead features a landscaped park, designed by Giuseppe Francelli and Alessandro Papini (expert in hydraulics and valuable landscape architect), was created in an area in a state of neglect where there stood ancient stone quarries of sandstone. There are also forests of conifers and deciduous trees, waterways and olive groves, dotted here and there with statues, fountains and other decorations.

== Video games ==
The Villa di Maiano bears a striking resemblance to the Villa Auditore in Assassin's Creed II and Assassin's Creed: Brotherhood. The essential structure of the Villa Auditore is almost identical to the one in Maiano. Although the Villa Auditore is virtual, it appears bigger in scale than the Villa di Maiano. There are also many other minor differences, but what is also important to note is that the Villa Auditore is set in Monteriggioni whereas the Villa di Maiano is northeast of Florence.

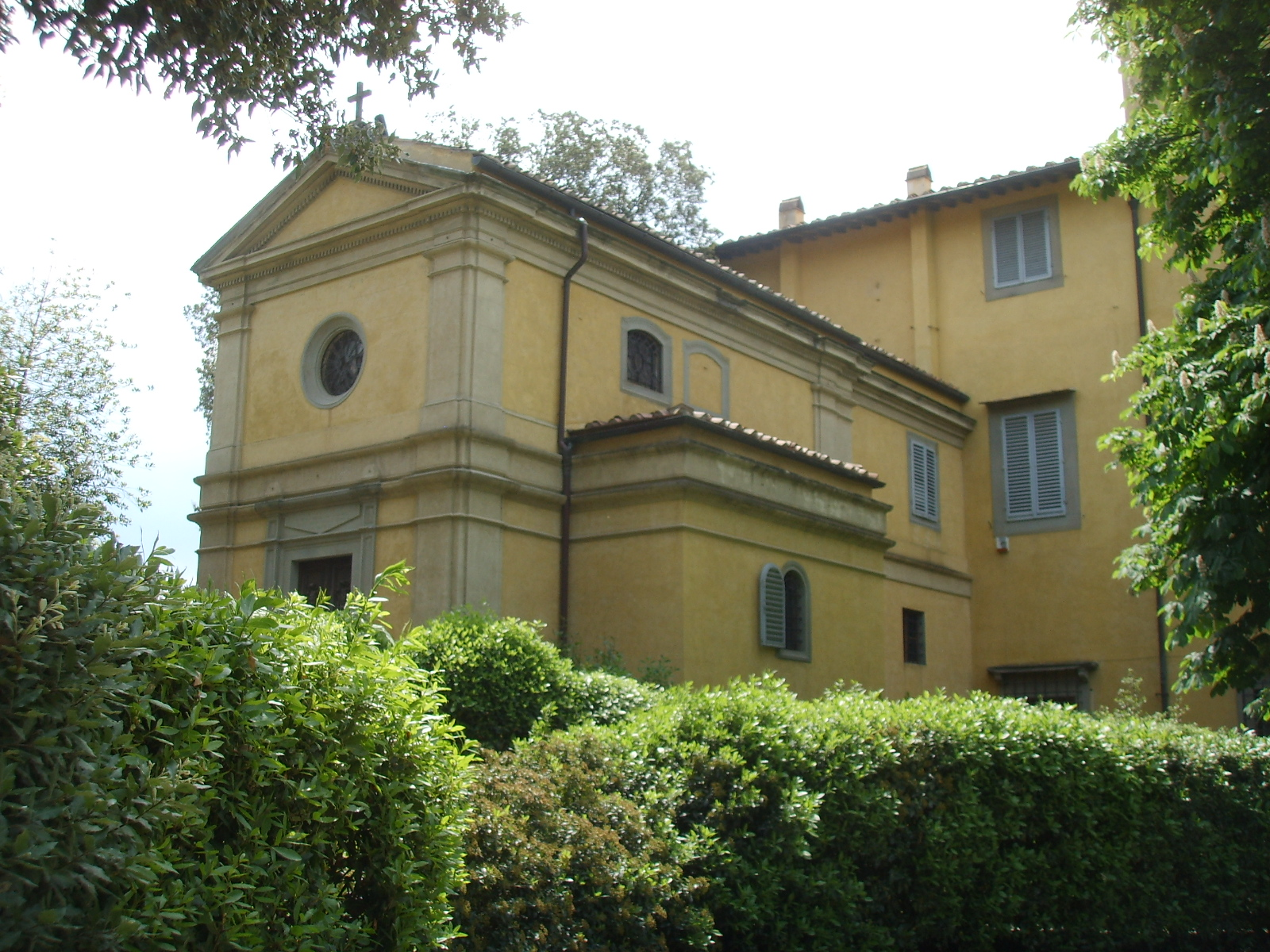
The Chapel

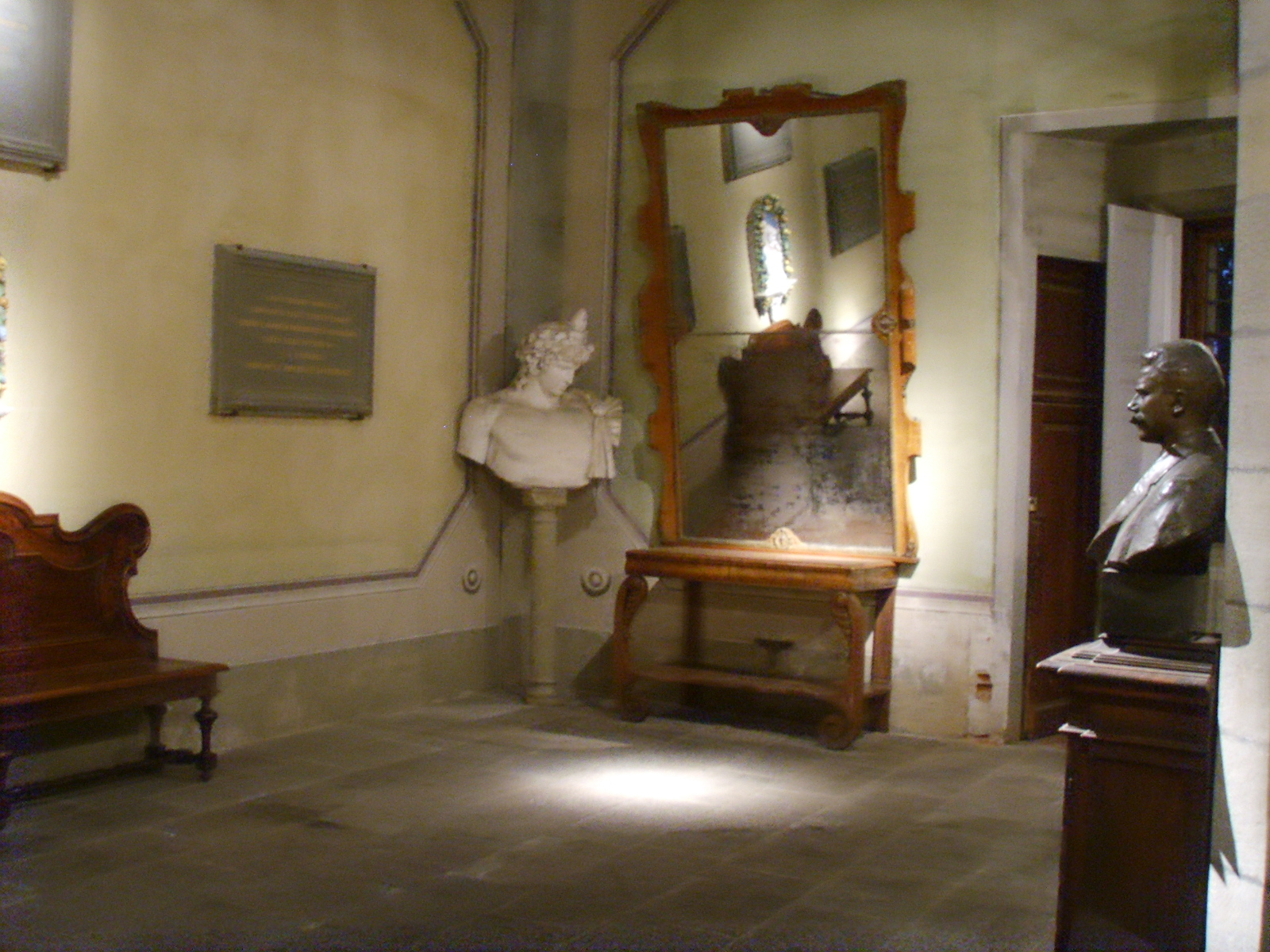
The entrance vestibule, adorned with statues and gravestones

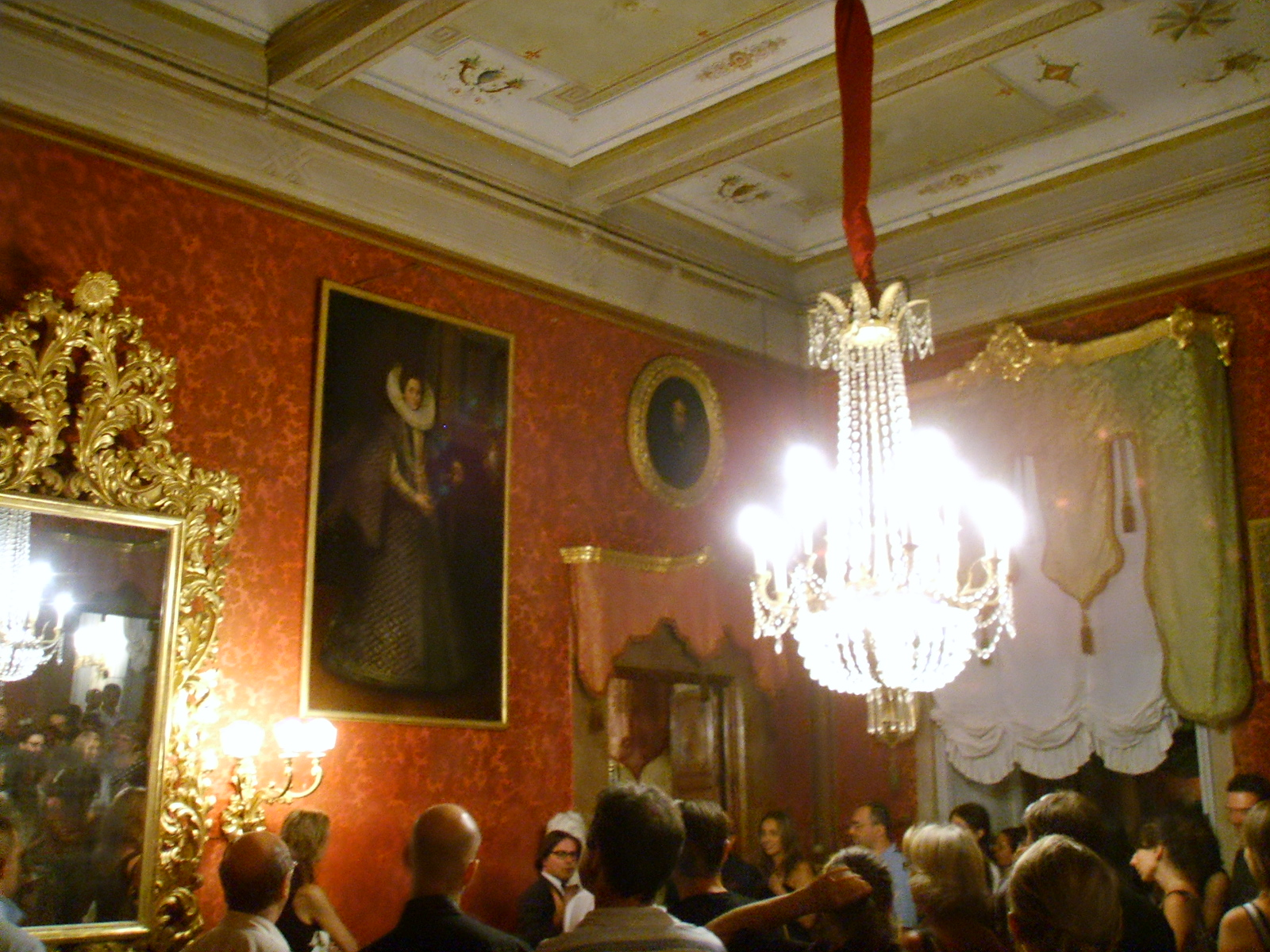
Red Room

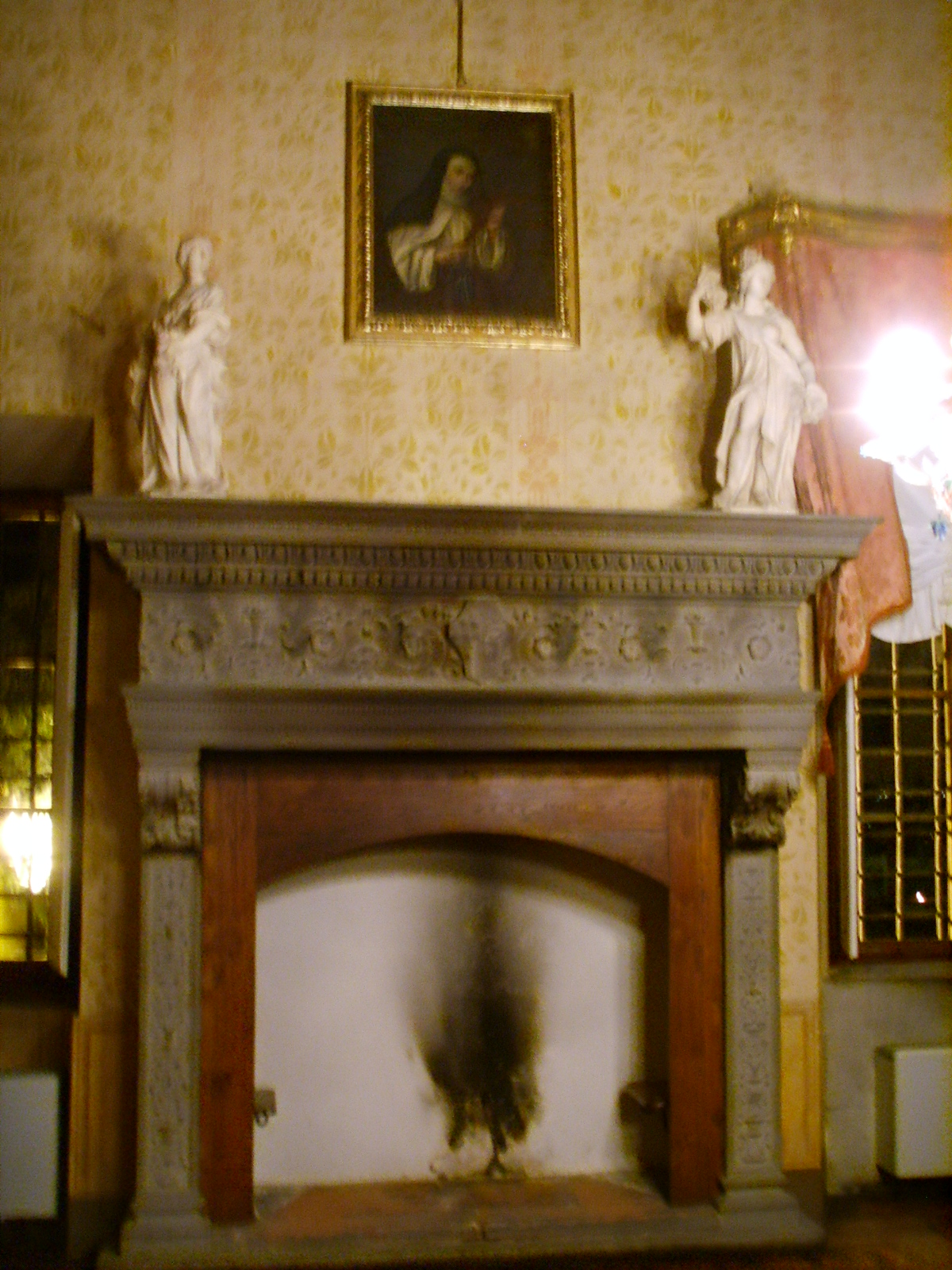
Dining Room
