= Lancelot Holland (British Army officer) =

Lancelot Holland, also Launcelot (1781–1859) was a British Army officer and diarist. In later life he went into business, and became a company director. He was also a noted bibliophile and collector.

== Background and early life ==
He was a grandson of Lancelot Brown, the garden designer known as "Capability Brown"; his parents were the architect Henry Holland and Bridget Brown. He went to Harrow School, where he overlapped with Henry Drury, entering the school in 1790 at age nine, and leaving in 1798. He joined the army, possibly the 134th Foot. In October 1798 he was an ensign in the 1st Foot Guards.

In 1799 Holland accompanied Robert Craufurd who had been sent as military attaché on a mission in continental Europe, part of William Pitt's Grand Design for the War of the Second Coalition. Craufurd's other aide on this journey was William Proby, Lord Proby. That year Holland was promoted to captain. Craufurd married Holland's sister Mary Frances, in 1800.

From around 1800 Holland was serving under Robert Brownrigg, who became Quartermaster-General to the Forces. Connections through his father's architectural work yielded him, in 1803, a visit as guest to Samuel Whitbread at Southill Park, and another to Lord Robert Spencer at Woolbeding House. In 1804 his duties took him to Ireland. On his return, he paid a call on Edmund Boyle, 8th Earl of Cork at Marston Bigot Park, where his father had recently been staying. That year he was promoted to major.

== Buenos Aires expedition ==
Holland was, from 1805 to 1807, officially Permanent Assistant to the Quartermaster General. He was on Robert Crauford's staff for the unsuccessful British invasion of the Spanish Empire's territory by the River Plate in 1807. His staff duties included copying out John Whitelocke's orders for the surrender. Holland commented on the composition – largely people of colour – of the force that had defeated them.

The diary Holland kept remained in manuscript, and was put up for sale in 1954. It has partly been published in Spanish translation, as Expedición al Río de la Plata. A review called it "the best account of the assault of July 5." The manuscript went to University College, London.

== Later life ==
Following the South American campaign, Holland joined the 89th Foot with rank of major. He served once more with Crawfurd in the Peninsular War. Craufurd was killed in action at the beginning of 1812. That year, Holland was in London, serving on the initial committee running the new (fourth) Drury Lane Theatre that had replaced the third theatre, built to a design by his father (died 1806), which had burned down in 1809. He was promoted to the rank of colonel in 1814, and at that point retired from the Army.

In peace time Holland was a timber merchant, and gave evidence on the trade to a parliamentary committee in 1821; the leading building timber firm Copland, Rowles & Holland had his father named third, and a cousin Henry Rowles named second. He was one of the group from business and politics who salvaged John Maberly's linen factories from Maberly's personal ruin, and became a director of Richards of Aberdeen; he was involved by 1831, when the company was still Maberly & Co., shortly afterwards changed to Richards & Co. for the partner John Baker Richards. He himself was later a partner. Other directorships included Royal Exchange Assurance.

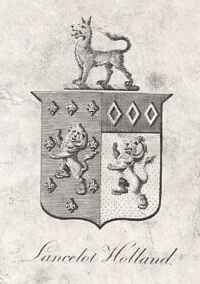
Armorial bookplate of Lancelot Holland

As a collector, Holland owned an edition of Virgil by William Caxton described as "extremely rare".

Holland died at home, at Langley Farm, Beckenham, aged 78. He was buried in the churchyard of St George's Church, Beckenham. After his death, in 1860, his books and Greek and Etruscan ceramics were sold.

== Family ==
Holland married Charlotte Peters. They had 15 children. The eldest son was Henry Lancelot Holland. Of the daughters, Caroline married the Rev. Francis Storr, son of Paul Storr, and Julia married the Rev. Duncan Travers, son of Eaton Stannard Travers R.N. The fourth daughter, Sophia, married in 1846 the Rev. Francis Bourdillon, and was mother of Francis William Bourdillon.

Edward, the second son, was a cleric who graduated from Magdalen Hall, Oxford in 1840, and married Eliza Anne Honnywill, daughter of the West India merchant Richard Honnywill Jr. of Clifton, in 1843. His father's address is given as Borough House; Banstead. Charles, the fourth son, was another cleric, who graduated from University College, Oxford in 1839, and became rector of Petworth in 1859. He married Emily Torlesse, daughter of the Rev. Charles Martin Torlesse.
