= Henry Lancelot Holland =

English industrialist and banker (1808–1893)

- Born: 1808
- Died: 1893 (aged 84–85)
- Occupation: industrialist

Henry Lancelot Holland (1808–1893) was an English industrialist and banker, Governor of the Bank of England from 1865 to 1867.

== Life ==
He was born in Dorking, Surrey in 1808, the son of Colonel Lancelot Holland. He was educated at Charterhouse School, and Harrow School from 1820/21.

== Richards & Co. ==
Holland was in business as a partner in Richards & Co., a linen manufacturer and merchant. The firm founded by John Maberly brought in new finance with John Baker Richards as a partner, in 1825, trading as Maberly & Co. James William Freshfield and Robert Langford became involved as property trustees, in 1829.

Maberly during the 1820s introduced steam power in the linen factories; but ran into trouble in financial operations. He was in the end bankrupted by 1832. Others brought into the firm included William Leader (died 1828), to whose son John Temple Leader debts owed by Maberly passed. The name of the firm became Richards & Co. from 1831, and that year Lancelot Holland became involved.

Henry Lancelot Holland joined Richards & Co. in 1837. He became one of the partners, with his father, John Temple Leader, George Edwards and others. He was later head of the company, and its Broadford Works in Aberdeen. The company had also spinning and power looms at Montrose, and bleachfields at Rubislaw and Craigo.

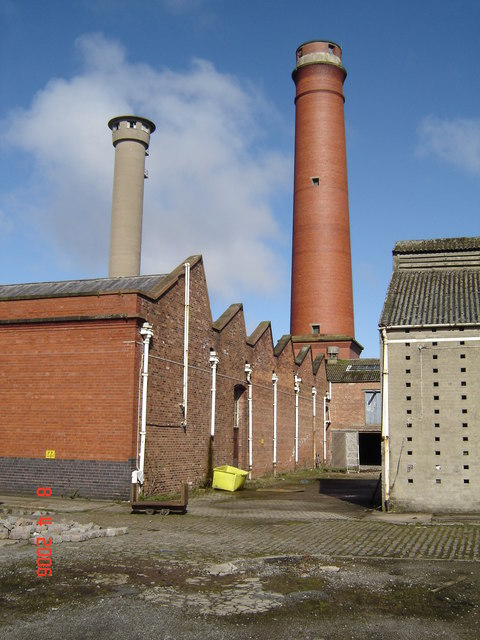
Broadford Works, Aberdeen, 2006 photograph

== Bank of England ==
Holland was Deputy Governor from 1863 to 1865. He replaced Kirkman Daniel Hodgson as Governor and was succeeded by Thomas Newman Hunt. Holland's tenure as Governor included dealing with the Panic of 1866.

== Death ==
Holland held directorships in insurance companies, and others. He died on 24 January 1893 in Hampton, Surrey, aged 84.

== Family ==
Holland married in 1844 Martha Elizabeth Cator, daughter of Peter Cator of Beckenham. They had five sons and three daughters.

== See also ==
- Chief Cashier of the Bank of England
