= Henry Holland (cricketer) =

English cricketer

Henry Holland (1791 at Hartley Row, Hartley Wintney, Hampshire – 2 February 1853 at Hartley Row) was an English cricketer who played from 1807 to 1825 for Hampshire, making 6 known appearances.

== Career ==
Holland played his first match for Hampshire on 25 May 1807 against England at Lord's Old Ground. Batting at nine, he scored four and one not out as England won by 47 runs. Holland did not play another game for Hampshire for ten years until the Marylebone Cricket Club (MCC) faced Hampshire at Lord's Cricket Ground on 6 August 1817. During this match Holland batted at three, scoring his career best 27, following by two in the second innings, and taking two catches.

Holland's final four matches came at more regular intervals. He met the MCC while playing for Godalming Cricket Club, first on 27 June 1822, scoring five and eight down the order, and a second time on 1 July that same year, scoring six not out and five. He played for Hampshire against England on 14 August 1823, scoring 11 and 10, and against Godalming on 27 June 1825, scoring 11 in a three-day match in which he opened the batting.
