= Don Caudwell =

Australian rules footballer

Personal information
- Full name: Don Caudwell
- Born: 12 September 1929
- Died: 14 May 2006 (aged 76)
- Original team: Parkdale

Playing career^{1}
Years	Club	Games (Goals)
1951	Collingwood	1 (0)
- ^{1} Playing statistics correct to the end of 1951.

Don Caudwell (12 September 1929 – 14 May 2006) was an Australian rules footballer who played with Collingwood in the Victorian Football League (VFL).
