= Putney Arts Theatre =

Theatre in Putney, Wandsworth, London

Coordinates: 51°27′41.41″N 0°13′15.03″W

- PAT
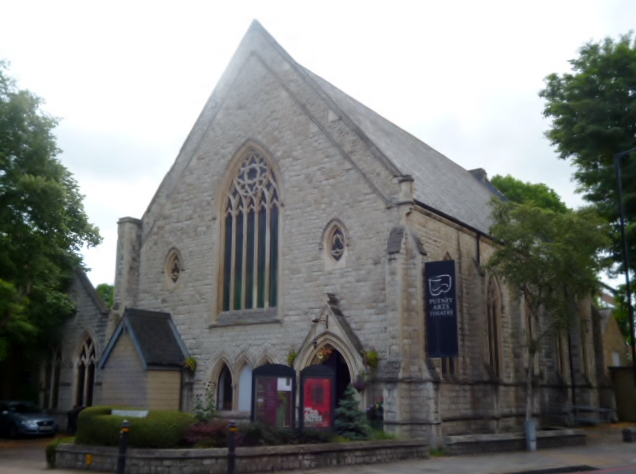
- Putney Arts Theatre in 2013
- Interactive map of Putney Arts Theatre
- Former names: Union Chapel
- Owner: Group 64
- Type: Theatre

Construction
- Built: 1860
- Opened: July 1968

Putney Arts Theatre ("PAT") is based in Putney, in the London Borough of Wandsworth and operates as a community space specialising in theatre productions.

The Putney Arts Theatre stands in the Union Chapel built by Sir Samuel Morton Peto in the late 19th century. After the original congregation fell dissolved, the London City Council acquired the building.

In 1968, the theatre troupe Group 64 leased the Union Chapel in Putney from the London County Council. Group 64 purchased the building in 1998 and renamed it the Putney Arts Theatre. The opening production was attended by Sir John Mills, a patron of the theatre.

Group 64 Youth Theatre is the resident Youth Theatre Group, and Putney Theatre Company is the resident Adult Theatre Group.

In 2017, the theatre was renovated.

The Putney Arts Theatre is a registered charity.
