= Harry Holland (artist) =

British painter (born 1941)

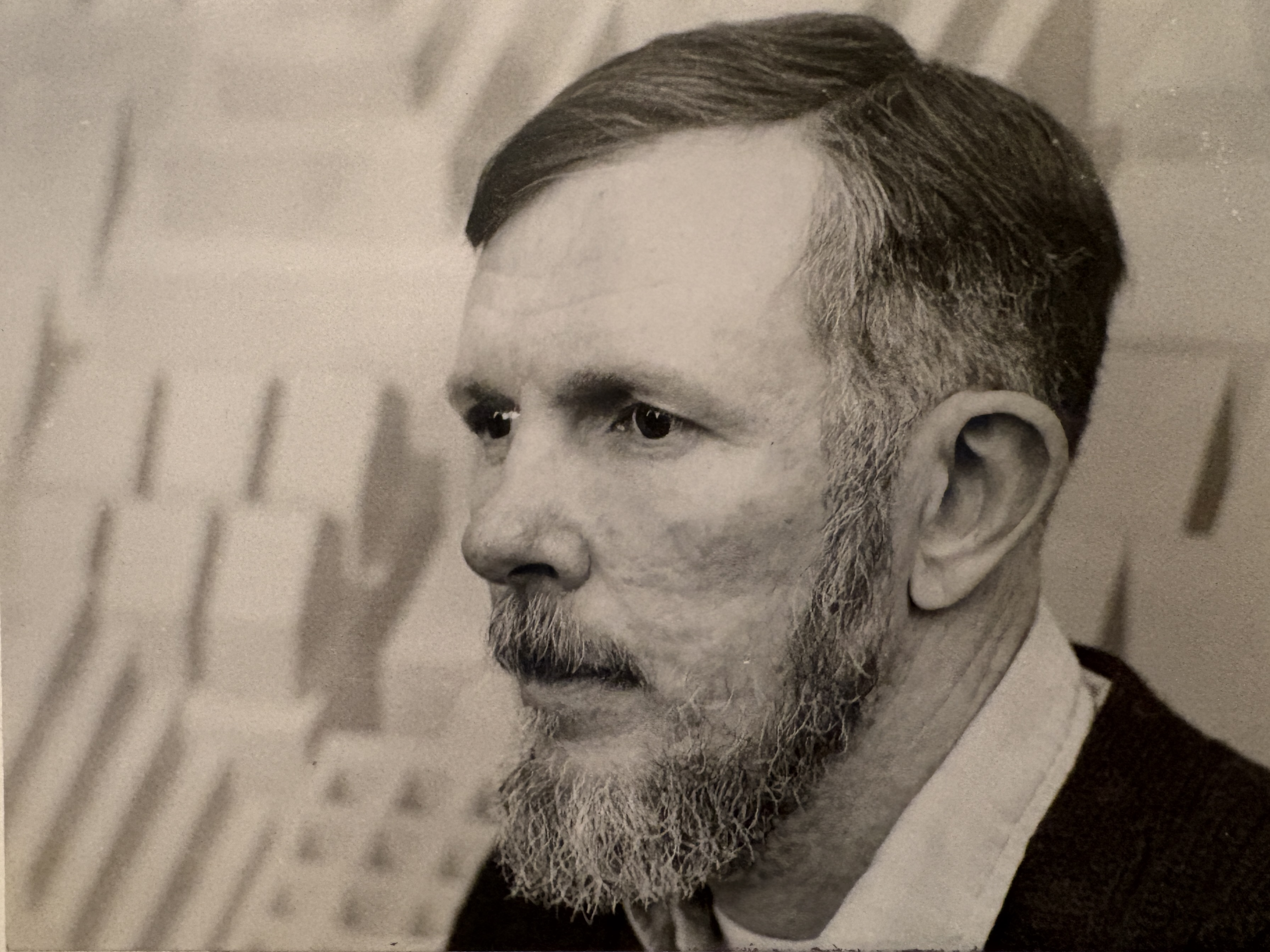
- Harry Holland c. 1980
- Born: 1941 (age 84–85); Glasgow, Scotland, United Kingdom
- Education: Saint Martin's School of Art
- Occupation: Painter
- Website: www.harryholland.com

Harry Holland (born 1941) is a British painter known for his figurative work. He has been based in Cardiff, Wales since 1973.

== Life and career ==
Harry Holland was born in 1941 in Glasgow. He spent his childhood in various parts of the UK before settling with his mother, stepfather and brother in London in 1951. He was educated at Rutlish Grammar School, Merton. From 1965 to 1969, he studied at Saint Martin's School of Art, where he exhibited at the graduation show in 1969. Initially working mainly as a copyist and illustrator, Holland went on to teach at Coventry College of Art, also in Stourbridge and Hull, before moving to the Cardiff School of Art in 1973. By 1978, he was able to commit solely to painting, following the purchase of his work by the collector Charles Saatchi.

Holland was one of four "painters of promise for the 1980s" nominated by the Financial Times critic, William Packer, in a 1978 Vogue magazine article spotlighting a new generation, published as Packer was curating the British Art Show which would open in 1979.

During the 1980s, Holland exhibited in New York, Brussels and Paris. In London, his work was shown at the Thumb Gallery (later known as the Jill George Gallery) from 1988, and also at the Albemarle Gallery. Since 1992, Holland has exhibited regularly at the Martin Tinney Gallery, Cardiff, where he has had several one-man shows. He has also had long associations with the Mineta Move gallery in Brussels and with Il Polittico in Rome.

== Style ==
Holland's affinity with the art of the past is reflected in the genres and themes to which he habitually returns, namely the nude, still life and mythology.

The development of his realist style was much influenced by early study and copying of old masters, in particular the work of Titian and Velazquez. Many pictures carry conscious references to earlier masterpieces, as in Holland's use of the device of a mirror, intrinsic to the structure of his composition and at the same time conscious homage to Velazquez.

As well as his liking for classical allusions, Holland opts for classical precision, citing his admiration for the example of the 19th century French painter William-Adolphe Bourguereau. Nevertheless, Holland's output is seen as reflecting a wholly contemporary sensibility.

Frequently, Holland's figurative paintings – of women and men, but most often women, individually or in small groups – carry the implication of narrative. Yet, on closer engagement, nothing is defined as such but left open to interpretation. Against a neutral background, ostensibly a domestic setting but without the trappings of everyday living, subjects seem to be in transition, poised in doorways or portals, on landings or staircases or landings. Whether these are entrances or exits, what relationships might be involved, or how the dynamic of any transaction between those portrayed might have evolved is all open to speculation. Holland's manipulation of pictorial space further adds an enigmatic quality and an element of tension. There are implications – whether of a mystery, or dark secret hidden in the protagonists’ past – which the viewer only manages to perceive as the slightest of signs, an impression, or as a subtle but discomfiting metaphor.

That same ambiguity is also present in the still life paintings. In these, inanimate objects or installations can appear to take on human attributes. Holland's control of the medium has been compared both with the still lives of the 17th century, such as those of Chardin and, three centuries later, of Giorgio de Chirico. Italian writers also perceive a connection with the aesthetics of both the Italian movements of Pittura Metafisica and Arte Povera.

Goya's Los Caprichos were the original inspiration for Holland's figures-in-the-sky paintings, specifically Witches in Flight, 1797–98. In Holland's Caprices, multiple figures form complex groupings, poised in air. Each figure is legible individually, yet the heads, torso and limbs of the figures cede to those in immediate or close proximity, all carefully positioned and balanced. Groups of figures in boats are conceived in similar vein. The elemental quality of air and water also contributes to the particular atmosphere of all these paintings.

Holland's interest in portraying athleticism led to his painting practitioners of Cardiff's No Fit State circus, capturing key moments showing the physical strength, poise and coordination of the company's trapeze artists, acrobats and aerialists.

During the COVID-19 pandemic, Holland created portraits of key workers, in recognition of the vital role of the National Health Service. Holland donated one painting to the Arts for Health and Wellbeing programme at Cardiff and Vale University Health Board, saying that this was his way of saying thank you to the people who had cared for him since childhood and, most recently, had saved his life.

A series of these paintings of essential workers, made during lockdown, formed part of Holland's 80th birthday exhibition which opened at the Martin Tinney Gallery on 16 September 2021.

== Collections ==
- Fitzwilliam Museum
- Carmarthenshire County Museum
- Glynn Vivian Art Gallery
- Newport Museum and Art Gallery
- National Museum of Wales Cardiff
- National Library of Wales

== Publications ==
- 2006 Edward Lucie-Smith- Harry Holland
- 1991 Edward Lucie-Smith- Harry Holland The Painter and reality
