= William Leader =

William Leader (19 October 1767 – 18 January 1828) was a prosperous malt merchant and British Member of Parliament for Camelford and Winchelsea

He represented Camelford from 1812 to 1818, and Winchelsea from 1823 to 1826.

His father, William Leader, was coachmaker to the prince of Wales. Leader married in 1792 (his wife and mother both named Mary). He had two sons, William killed in a carriage accident at the age of 24, and John Temple Leader (1810–1903), and four daughters. Temple Leader and Leader's nephew William Leader Maberly (1798–1885) also became MPs.

His grave is in Putney Old Burial Ground.
