= John Temple Leader =

English politician and connoisseur

John Temple Leader (7 May 1810 – 1 March 1903) was an English politician and connoisseur.

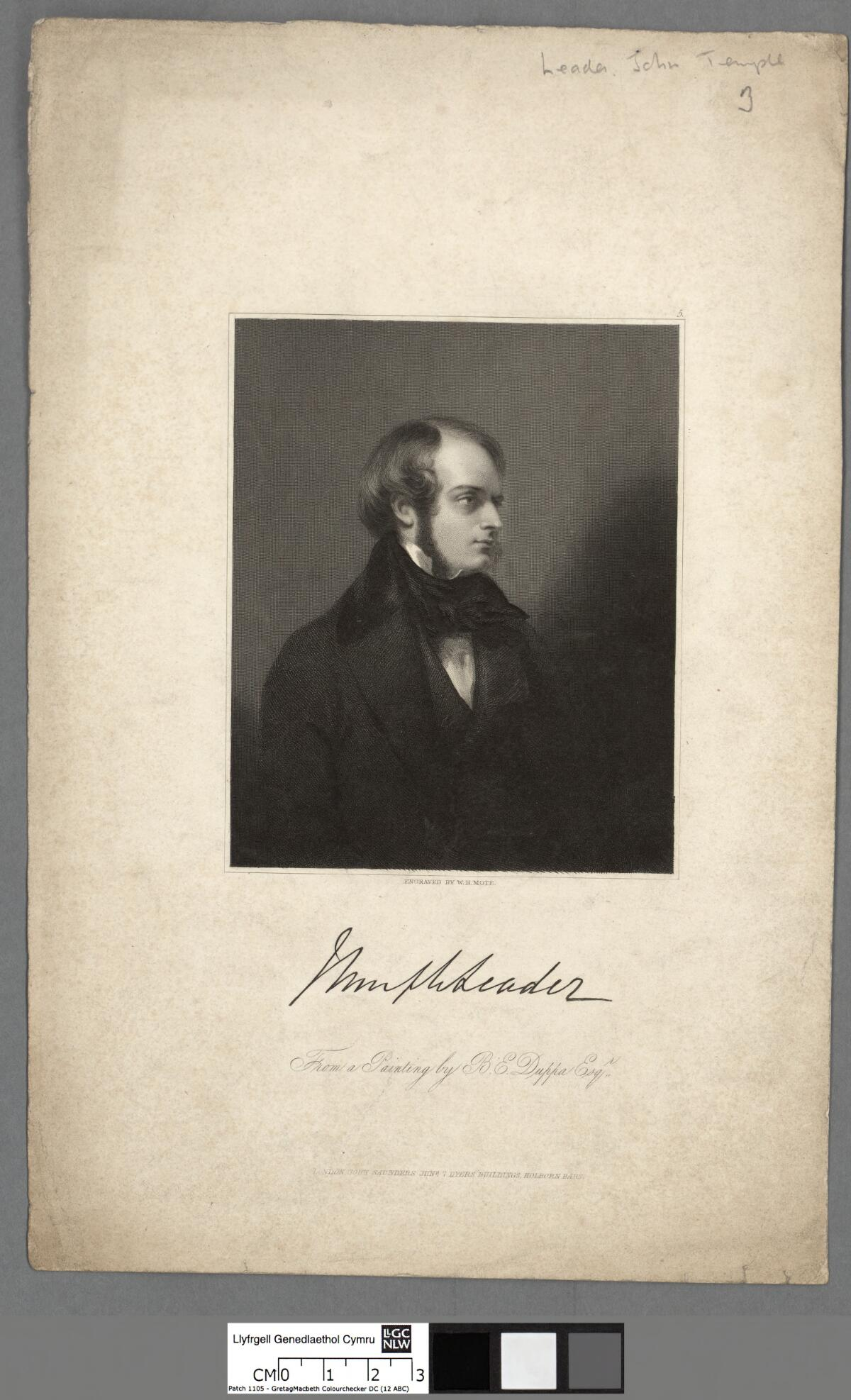
Portrait of J. Temple Leader

== Early life ==
Born at his father's house, Putney Hill Villa, on 7 May 1810, he was the younger son of Mary and William Leader, a London merchant, and Whig Member of Parliament for Camelford and then Winchelsea. He entered Charterhouse School in 1823, but left shortly to study with a private tutor, the Rev. Patrick Smyth, and visited Ireland, Norway, and France. The accidental death at Oxford of his older brother William in February 1826 made him heir to most of his father's large fortune, which he inherited on his father's death on 13 January 1828.

On 12 February 1828 Leader matriculated as a gentleman commoner at Christ Church, Oxford, meeting there James Robert Hope Scott, W. E. Gladstone, and Sir Stephen Glynne with whom he made archæological excursions. In his Oxford vacations he continued his travels, and was in Paris during the July Revolution of 1830; and there, through his father's friend Henry Brougham, he came to know leading liberal politicians. He took no degree, and after leaving Oxford went into politics.

== In politics ==
Leader attached himself to the advanced wing of the Radicals, and was elected Member of Parliament for Bridgwater in January 1835. In the House he generally acted with George Grote and William Molesworth of the Philosophical Radicals, and supported the People's Charter of 1838. In his first session he seconded Grote's resolution in favour of the secret ballot. John Arthur Roebuck found him a useful politician, if also frivolous. Other party friends complained that his political speeches were too bitter.

In May 1837 Leader applied for the Chiltern hundreds, in order to contest Westminster at a bye-election against Sir Francis Burdett. Having abandoned radical principles, Burdett had resigned the seat, and was asking his constituents to return him anew as a conservative. Leader was defeated, polling 3052 votes against 3567, but he renewed his candidature at the general election in August, when his opponent was Sir George Murray, and he was elected by 3793 against 2620. He was re-elected in July 1841, and remained the representative of Westminster till the dissolution in 1847. He continued to advocate Chartism and radicalism. On 2 May 1842 he seconded Thomas Duncombe's motion "that the petitioners for the national charter be heard at the bar of the house". In the same session (18 February) he supported Charles Pelham Villiers's motion for the repeal of the corn laws. On 13 February 1844 he spoke in behalf of the liberties of Canada, which he joined Roebuck in championing. He was not heard in the house again.

== In society ==
While in the House Leader was prominent in London society, and extended his acquaintance on tours in Italy and France. In 1836 he joined the Reform Club, of which he was a lifelong member. In February 1837, as a disciple of Brougham and Grote, he was admitted to the first council of the new London University, and in the same month he presided at a dinner for Thomas Wakley, which was attended by Daniel O'Connell, Joseph Hume and other radicals.

His friendship with Brougham grew, and he was his only companion, on 21 October 1839, in the carriage accident near Brougham Hall, Cumberland, which led to the incorrect report of Brougham's death. He entertained at his residence at Putney and at a house which he rented in Stratton Street; his friend Edward John Trelawny long lived with him at Putney. Other guests there included Richard Monckton Milnes, Charles Austin, and overseas visitors; he saw much in London of Louis Napoleon, and knew Gabriele Rossetti.

== Withdrawal to France and Italy ==
In 1844 Leader moved abroad, without explanation, and returned only briefly during the rest of his life. At first he spent time at Cannes with his friend Brougham, and there Richard Cobden met them both in 1846; like Brougham, Leader acquired property there. He then moved on to Florence.

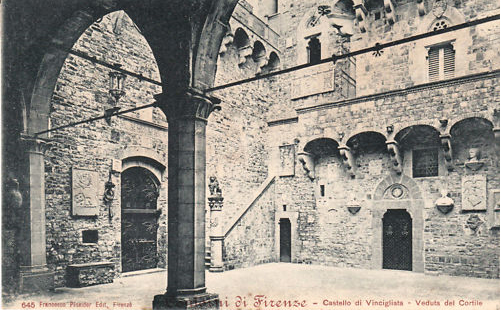
The courtyard of Vincigliata Castle in 1901

In Florence and its environs Leader purchased old buildings of historic interest, restored them, and filled them with works of art and antiquities. On 16 February 1850 he bought the old Villa Pazzi, in the village of Majano near Florence. On 5 March 1855 he purchased the ruined medieval castle of Vincigliata, in 1857 a house in the Piazza dei Pitti in Florence itself, and on 8 April 1862, the Villa Catanzaro, also at Majano. All were practically rebuilt under his supervision. In 1854 he was given what would become Villa I Tatti half a century later. The two houses at Majano were each renamed Villa Temple Leader. The restoration at Vincigliata was the work of Giuseppi Fancelli, son of the steward of Leader's Florentine estates, whom he had had trained as an architect. Queen Victoria signed the visitor's book at Vincigliata on 15 April 1888. Leader was rewarded with the knight commandership of the crown of Italy, by Victor Emmanuel II.

== Death ==
Leader died at 14 Piazza dei Pitti, Florence, on 1 March 1903, aged 92. Late in life he had adopted the Roman Catholic faith, and he was buried with Catholic rites.

== Legacy ==
Leader's fortune amounted to £250,000. He made bequests to educational and charitable institutions in Florence, including money for the restoration of the central bronze door of the Duomo. The rest of his property in England and Italy, including Vincigliata, was bequeathed to his great-nephew Richard Luttrell Pilkington Bethell, 3rd Baron Westbury.

There is a public park named after Leader and land of his original estate: Leader's Gardens in Putney.

== Works ==
A biography of Sir John Hawkwood, Giovanni Acuto, came out in Italian at Florence in 1889 in the names of Leader and Giuseppe Marcotti; it was translated into English by Leader Scott in 1889. His Life of Sir Robert Dudley, Duke of Northumberland (Florence, 1895), acknowledges in the preface Leader Scott's assistance. An Italian translation appeared at Florence in 1896.

== Family ==
On 19 August 1867 Leader married, on a rare visit to London, by special licence, Maria Louisa di Leoni, widow of Count Antonio di Leoni and daughter of Constantine Raimondi. She died at Florence on 5 February 1906, without issue.

== Notes ==
Attribution

This article incorporates text from a publication now in the public domain: Lee, Sidney, ed. (1912). "Leader, John Temple". Dictionary of National Biography (2nd supplement). Vol. 2. London: Smith, Elder & Co.
