= Houblon =

Houblon is a surname. Notable people of this surname include:

- Abraham Houblon (1640–11 May 1722), Governor of the Bank of England, brother of James and John
- Sir James Houblon (1629–1700), MP, Director of the Bank of England, brother of Abraham and John
- Sir John Houblon (1632–1712), first Governor of the Bank of England, brother of Abraham and James
- Jacob Houblon (1710–1770), MP
- John Archer-Houblon (1773–1831), MP, descendant of the Bank of England Houblons
- Thomas Archer Houblon (1849–1933), Archdeacon of Oxford

== See also ==
- Houblon's Almshouses, Richmond
- Houblon Apartments, part of the Relay Building, Whitechapel, London
