= Whipps Cross =

Area of East London, England

Coordinates: 51.581539°N 0.000476°E

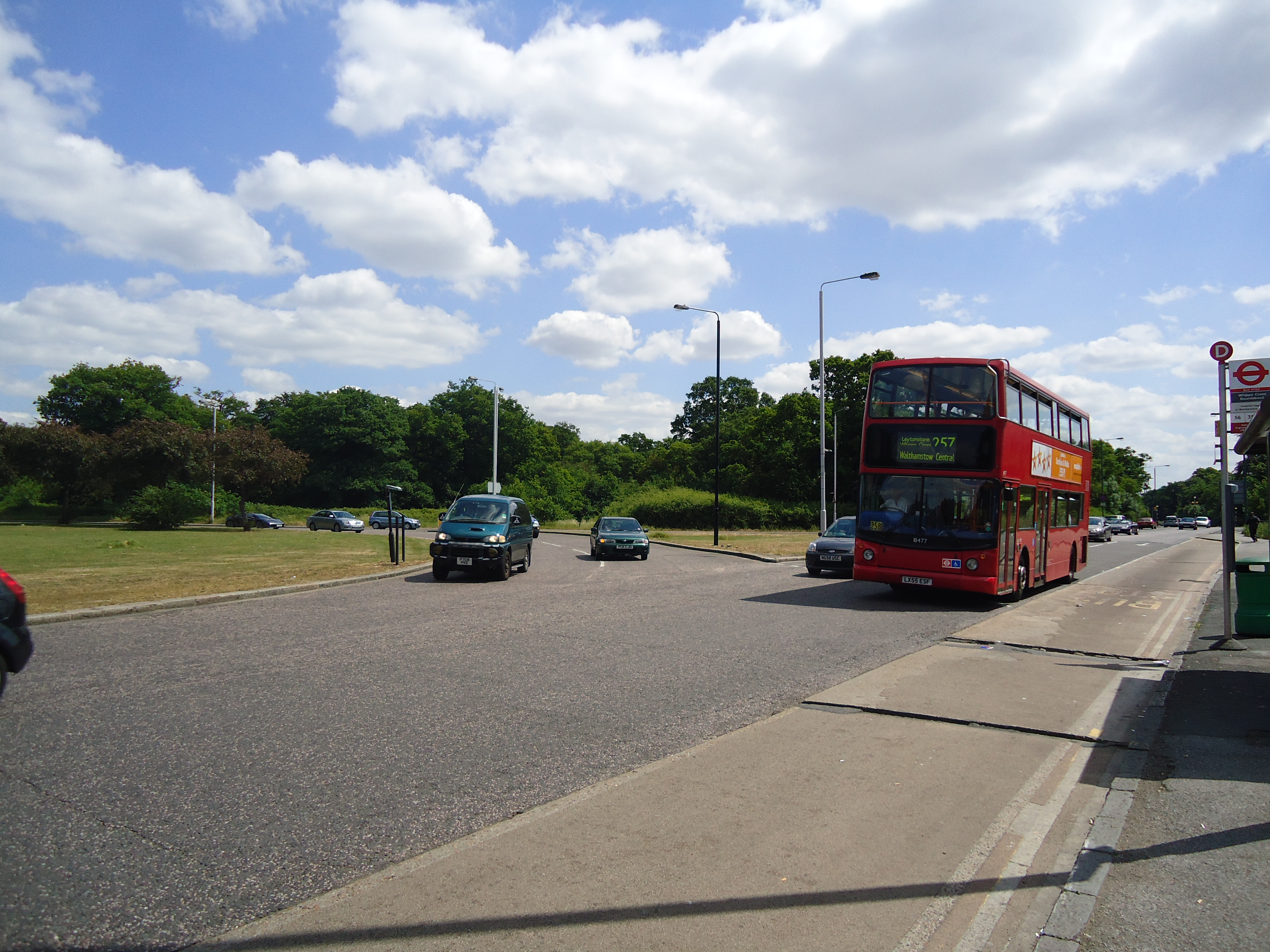
- Whipps Cross junction looking east towards Whipps Cross Road and the hospital

- Location within Greater London
- OS grid reference: TQ387888
- London borough: Waltham Forest
- Ceremonial county: Greater London
- Region: London
- Country: England
- Sovereign state: United Kingdom
- Post town: LONDON
- Postcode district: E10, E11, E17
- Dialling code: 020
- Police: Metropolitan
- Fire: London
- Ambulance: London
- UK Parliament: Leyton and Wanstead Walthamstow
- London Assembly: North East

Whipps Cross is an area of the districts of Leytonstone and Walthamstow in the London Borough of Waltham Forest in east London, England. It is most famous for Whipps Cross University Hospital. Prior to 1965, it was located in the historic county of Essex.

== The area ==
The name Whipps Cross specifically applies to the junction of Lea Bridge Road (A104) with Whipps Cross Road (A114) and Wood Street (B160). It lay on the boundary of the former civil parishes and Municipal Boroughs of Walthamstow and Leyton, which were both incorporated into Waltham Forest in 1965. It is the highest point in Leyton at 63 metres (207 ft) above sea level.

The area to the south and west of Whipps Cross is residential, mainly terraced housing built in the late 19th and early 20th centuries. On the south side of the Whipps Cross junction is a large Victorian house which is used as a Territorial Army Centre by 68 Signal Squadron of the Inns of Court & City Yeomanry. Adjacent to this building is a war memorial in the form of a Celtic cross, to the 7th Battalion, the Essex Regiment (Territorial) and other local Territorial Army units of both World Wars. It bears the inscription "We are the dead. To you with failing hands we throw the torch; be yours to hold it high." This memorial was moved from Church Hill, Walthamstow when the TA drill hall there closed in the 1950s.

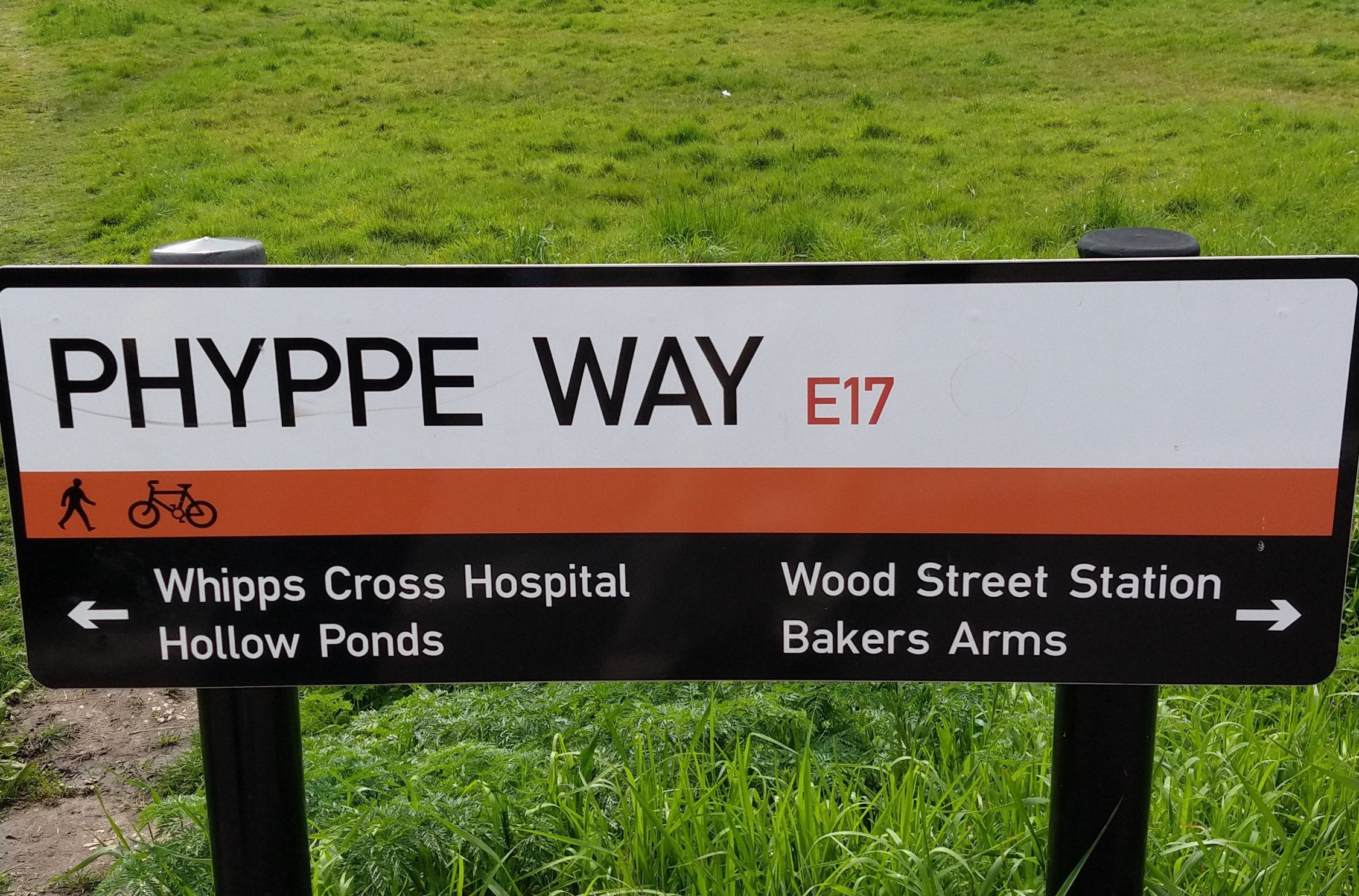
Road sign at Whipps Cross commemorating the original name of the area

The area to the south and east of the junction, on the southern side of Whipps Cross Road, was once the site of Forest House but has for the last century been occupied by Whipps Cross Hospital. To the north and east of Whipps Cross is an area of Epping Forest called Leyton Flats, which features a lake created from old gravel pits officially called Hollow Pond (often referenced as 'Hollow Ponds' locally).

Between 2017 and the spring of 2019, a major reconstruction converted the junction from a roundabout to a junction controlled by traffic lights. The work included dedicated cycle lanes from every direction and was part of a £15 million improvement plan for Lea Bridge Road.

== Origin of the name ==
The name is first mentioned in local records of the late fourteenth century as Phip's cross, referring to a wayside cross set up by a member of the family of one John Phyppe. Further versions on maps and deeds are Phyppys Crosse in 1517, Fypps Chrosse 1537, Phippes Cross 1572, and finally Whipps Cross by 1636. The change in the initial consonant is thought to have been a product of the local Essex dialect at that time, in which "F" sounds were pronounced as "W". These early examples disprove a local legend, which supposes that the name derives from it being the place where those found guilty of breaking the forest laws were whipped.

== Forest House ==
The Forest House estate lay to the south of Whipps Cross Road and west of James Lane. It has its origins in a lease of land granted by the Abbot of Stratford Langthorne Abbey in 1492. Forrest House had been built by 1568 and was rebuilt before 1625. In 1658, George Goring, 1st Earl of Norwich acquired the estate by marriage. His second son, Charles, Lord Goring, enlarged the estate and is buried in Leyton Parish Church. Ownership of Forest House passed to Sir Henry Capell who sold it to James Houblon in 1682, who immediately started to build a new house on the site in the English Baroque style with a Doric porch. Houblon was a wealthy City merchant of Huguenot descent, whose sons John and Abraham were born at Forest House. In 1703, the estate was sold to Sir Gilbert Heathcote, the last Lord Mayor of London to ride on horseback at the Lord Mayor's Show. The estate was sold to the Bosanquet family in 1743, and it remained in their hands until 1889, when it was sold to the West Ham Board of Guardians who established a work house there. During World War I, the work house infirmary was used to treat wounded soldiers and this became Whipps Cross Hospital in 1917. In that year, it was visited by King George V and Queen Mary. The mansion itself became a ward for male mental patients. It was finally demolished in 1964 and only part of the garden wall (thought to date from 1641) remains.

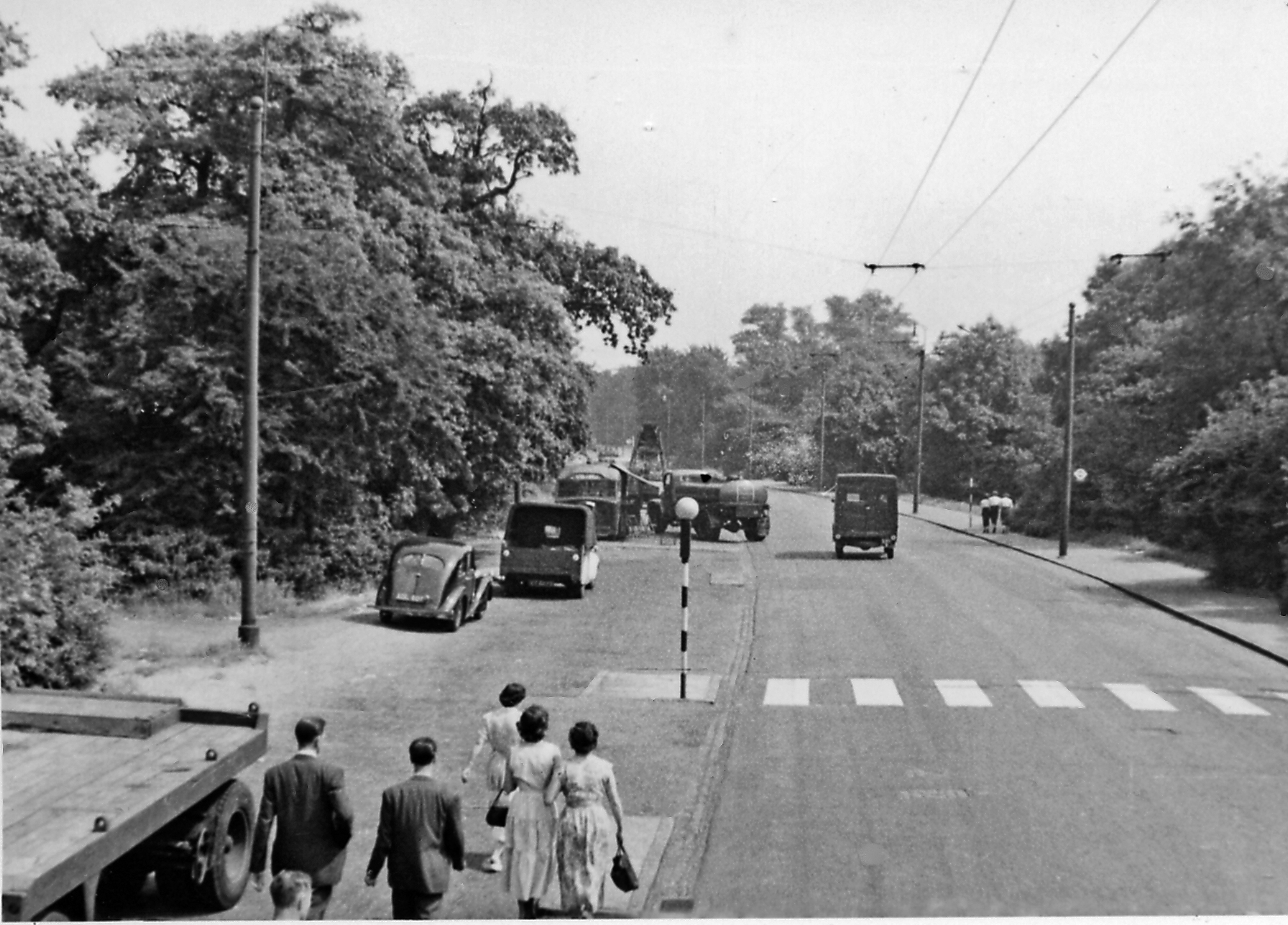
Whipps Cross in 1955

== Whipps Cross Lido ==
In 1905, a swimming pond was excavated by manual labour as part of an unemployment relief scheme. It was located to the north of the Hollow Pond, close to the junction of Lea Bridge Road and Snaresbrook Road. It was locally known as "the Batho", but it became notorious for being muddy and unhygienic.

In 1923, the borough councils of Leyton and Walthamstow jointly agreed to fund its improvement, and in May 1932, a new lido or open-air swimming pool was opened by the Lord Mayor of London.

At a cost of £6,000, it was an irregular oval shape with a 100-yard (91 m) straight section for racing; a paved surround and changing rooms were built and the pool was fed by an underground spring. However, the new lido was closed in the following September, after a water sample had shown it to be "unfit for bathing purposes".

After another rebuilding, including the sealing of the floor of the pool with concrete and the installation of a chlorination plant, Whipps Cross Lido reopened in 1937. It was a very large pool, 300 feet (91 m) long by 130 feet (40 m) wide, with a connected circular diving pool 30 feet (9.1 m) deep. The pool had a capacity of 1,300,000 gallons, putting it in the top ten of largest lidos by capacity in the UK.

In 1965, a children's paddling pool and a junior swimming bath were incorporated into the lido at a cost of £7,000. This was achieved by installing a 1.2m (4ft.) wide partition across the existing pool.

By 1981, attendances had fallen to 20,000 per annum and the decision was taken to close the lido on 4 September 1982. By December 1983, the site had been levelled and returned to forest land; only part of the access road remains. The location can be seen at the georeferenced map link.
