= Duquesne =

Duquesne or Duchesne (/djuːˈkeɪn/ dew-KAYN, French: [dykɛːn]; old spelling Du Quesne, American spelling DuQuesne) is a family name derived from a northern dialectal form of French (Norman and Picard) meaning du chêne in French ("of the oak").

The anglicization of the name to Du Cane occurred following the exodus of Huguenot refugees from France to England in the 16th and 17th centuries.

These can refer to:

== People ==
- Abraham Duquesne (c. 1610–1688), French admiral
- Abraham de Bellebat, marquis du Quesne, governor of Martinique in 1716 (see list of colonial and departmental heads of Martinique)
- Antoine Duquesne (1941–2010), Belgian politician
- Fritz Joubert Duquesne (1877–1956), Boer and later German spy in World War I and World War II
- Jacques Duquesne (footballer) (1940-2023), Belgian footballer
- Jean du Quesne, the elder (died 1624), Huguenot refugee from Flanders who settled in England
- Jean du Quesne, the Younger (1575–1612), son of the above
- Michel-Ange Duquesne de Menneville, Marquis Du Quesne (c. 1700–1778), Governor General of New France and namesake of numerous settlements

== Places ==
=== United States ===
- Duquesne, Arizona, now a ghost town
- Duquesne, Missouri, a village
- Duquesne, Pennsylvania, a city named after Marquis Duquesne
- Fort Duquesne, a French fort created in 1754 which eventually became the city of Pittsburgh
- Fort Duquesne (Minnesota), a former French fur trade post on the National Register of Historic Places

=== Grenada ===
- Duquesne River

== Fictional characters ==
- Calleigh Duquesne, in the television series CSI: Miami
- Jacques Duquesne, true identity of the Swordsman (character) in the Marvel Comics universe
- Marc "Blackie" DuQuesne, villain of the Skylark science fiction series of novels by E. E. "Doc" Smith

== French Navy ships ==
- French ship Duquesne, various French Navy ships
- Duquesne-class cruiser, a class of two heavy cruisers built in the mid 1920s
- Duquesne-class cruiser (1876), a class of two unprotected cruisers built in the 1870s

== Sports ==
- Duquesne Country and Athletic Club, an American professional football team from 1895 to 1900
- Duquesne Country and Athletic Club (ice hockey), an American hockey team from 1895 to 1901
- Duquesne Dukes, athletic teams of Duquesne University
- Duquesne Athletic Club, a professional ice hockey team in Pittsburgh, Pennsylvania from 1908 to 1909
- Duquesne Gardens, the main sports arena in Pittsburgh, Pennsylvania, in the first half of the 20th century
- Duquesne Baseball Field, Duquesne University

== Other uses ==
- Duquesne University, a private Catholic university in Pittsburgh, Pennsylvania
- Duquesne Club, a private social club in Pittsburgh, Pennsylvania, founded in 1873
- Duquesne Brewing Company (1899-1972), a brewery in Pittsburgh
- Duquesne Brewing Company, revived from the above company
- Duquesne (PRR), a Pennsylvania Railroad passenger train, later renamed the Keystone by Amtrak
- Duquesne Incline, an inclined plane railroad or funicular
