= Lochiel, Arizona =

- Populated place
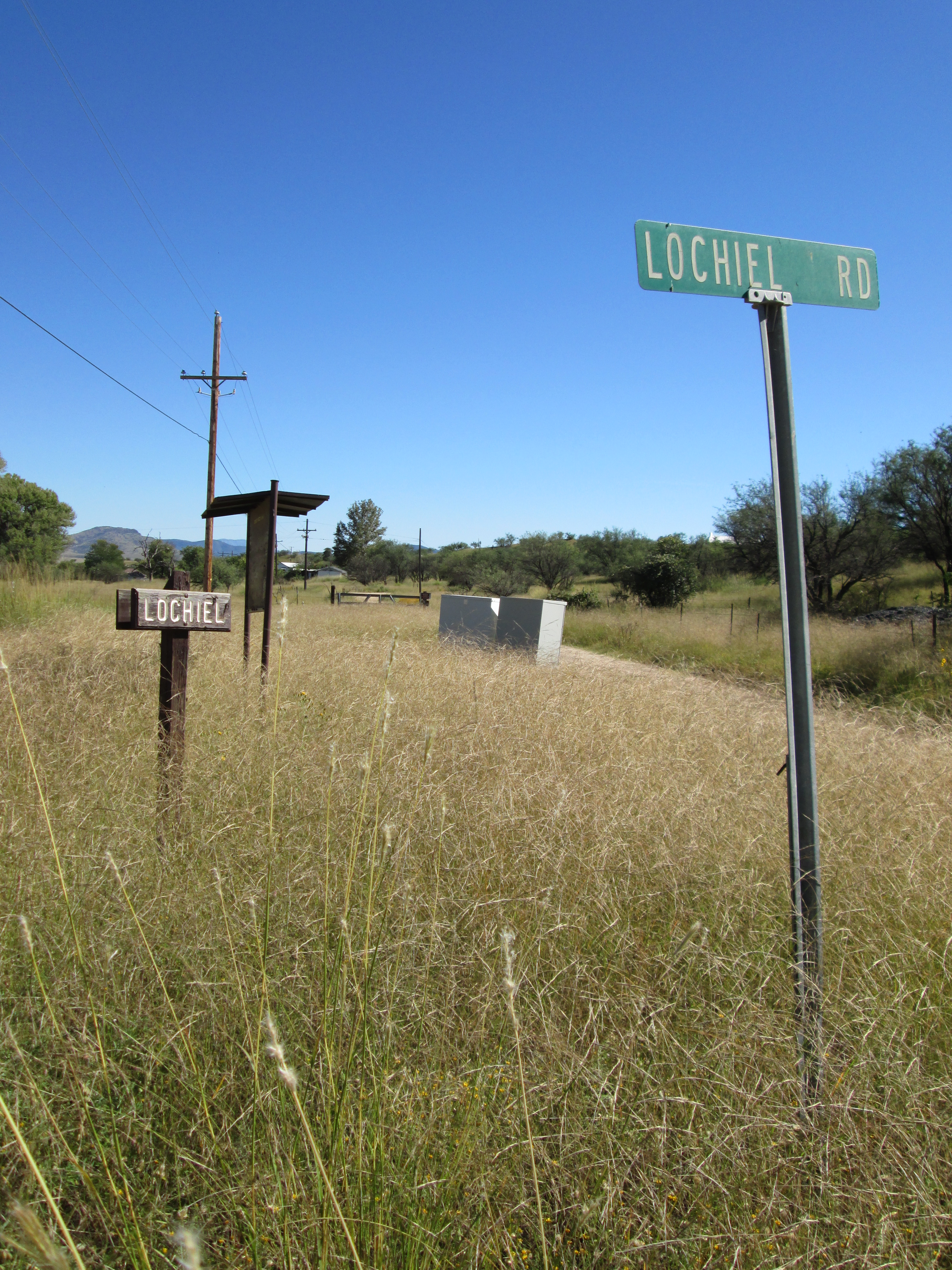
- Road signs in Lochiel. Part of the town and the international border can be seen in the background.

- Location within Arizona Location within the United States
- Coordinates: 31°20′08″N 110°37′26″W
- Country: United States
- State: Arizona
- County: Santa Cruz
- Elevation: 4,685 ft (1,428 m)
- Time zone: UTC-7 (Mountain (MST))
- FIPS code: 04-41750
- GNIS feature ID: 31163

Lochiel is a populated place and former border crossing in southern Santa Cruz County, Arizona, United States, approximately 25 miles east of Nogales. Basically a ghost town, the townsite is located in the southwestern part of the San Rafael Valley on Washington Gulch, about 1.5 miles west of the Santa Cruz River. It was first settled in the late-1870s and mostly abandoned by 1986. The town served the ranches of the San Rafael Valley and the Washington Camp and Duquesne mining towns of the Patagonia Mountains, approximately five miles to the northwest up Washington Gulch.

In 2026, Lochiel has made national news as a site where activists have halted border wall construction through a tree-sit protest.

== Name ==
The present-day Lochiel was originally known by local Mexican settlers as La Noria, which is Spanish for a wheel-drawn well, and later as Luttrell, before being renamed "Lochiel" by the rancher Colin Cameron in 1884. Lochiel is the main branch of Clan Cameron, some of the chiefs of which − such as Donald Cameron of Lochiel − figure prominently in Scottish history.

== History ==
The Lochiel area was originally inhabited by a small community of Mexican ranchers before a smelting works was erected in the late 1870s to serve the nearby mines in the Patagonia Mountains, bringing in American settlers. By 1881, a town by the name of Luttrell had formed and was home to some 400 people, most of whom worked in the smelter or in the mines, as well as five stores, three saloons, a brewery, a butcher shop, a bakery, livery stables, and a boarding house operated by Dr. James Monroe Luttrell, for whom the town was originally named.

In 1884 the cattle baron Colin Cameron established the San Rafael Ranch about a mile north of Luttrell. That same year he managed to have the postmaster in town rename it “Lochiel," after his homeland back in Scotland. Several years after that, the international boundary between Sonora and Arizona was surveyed and it was found that half of the settlement was in Mexican territory. The town was then split in two. La Noria became the name of the Mexican part of town while the American side continued to be known as Lochiel.

In the early 1910s, Pancho Villa and his men rustled cattle and horses in the area on more than one occasion. By this time, the famed businessman William Cornell Greene had acquired ownership of the San Rafael Ranch to use as his headquarters for his cattle ranching empire. The ranch remained in the ownership of Greene's family all the way up until 1998, when it was sold to The Nature Conservancy and Arizona State Parks for use as a nature preserve.

A few people still live in Lochiel to this day. In addition to a collection of old houses, Lochiel is the site of an adobe one-room schoolhouse, a teacherage, an old adobe church and cemetery, and an abandoned U.S. Customs station. Lochiel is also the site where Fray Marcos de Niza first entered what is now Arizona. A large memorial just to the west of town was erected in his honor in 1939 by the National Youth Administration.

== Gallery ==
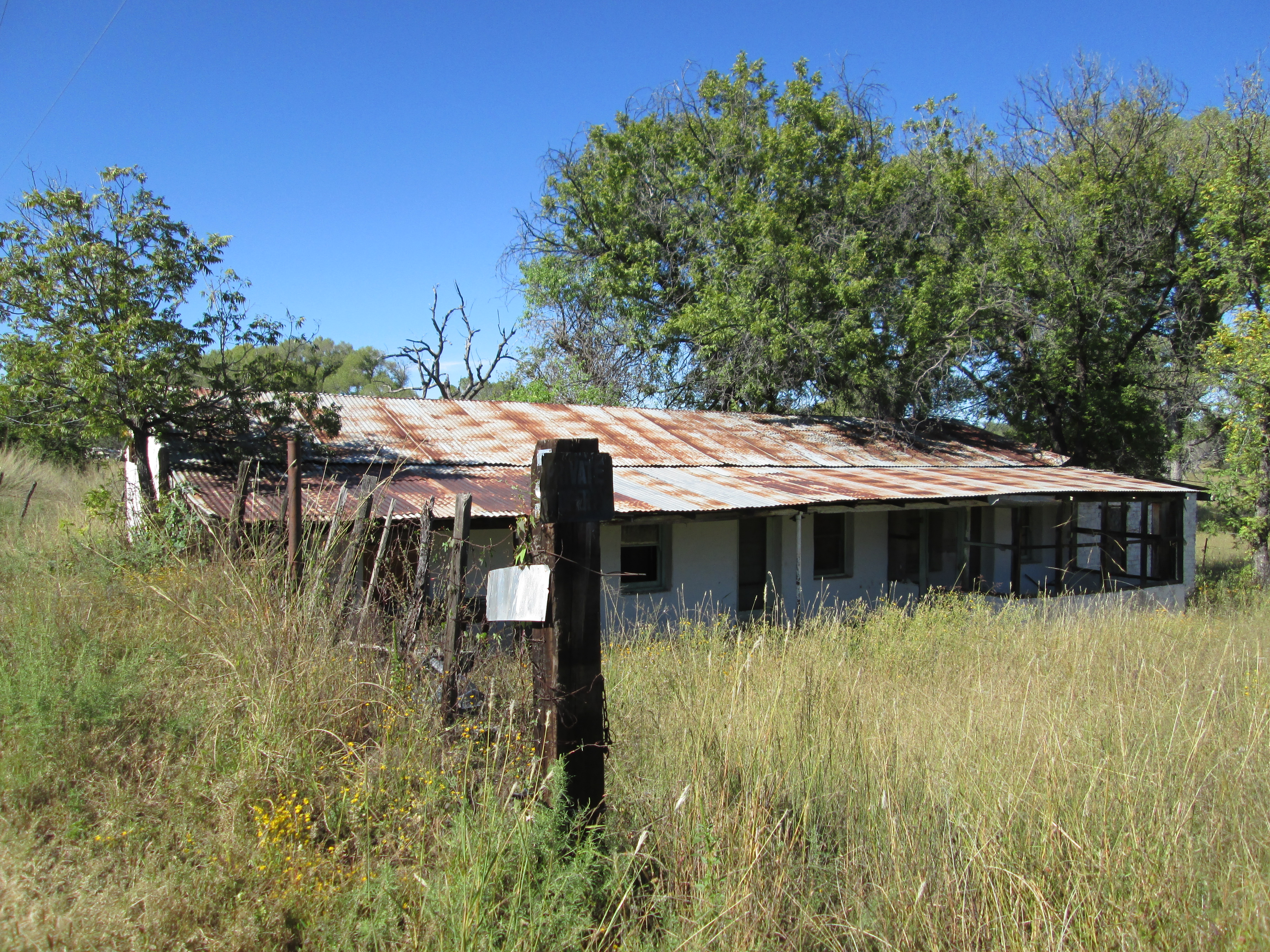
The U.S. Customs station.

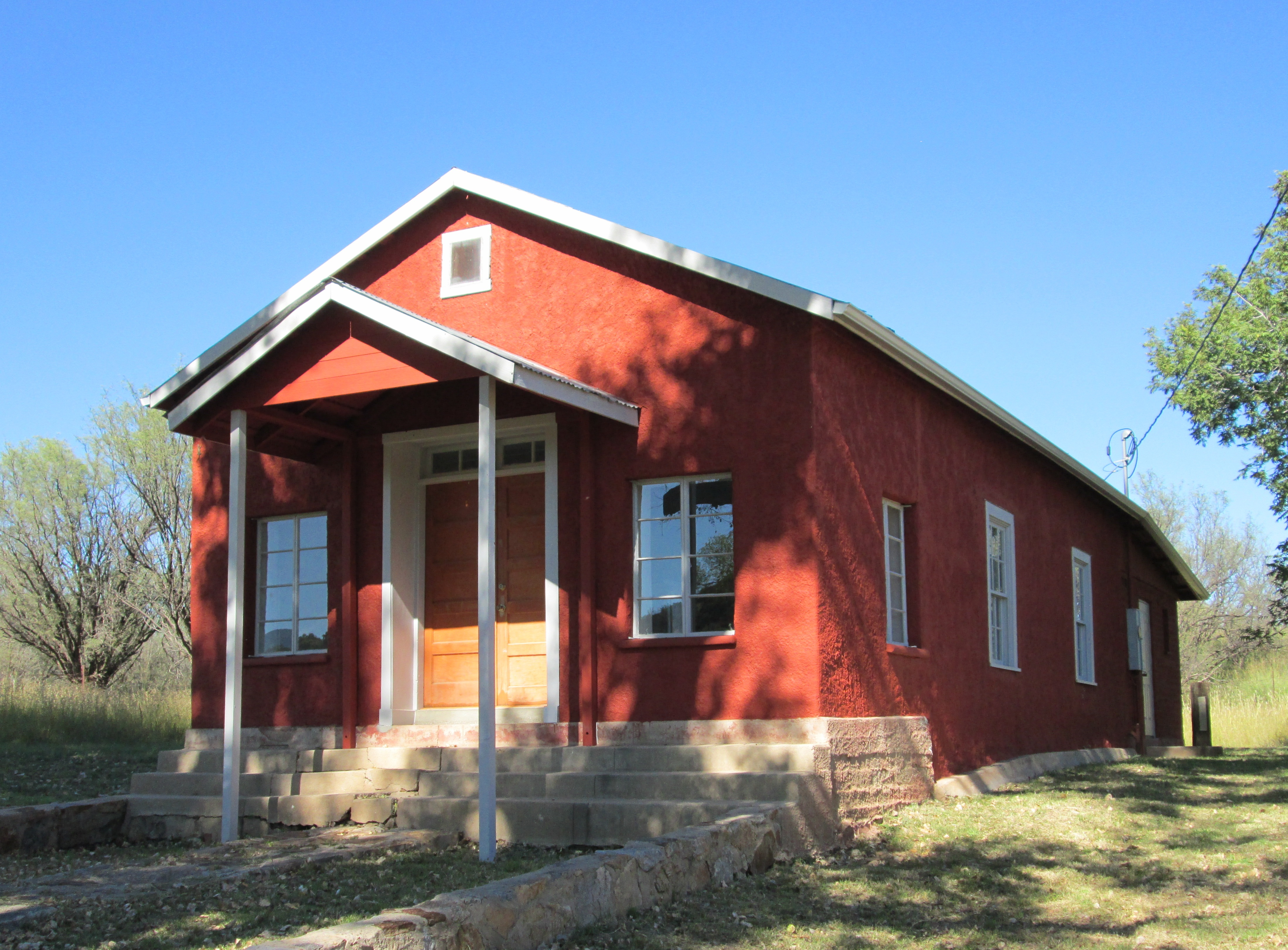
The one-room schoolhouse, built sometime before 1905.

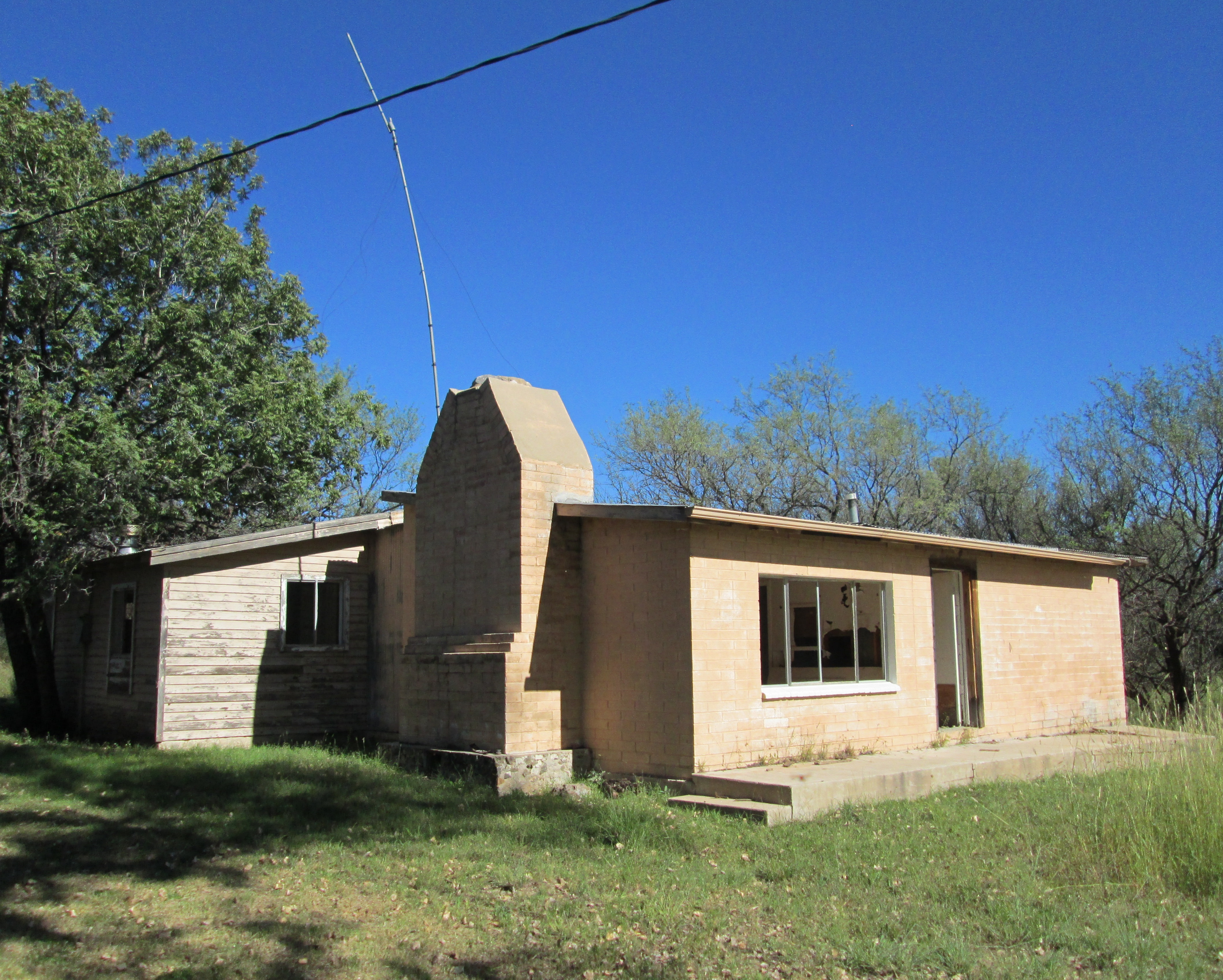
The teacherage next to the schoolhouse.

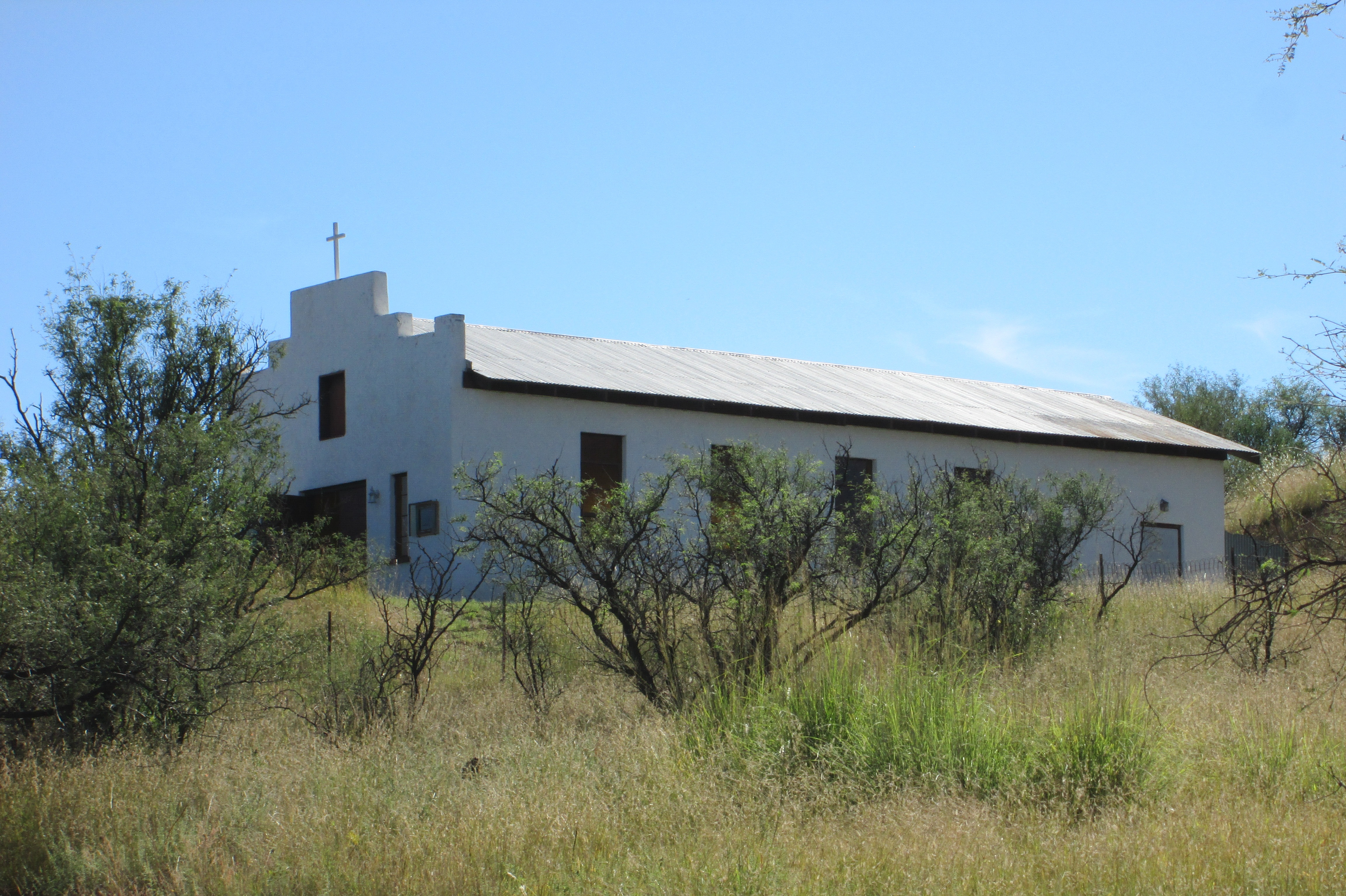
An old adobe church.

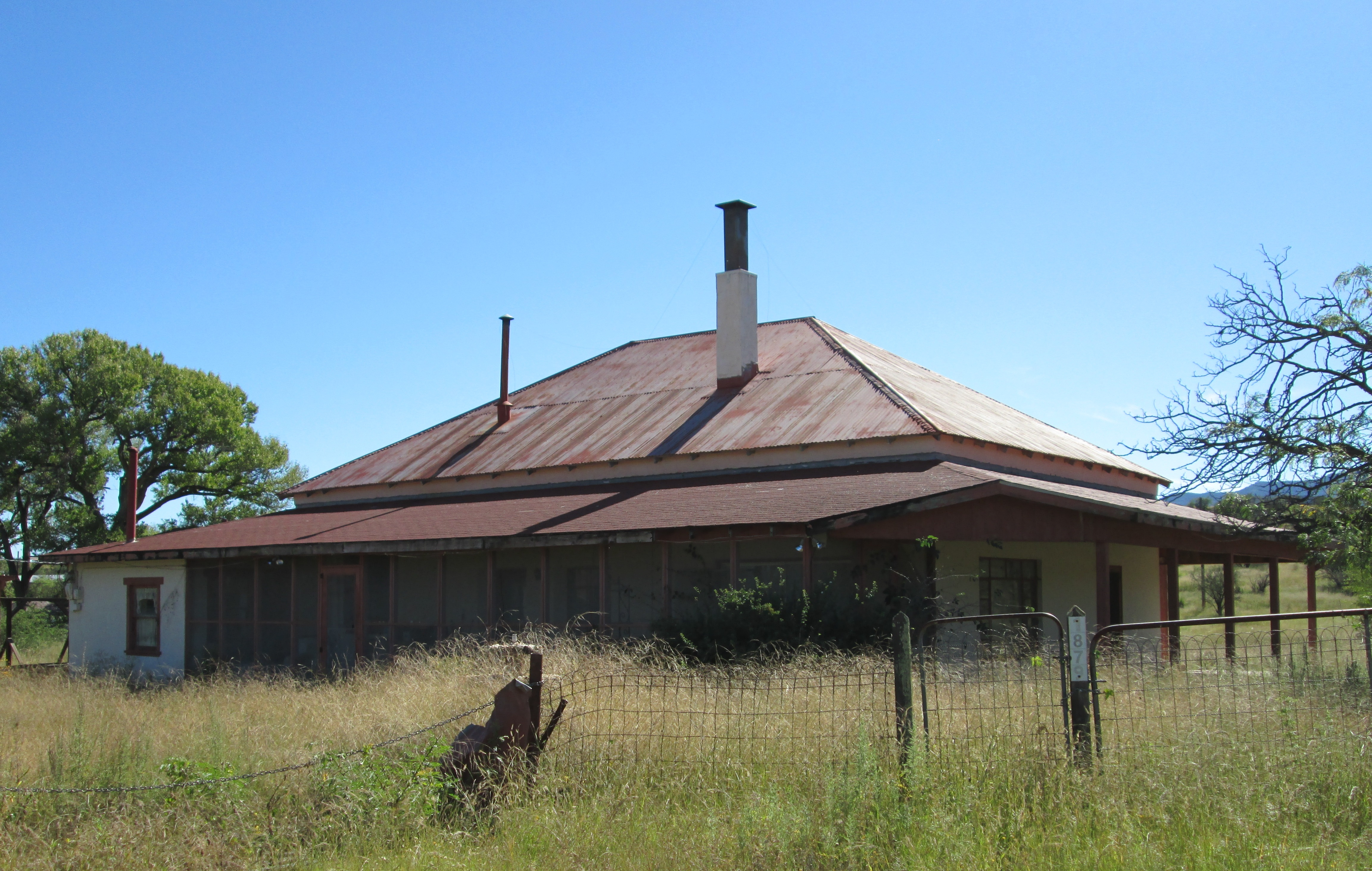
The Sunwest Ranch House in Lochiel.

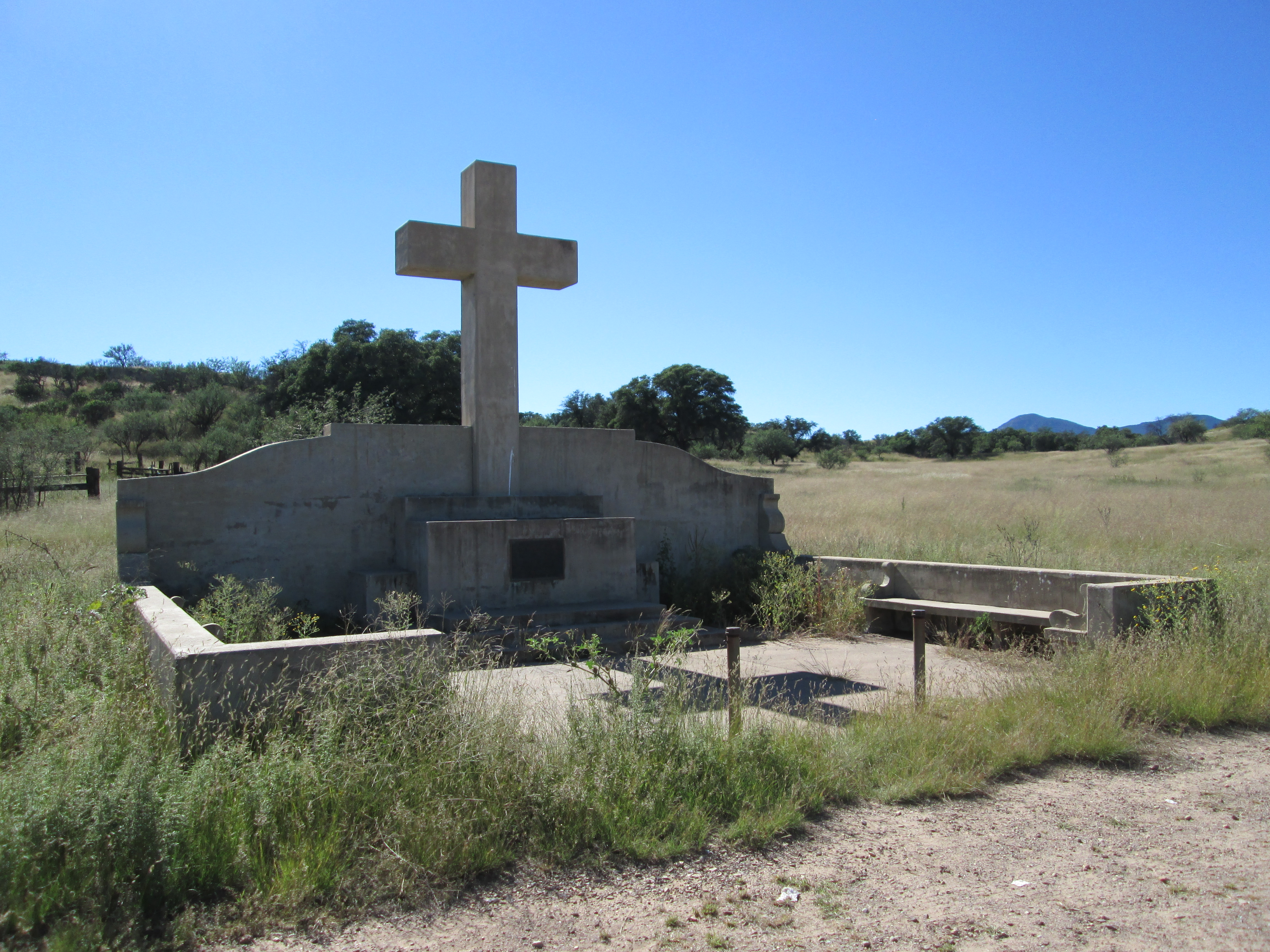
The monument to Fray Marcos de Niza, the first European west of the Rocky Mountains.

== See also ==
- List of ghost towns in Arizona
