= Peter Du Cane =

Peter Du Cane may refer to:

- Peter Du Cane, the elder (1645–1714), Huguenot businessman in London
- Peter Du Cane Sr. (1713–1803), British merchant and businessman
- Peter Du Cane (boat designer) (1901–1984), British boat designer

== See also ==
- Peter Cain (disambiguation)
- Peter Kane (disambiguation)
