= Du Cane =

Du Cane or du Cane is a surname. Notable people with the surname include:

== People ==
- Alfred du Cane (1835–1882), English clergyman and cricketer
- Charles Du Cane (1825–1889), British politician
- Edmund Frederick Du Cane (1830–1903), British Army major general
- Ella Du Cane (1874–1943), British artist
- John Du Cane (1865–1947), British Army general
- Peter Du Cane, the elder (1645–1714), Huguenot businessman in London
- Peter Du Cane Sr. (1713–1803), British merchant and businessman
- Peter Du Cane (boat designer) (1901–1984), British boat designer
- Richard Du Cane (1681–1744), British politician

== See also ==
- Ducane Products Co., a company acquired by Weber Inc.
- Du Kane, member of the British techno-dance group Beautiful People
- Duquesne (disambiguation)
