= Jean du Quesne, the elder =

Jean du Quesne, the elder (died December 1624), also known as Jan or Jehan, was a particularly well-documented Huguenot refugee from Flanders reported to be from Ath in Hainaut, the son of Jean Du Quesne, native of Valenciennes.

Of noble extraction, Du Quesne escaped to England in 1568 during the reign of Queen Elizabeth I following the Low Country persecutions of Protestants under Fernando Álvarez de Toledo, 3rd Duke of Alba. A historical record of Du Quesne's flight and of the sale of his goods and furniture in 1569, as well as the letting of his "maison, chambre, estatte et jardin" (house, bedroom, estate, and garden) is contained in the Belgian Archives.

Du Quesne originally settled in Canterbury where he served as an elder of the French Church. He was married to Judith Millon (died 2 May 1627) and they had three children: Jean du Quesne, the younger, David and Marie, mother of John Houblon, first Governor of the Bank of England. The family soon migrated to London, settling in Old Jewry. They became active in the French Church on Threadneedle Street.

Of the same Huguenot family that produced the famous French Admiral, Marquis Abraham Duquesne, Jean Du Quesne was also the patriarch of its English branch, which came to be known as "Du Cane" (an early 17th-century anglicization of the original family name) and included several prominent men of business and politics. The Du Cane family played a prominent role in the founding of the Bank of England and the East India Company, as well as in British politics of the 18th and 19th centuries. His descendants include John Houblon, first Governor of the Bank of England, Peter Du Cane, the elder, an Alderman of the City of London in 1666, several Members of Parliament including Sir Richard Du Cane in the 18th century and Sir Charles Du Cane in the 19th century who also served as Royal Governor of Tasmania from 1868 to 1874. Others of his direct descendants became senior British military officers, including Major-General Sir Edmund Frederick Du Cane (1830-1903) and General Sir John Du Cane (1865-1947), who was also Aide-de-Camp General to the King from 1926 to 1930.

During the 18th century, the family became landed in Essex with estates in Coggeshall and Great Braxted.
