= Peter Kane (disambiguation) =

Peter Kane (1918–1991) was a boxer.

Peter Kane may also refer to:

- Peter Kane (footballer) (born 1939), Scottish former footballer
- Peter Kane (magician) (1938–2004), British magician

== See also ==
- Peter Cain (disambiguation)
- Peter Du Cane (disambiguation)
