= Peter Cain =

Peter Cain may refer to:

- Peter Cain (figure skater) (born 1958), Australian skater
- Peter Cain (artist) (1959–1997), American artist
- Peter Cain (politician) (born 1954), Australian politician

== See also ==
- Peter Kane (disambiguation)
- Peter Du Cane (disambiguation)
