= James Bateman (banker) =

English merchant and politician

Sir James Bateman (29 April 1660 – 10 November 1718) was an English merchant and politician who sat in the House of Commons from 1711 to 1718. He became Lord Mayor of London and Governor of the Bank of England.

== Early years ==
Bateman was the son of Joas (anglicised to Joseph) Bateman of Tooting and his second wife, Judith de la Barre, daughter of John de la Barre, merchant, of Fenchurch Street. He was born and baptised the same day at St Martin Orgar in London. His father was a Flemish immigrant who had become a successful London merchant and alderman. Bateman built upon his father's mercantile business. From about 1683 or 1684 he was living at Alicante in Spain, where he was involved in the wine trade. By the early 1690s he was back in London with a considerable fortune and carried on as an importer of wine from the Iberian peninsula. He married Esther Searle, the daughter and coheiress of John Searle, a Finchley merchant by licence dated 3 December 1691.

== Career ==
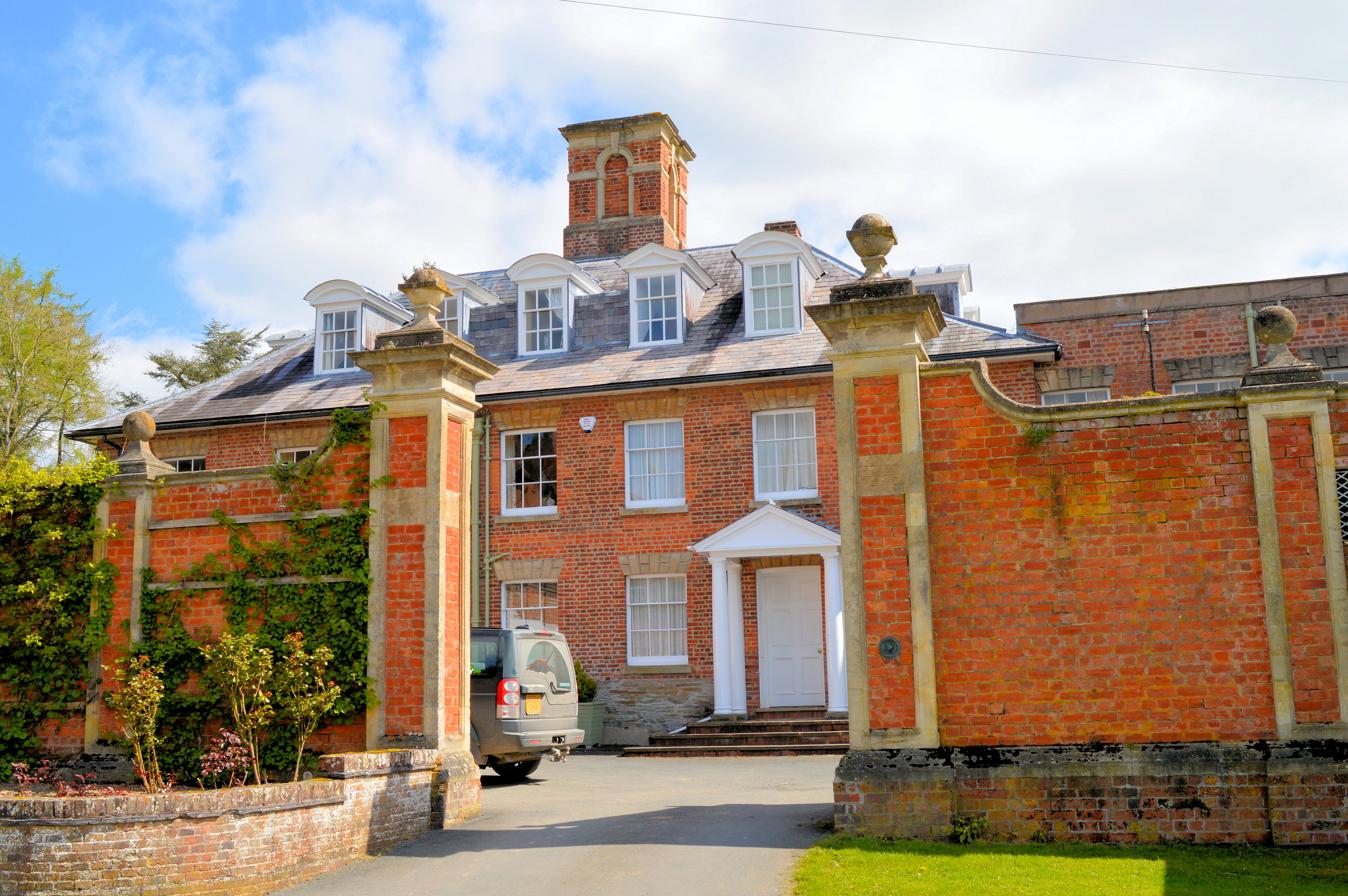
Shobdon Court service block

Bateman became an important player in the City of London and, subscribing to the Bank of England on its foundation in 1694, became one of its founding directors. He also began to dabble in politics. At the 1695 election he contested Totnes unsuccessfully. However, he was nearly impeached in 1695 because of his involvement with the Company of Scotland. He was active in establishing an alternative East India Company and in 1698 was a founding director of the New East Indies Company. He was knighted on 14 December 1698. At the first general election of 1701 he stood unsuccessfully at St Mawes. He seems to have decided to concentrate on City politics instead and was appointed Sheriff of London for 1701 to 1702, elected Deputy Governor of the Bank of England for 1703 to 1705 and Governor for 1705 to 1707. In 1705 he bought the Shobdon estate in Herefordshire and replaced the Jacobean house with a new Palladian style building, of which only the service block has survived. He resumed his position as a director of the Bank of England in 1707 until 1711. In 1708, he became an alderman and a member of the Loriners’ Company. He was a director of the United East India Company from 1709 to 1710, a prime warden of the Fishmongers’ Company for 1710 to 1712 and resigned as Director of the Bank of England in 1711 to become a sub-Governor of the South Sea Company until his death.

Bateman stood unsuccessfully for Parliament for London at the 1710 general election. He was returned unopposed as Member of Parliament (MP) for Ilchester at a by-election on 2 June 1711, and was returned again at the 1713 general election. At the 1715 general election, he was defeated in a contest at Ilchester but was returned as MP for East Looe. He was elected Lord Mayor of London for 1716 to 1717.

== Death and legacy ==
Bateman died in 1718. He had four sons and three daughters. His estates in Herefordshire, Kent and Essex were divided between his sons. His son William was created Viscount Bateman and inherited Shobdon Court.

== See also ==
- Chief Cashier of the Bank of England

Government offices
Preceded by Abraham Houblon	Governor of the Bank of England; 1705–1707	Succeeded by Francis Eyles
Parliament of Great Britain
Preceded by Edward Phelips; Samuel Masham	Member of Parliament for Ilchester; 1711–1715; With: Edward Phelips	Succeeded by William Bellamy; John Hopkins
Preceded by Sir Charles Hedges; Edward Jennings	Member of Parliament for East Looe; 1715–1718; With: John Smith	Succeeded by John Smith; Horatio Walpole
Civic offices
Preceded by Sir Charles Peers	Lord Mayor of London; 1716–1717	Succeeded by Sir William Lewen
