= Duquesne, Arizona =

Ghost town in Santa Cruz County, Arizona

- Ghost town
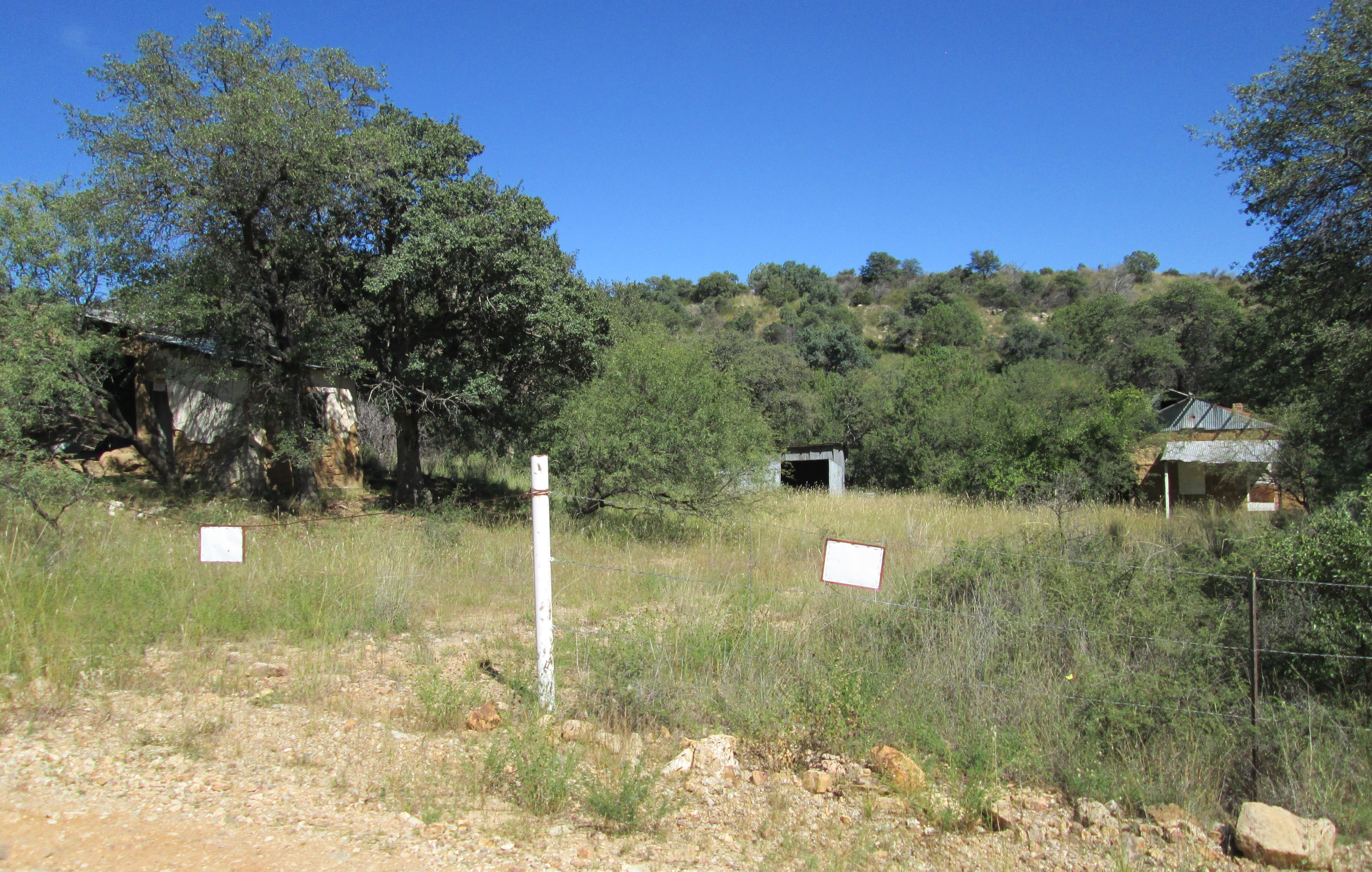
- Adobe ruins in Duquesne.

- Location within Arizona Location within the United States
- Coordinates: 31°22′16″N 110°41′09″W
- Country: United States
- State: Arizona
- County: Santa Cruz
- Established: 1890
- Time zone: Mountain (MST)
- Post Office opened: June 6, 1890
- Post Office closed: February 14, 1920

Duquesne is a ghost town in the Patagonia Mountains in eastern Santa Cruz County, Arizona, near the international border with Sonora, Mexico. The town, which is currently under private ownership and closed to the public although the roads are almost all public, was once the headquarters of the Duquesne Mining and Reduction Company and is the site of the Bonanza Mine. Washington Camp is approximately one mile northwest of Duquesne and was where the mine's reduction plant was located.

== History ==
American prospectors in the Patagonia Mountains had established claims in Washington Gulch as early as the 1860s, but recurrent Apache raids prevented the area from being fully developed until the 1890s. Washington Camp was the older of the two towns and had been the site of a post office since 1880. Duquesne was founded ten years later in 1890, a year after George Westinghouse of the Westinghouse Electric Company bought up a majority of the Patagonia claims and organized the Duquesne Mining & Reduction Company to begin large-scale production. On June 6, 1890, the post office in Washington Camp was closed and moved to Duquesne, which was also the location of the company headquarters and the Bonanza Mine. Major production began in 1912 and lasted until 1918, with total production at more than 450,000 tons of zinc, lead and copper ore and silver as a byproduct.

During its heyday, Duquesne boasted 1,000 residents, several businesses and numerous homes, one of which was a large Victorian frame house belonging to George Westinghouse. The home still stands, although in disrepair. Other remains include a smaller frame house, a boarding house and brothel, an adobe commercial building and an old cemetery. The schoolhouse was located in between Duquesne and Washington Camp, to serve the students of each community, but has since been demolished. The site is now occupied by a modern A-frame cabin. There is also the ruins of various mining operations in the surrounding hills.

A few residences remain in Duquesne and Washington Camp, although the post office has been closed since 1920. Signs are posted against trespassers. There are other ghost towns in the area as well, including Harshaw and Mowry to the north and Lochiel just to the southeast, along the border with Mexico.

== Gallery ==
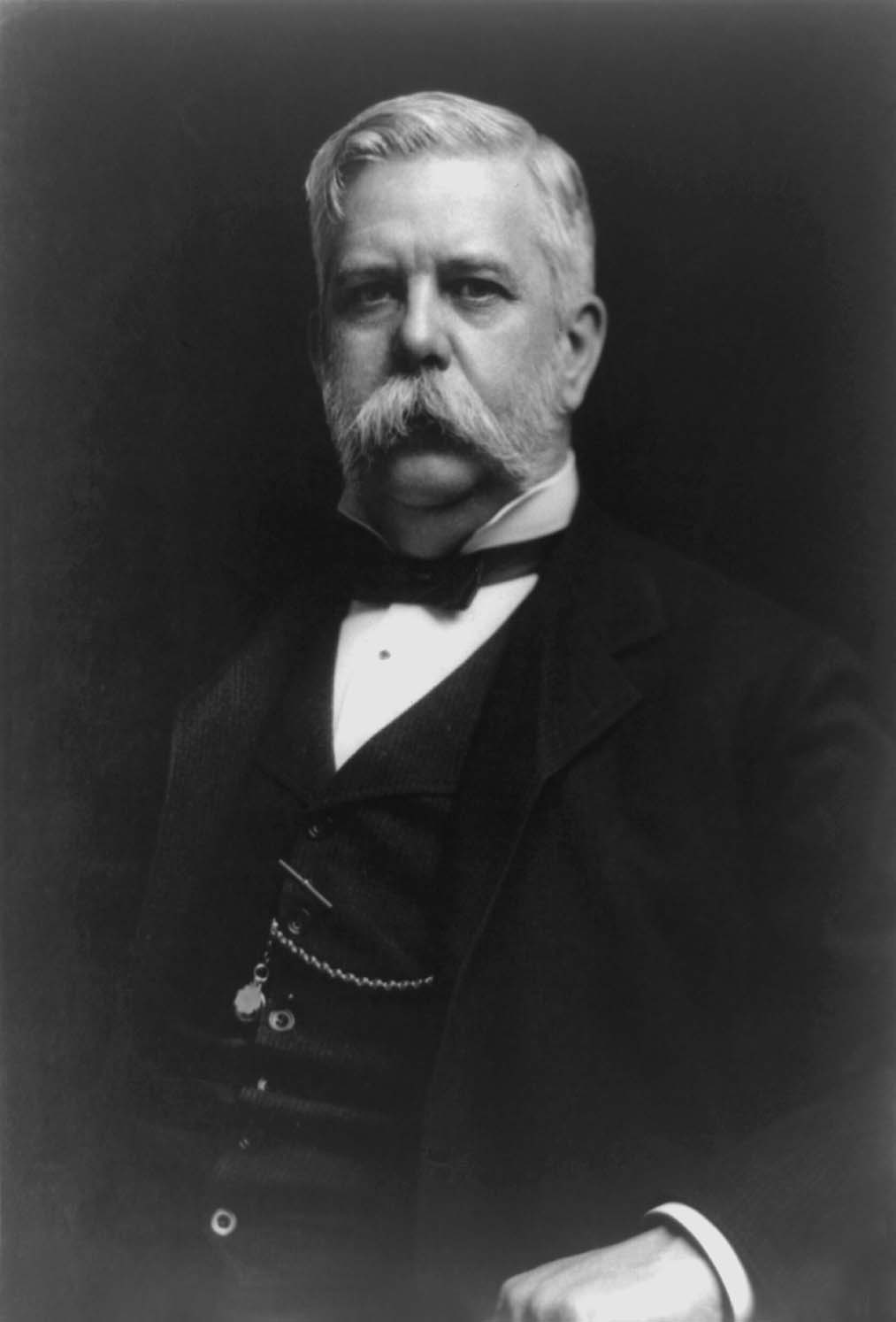
George Westinghouse (1846–1914)

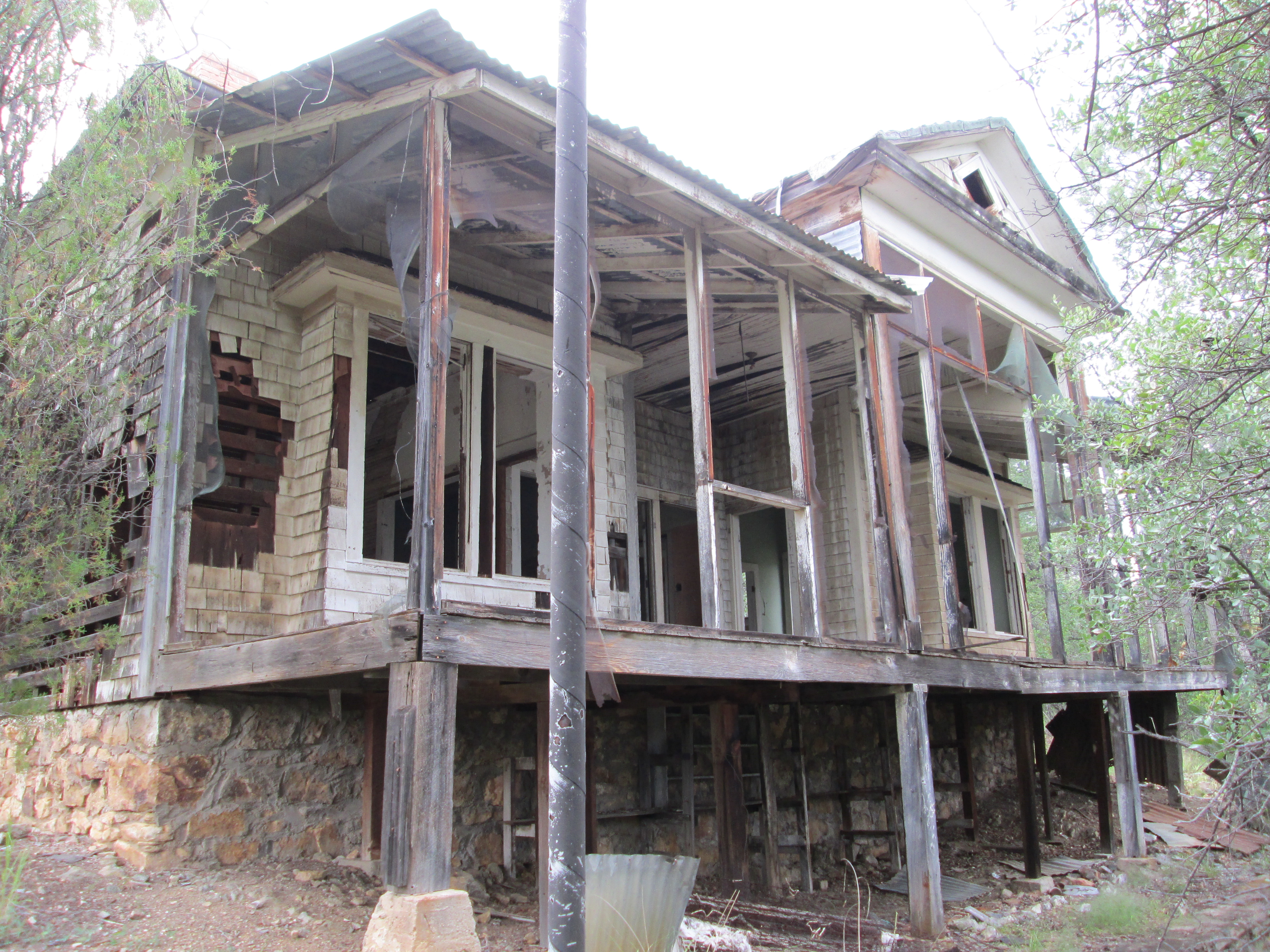
The Westinghouse Estate.

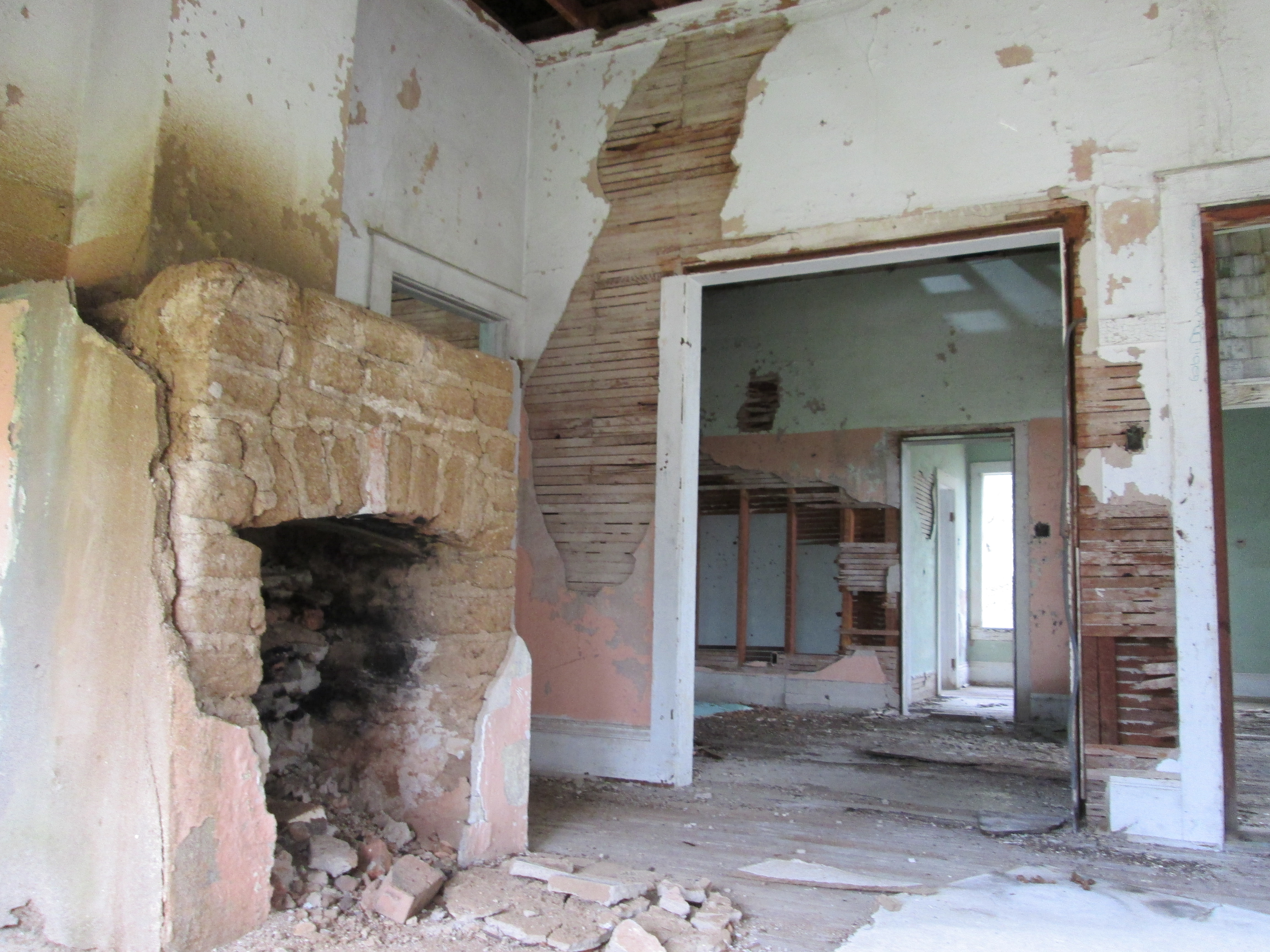
Inside the Westinghouse Estate from the kitchen window.

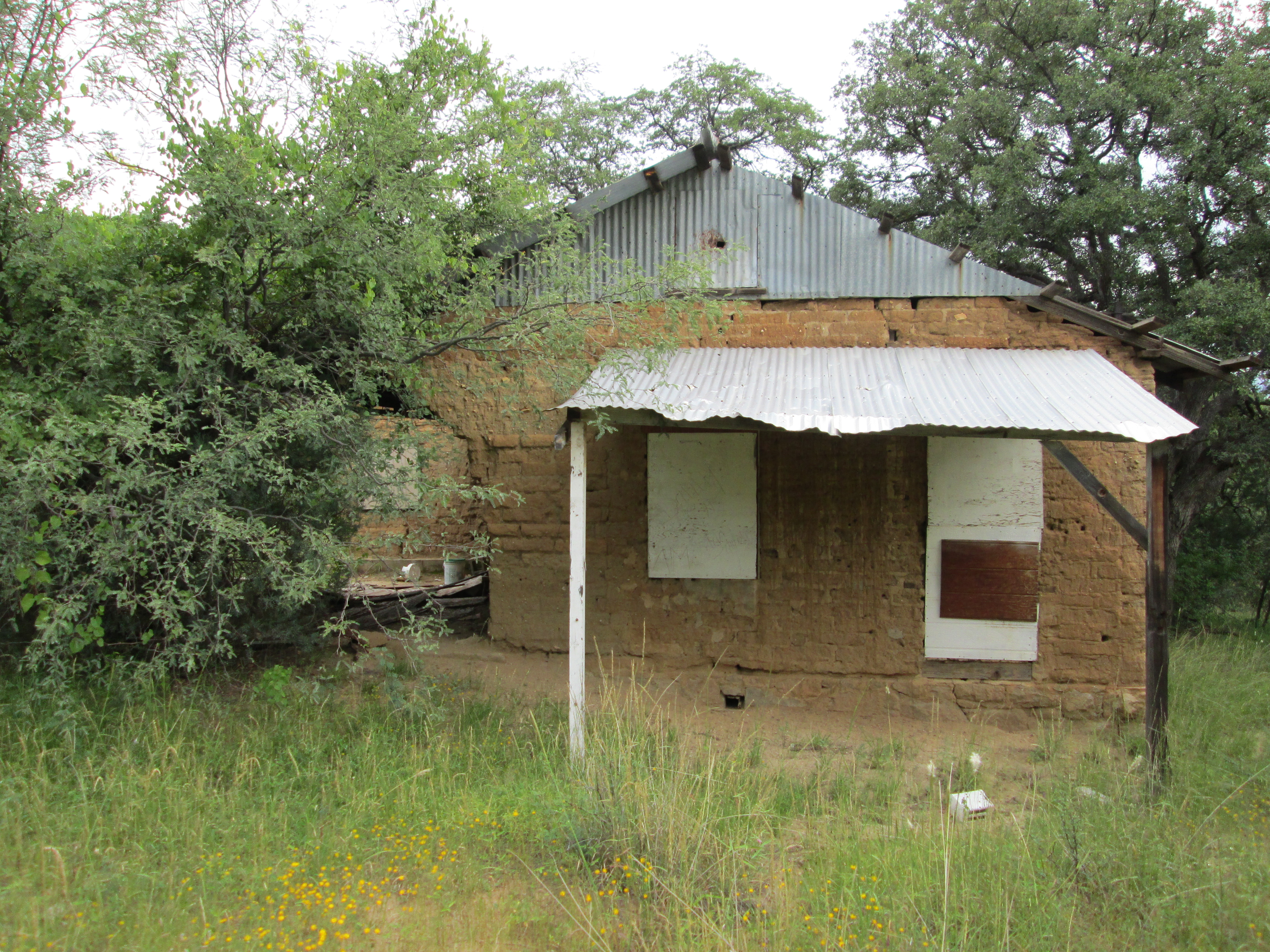
The commercial building.

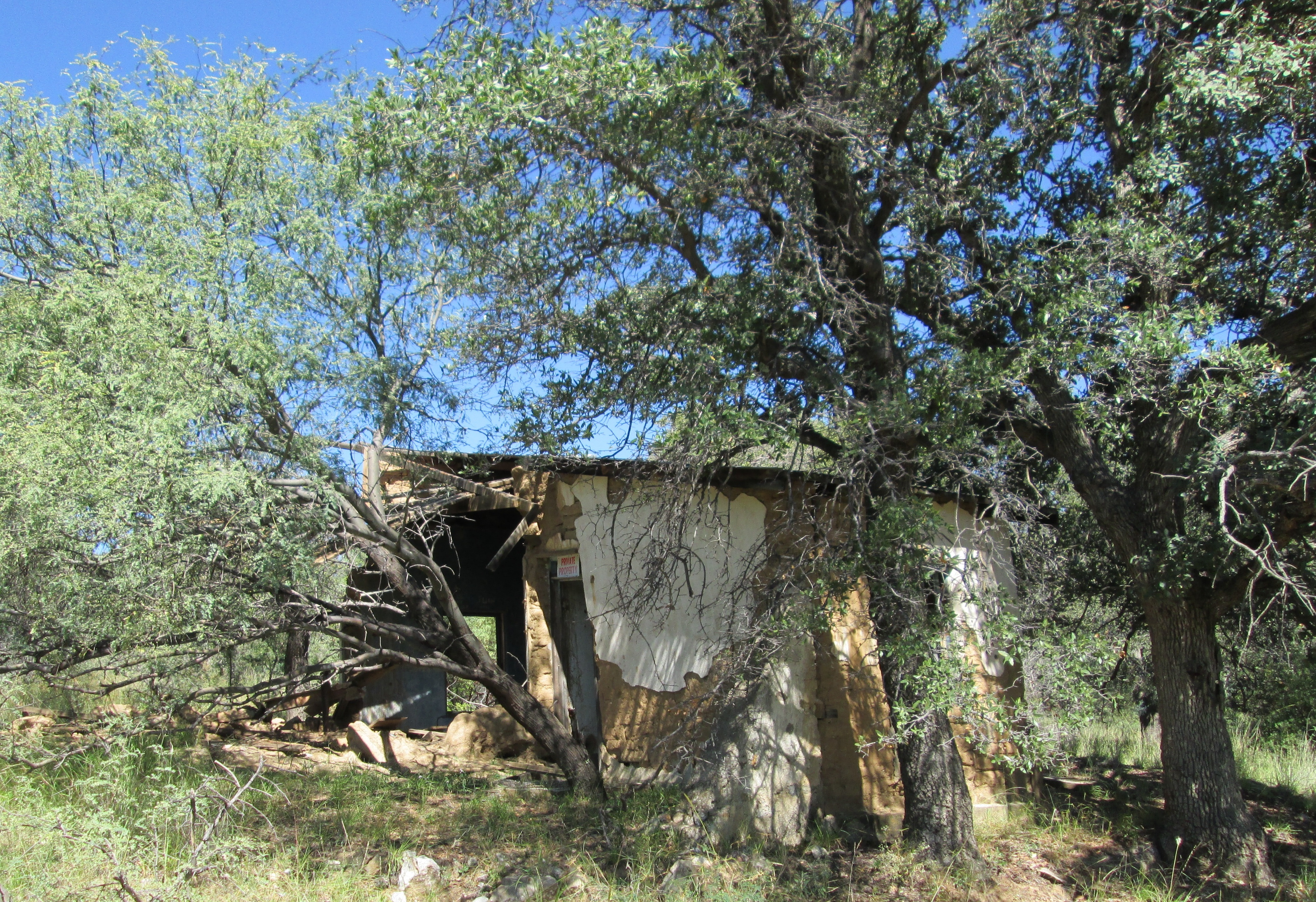
The ruins of what may have been the assay office.

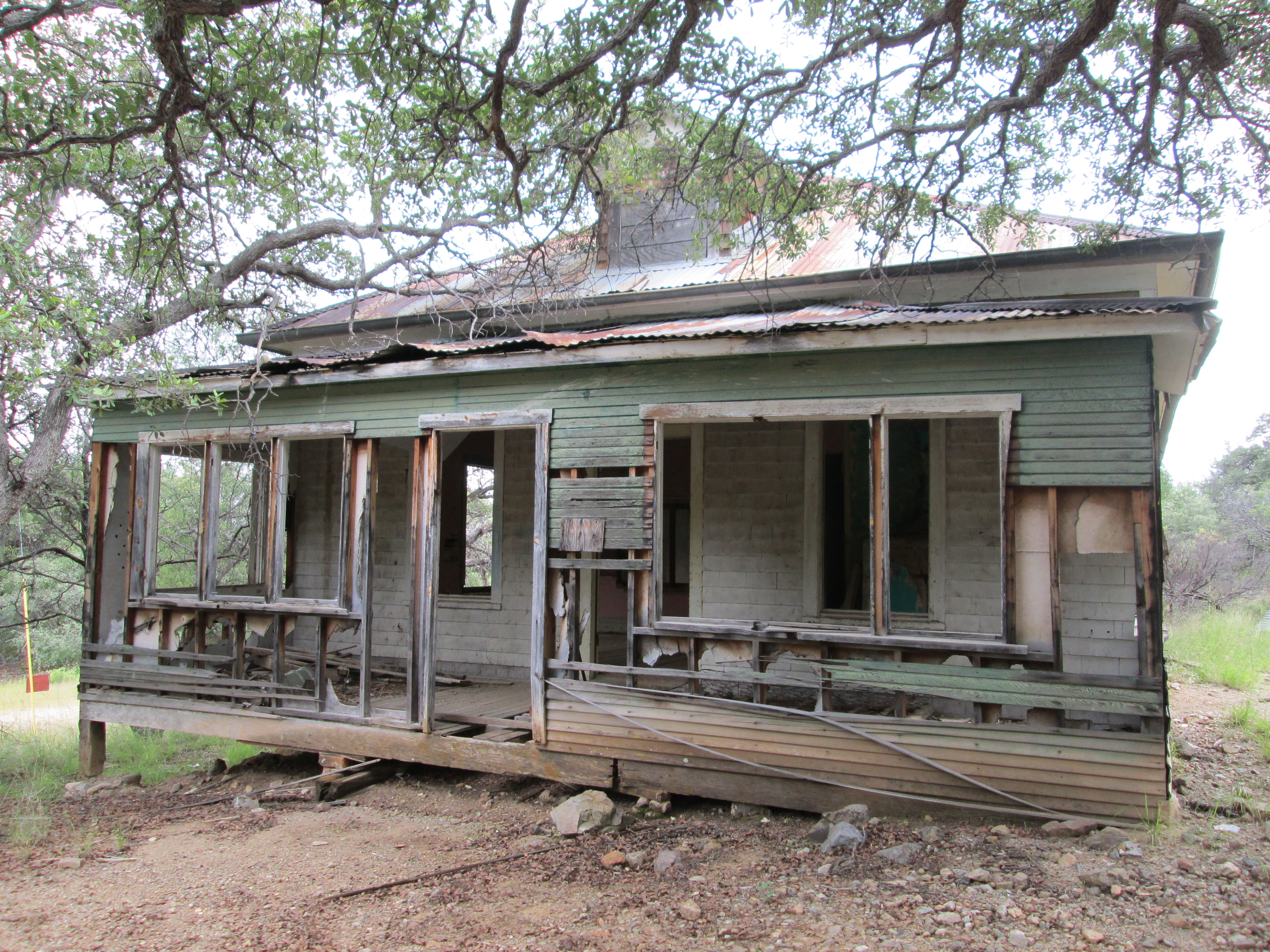
The boarding house and brothel.

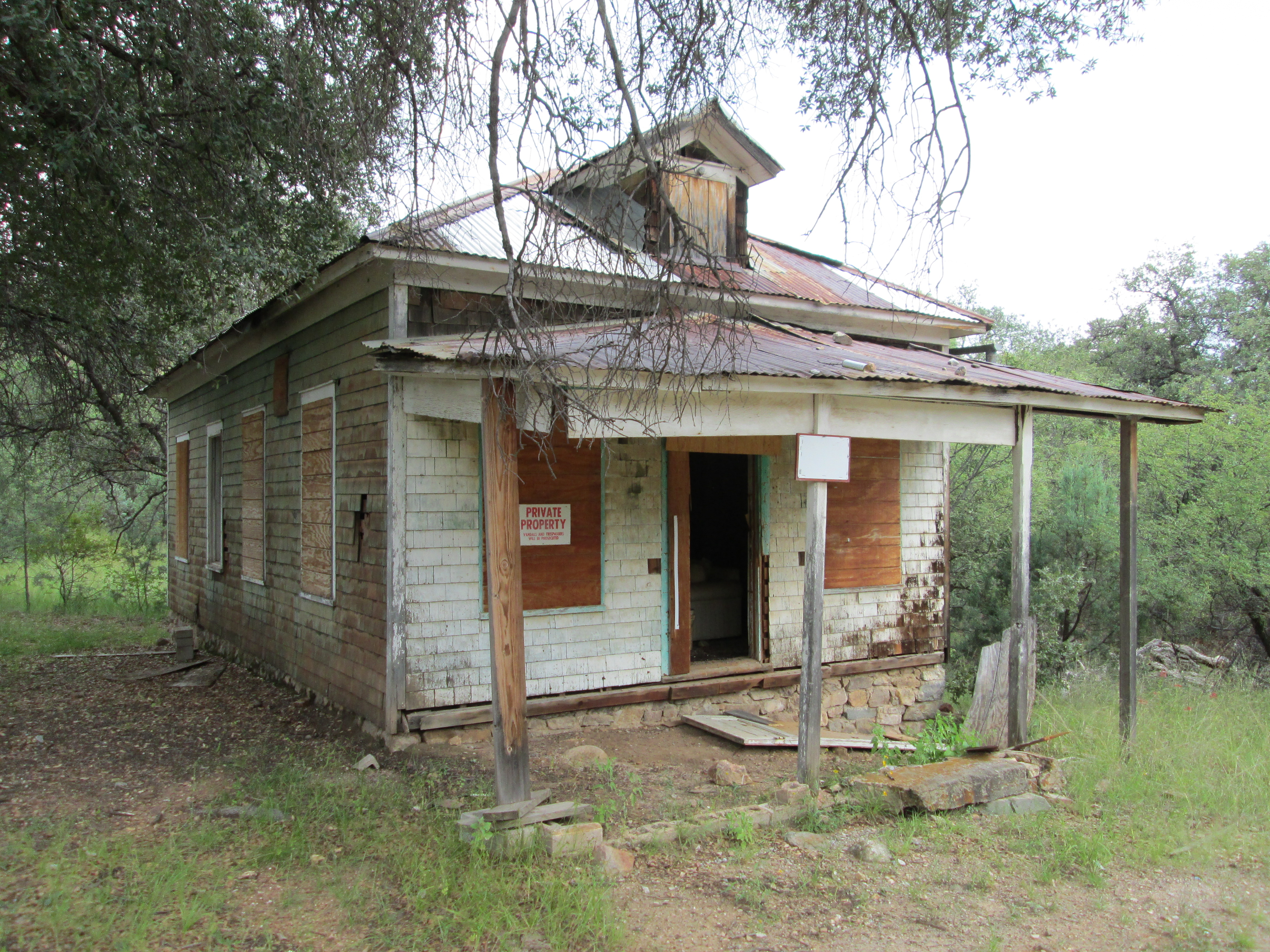
A small frame house.

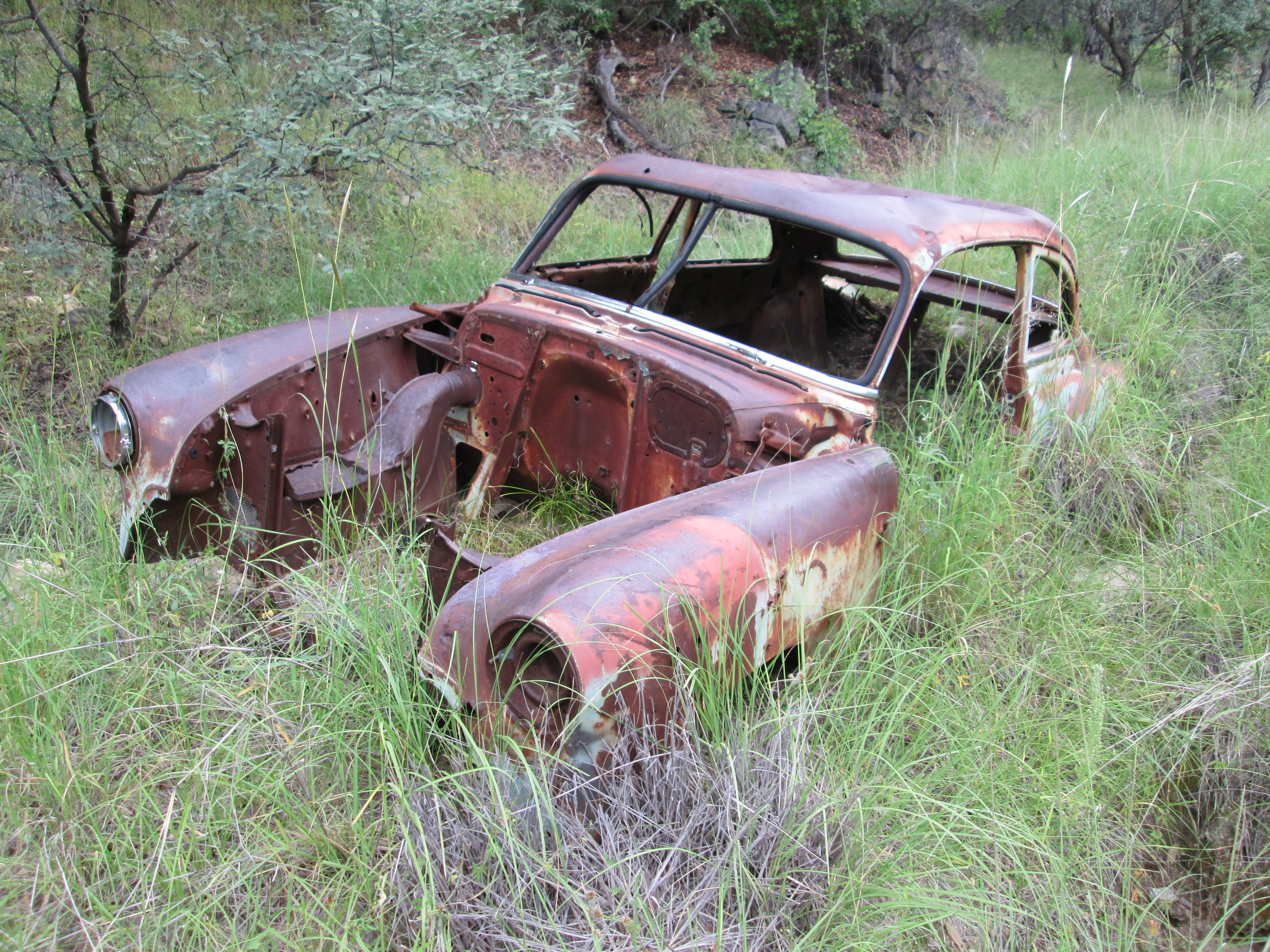
The remains of an old car near the little house.

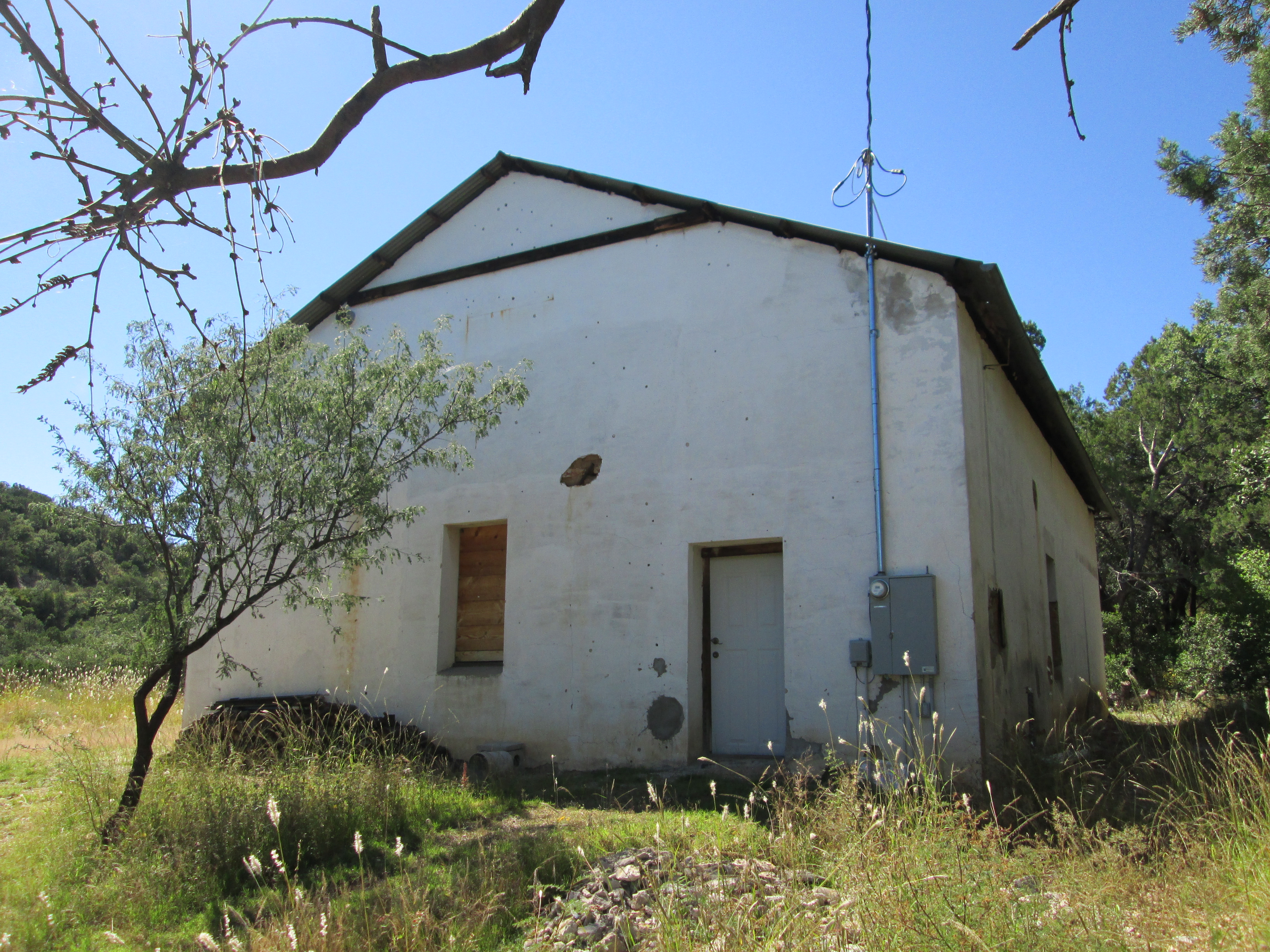
A large adobe building that was once part of the Bonanza Mine.

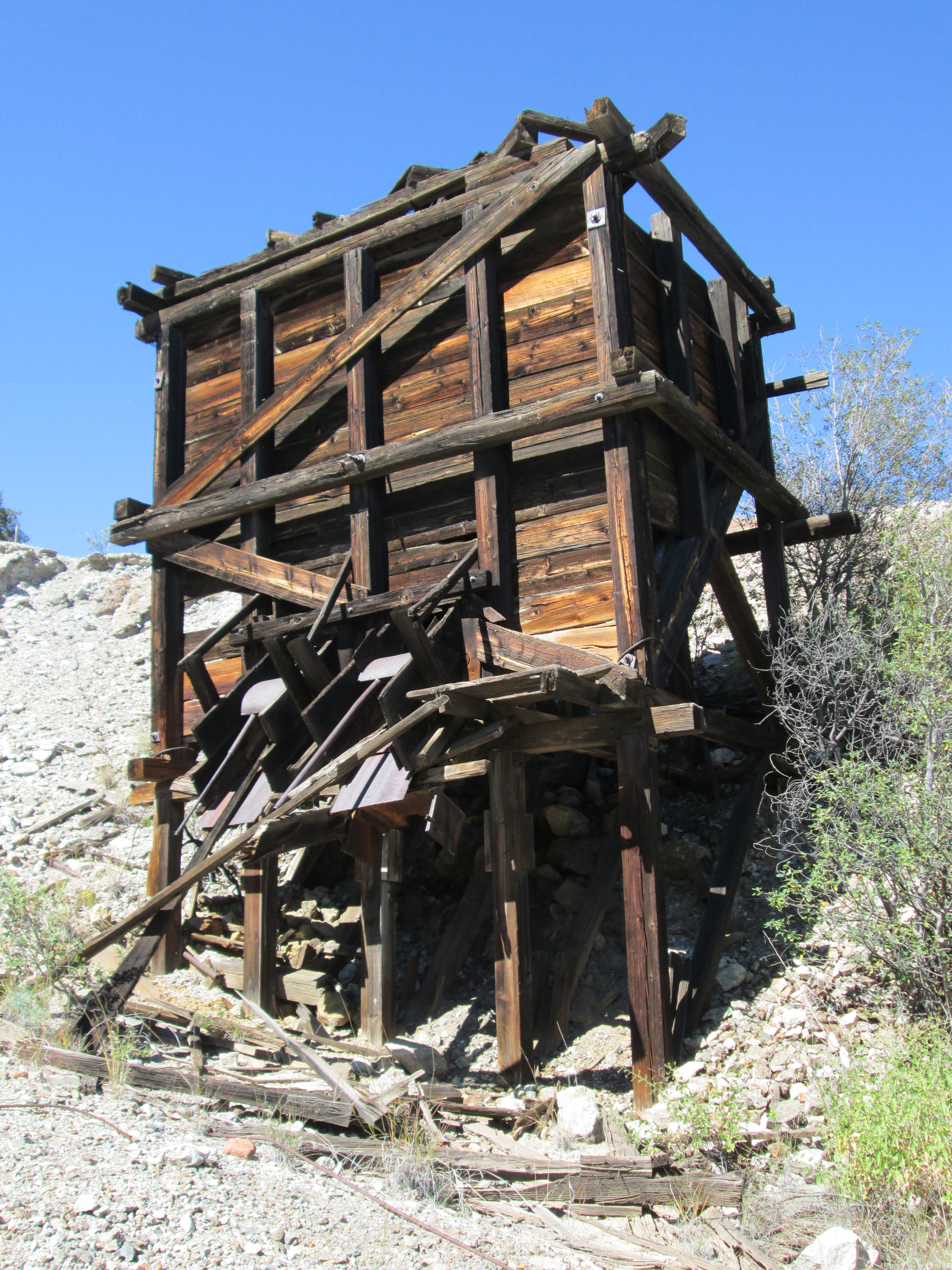
An ore chute at the Bonanza Mine.

== See also ==
- List of ghost towns in Arizona
