= Abraham Houblon =

Governors of the Bank of England (1640-1722)

- Born: 1640
- Died: 1722 (aged 81–82)
- Occupation: Deputy Governor

Abraham Houblon (23 January 1640 – 11 May 1722) was Governor of the Bank of England from 1703 to 1705. He had been Deputy Governor from 1701 to 1703. He replaced John Ward and was succeeded by James Bateman.

He was a brother of Sir James Houblon and Sir John Houblon.

Abraham was born on 23 January 1640 and baptised at the French Church, Threadneedle Street, London. He married at Westminster Abbey on 2 January 1672, Dorothy Hubert, who was a niece of Henry King, bishop of Chichester, and granddaughter of John King, bishop of London. Abraham died on 11 May 1722 at Langley. His daughter Anne married Henry Temple, later 1st Viscount Palmerston.

== See also ==
- Chief Cashier of the Bank of England

Government offices
Preceded by Sir John Ward	Governor of the Bank of England; 1703 – 1705	Succeeded by Sir James Bateman
