= Washington Camp, Arizona =

- Populated place
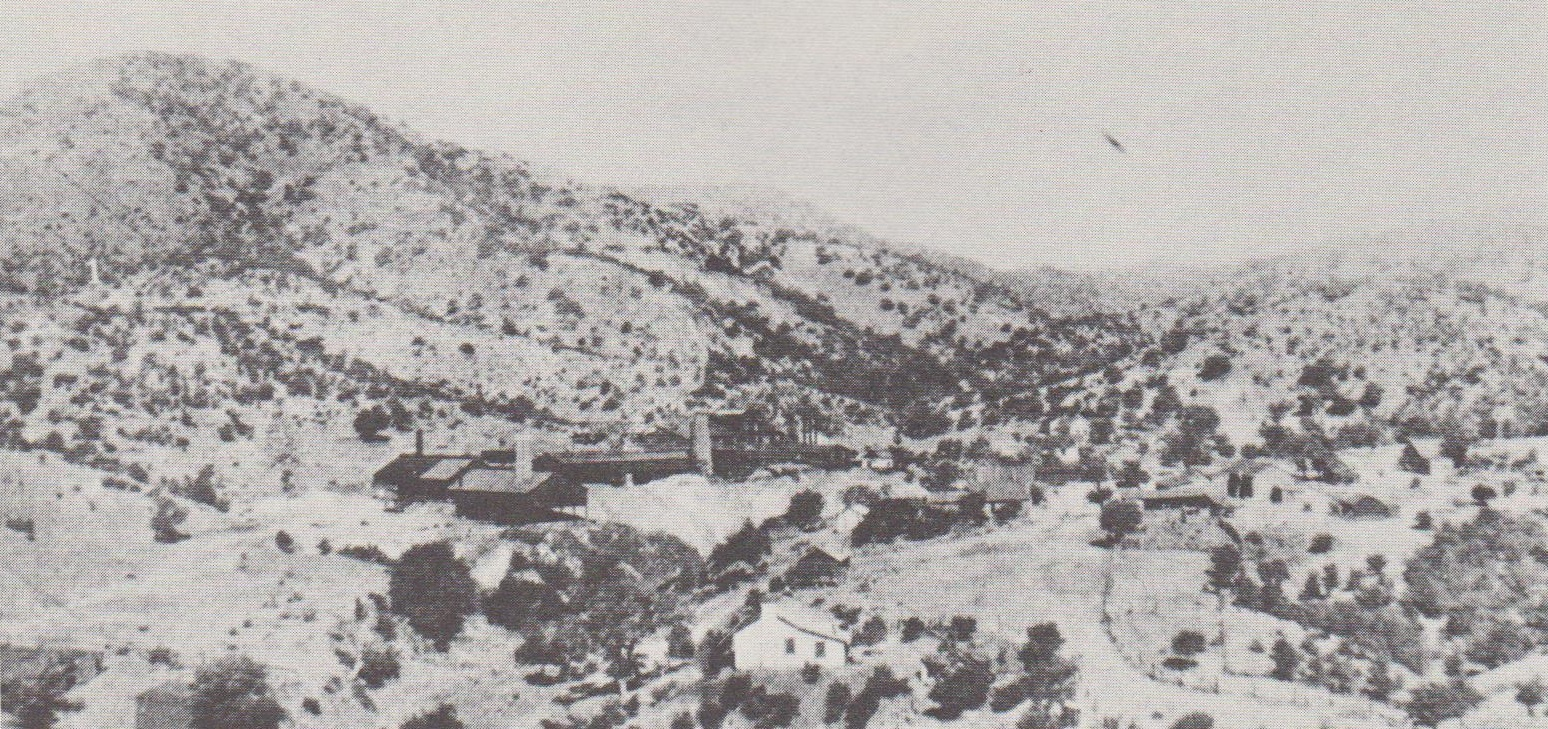
- Washington Camp, facing west in 1909. The large mine buildings is the Duquesne Reduction Plant.

- Location within Arizona Location within the United States
- Coordinates: 31°22′56.83″N 110°40′31.18″W
- Country: United States
- State: Arizona
- County: Santa Cruz
- Established: 1880
- Time zone: Mountain (MST)
- Post Office opened: May 13, 1880
- Post Office closed: June 6, 1890

Washington Camp is a populated place in Santa Cruz County, Arizona, United States. Little remains of the historic mining camp and what does is on private property belonging to the community's few remaining residents. The Mad Miner Inn has lodging, checkout availability and location on maps. The ruins of the ghost town of Duquesne are one mile southeast of Washington Camp. The post office in Washington Camp was first opened on May 13, 1880, and moved to nearby Duquesne on June 6, 1890.

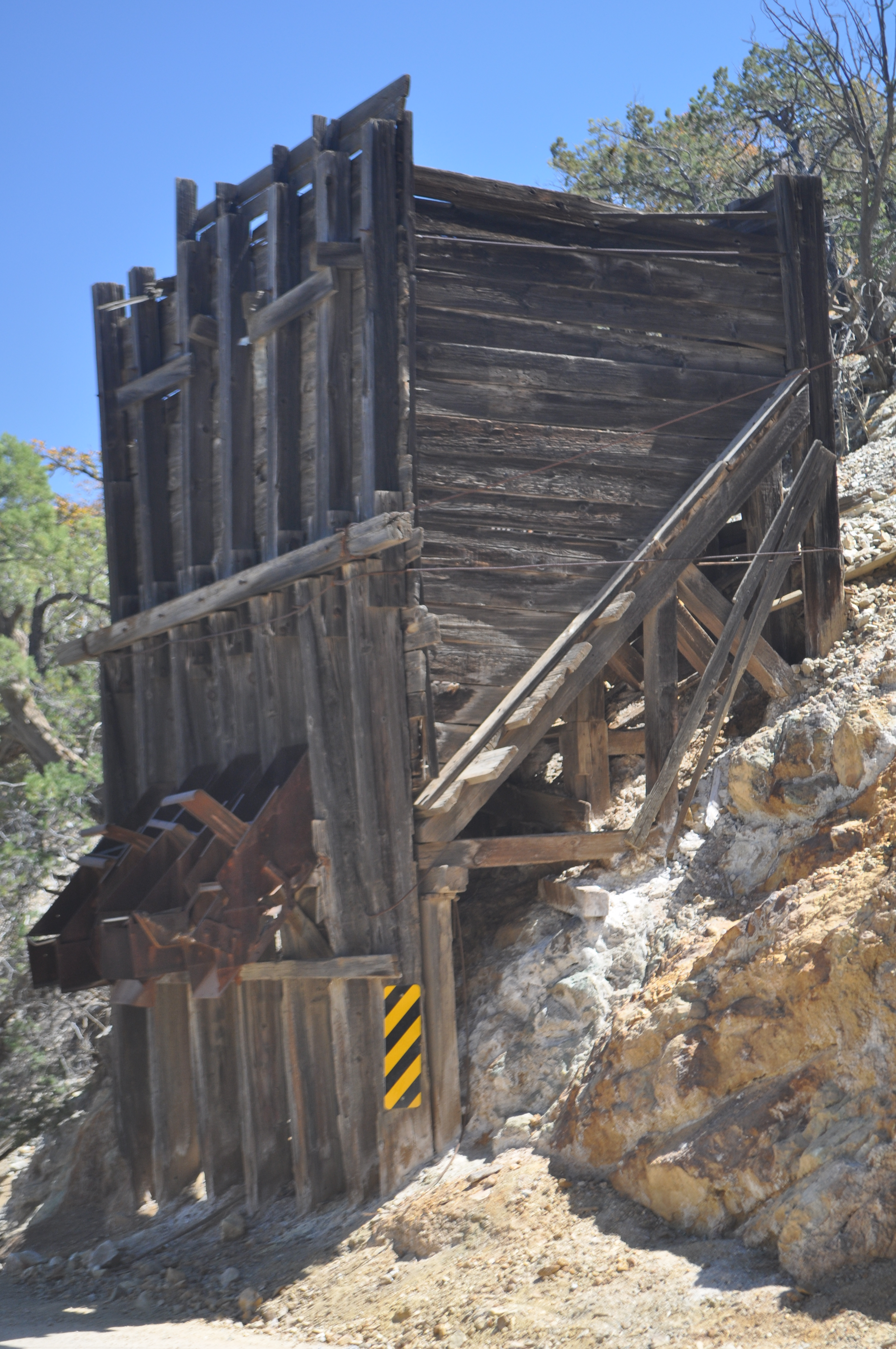
Mine workings (possibly the Kansas Mine) approximately a mile northwest of Washington Camp along the road to Rio Rico

== See also ==
- List of ghost towns in Arizona
