= Peter Du Cane, the elder =

Peter Du Cane (alias Du Quesne) (17 March 1645 – 16 September 1714), a descendant of Jean Du Quesne, the elder and son of Pierre du Quesne and Jeanne Maurois, was a third generation English-born descendant in a family of prominent and noble Huguenot refugees who escaped from Flanders and originally settled in Canterbury in the reign of Elizabeth I, following the persecutions carried on in the low countries under the Duke of Alba. The second generation of the family settled in London and acquired citizenship (see Jean Du Quesne, the younger). Peter Du Cane became an Alderman of the City of London (1666) and an elder of the French Protestant Church in Threadneedle Street.

On 6 January 1675 Du Cane married Jane Booth, daughter of Richard Booth, grocer and Alderman of London. Their son and only child, Richard Du Cane M.P., was a leading British politician and businessmen of the latter 17th century, playing a founding role, together with the Houblon family, in the founding of the Bank of England and the East India Company.
