= James Houblon =

English businessman (1629–1700)

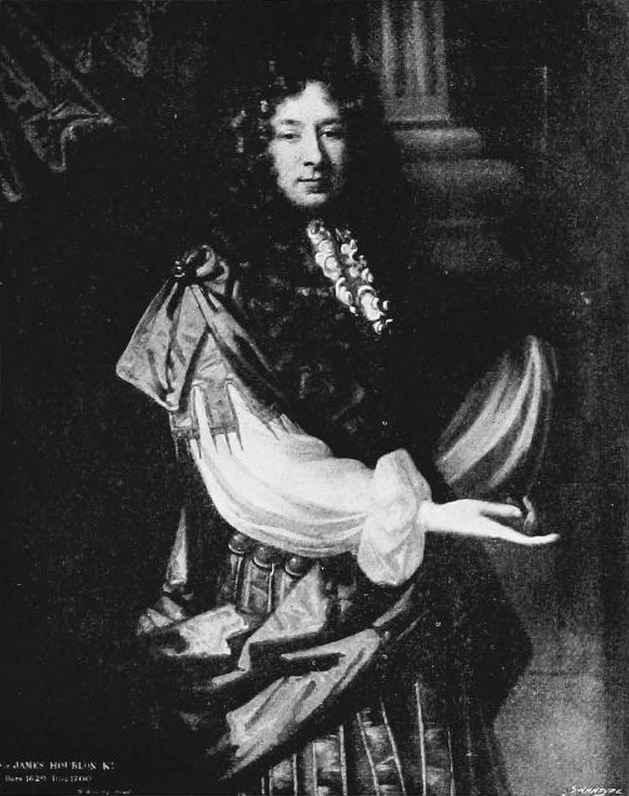
Sir James Houblon: a portrait attributed to Willem Wissing.

Sir James Houblon (1629 – circa 26 October 1700) was an influential merchant and Member of Parliament for the City of London.

James was baptised at St Mary Woolchurch Haw Church in London on 26 July 1629, the second son of James Houblon, a prosperous merchant and Mary, the daughter of Jean du Quesne, the Younger of London and Canterbury. Both parents were descended from French Huguenot immigrants.

He invested heavily in the East India and Iberian trades, specialising in the import of Port wine. He held appointments in the East India Company and the Levant Company. With his younger brother John, he was instrumental in establishing the Bank of England and was a director from the founding of the bank in 1692. He was elected an Alderman of the City of London in 1692, and was knighted shortly afterwards. He was elected as the Member of Parliament for the City in July 1698. James was a friend of Samuel Pepys, and through him, John Evelyn.
