= Jean du Quesne, the Younger =

Flanders noble (1575–1612)

Jean du Quesne, the younger (1575–1612) was the son of Jean Du Quesne, the elder, a particularly well-documented Huguenot refugee from Flanders.

Of noble extraction, Jean Du Quesne the elder escaped to England during the reign of Queen Elizabeth I following the Low Country persecutions of Protestants under the Duke of Alba, originally settling in Canterbury where he served as an elder of the French Church.

Jean Du Quesne the younger was the first English-born member of what later was known as the "Du Cane" family, which ultimately became a leading London family of trade, insurance and finance that was closely connected to the Bank of England and the East India Company. Born in London, Du Quesne was made a citizen in 1600. On 22 January 1599 Du Quesne married Sarah de Francqueville, daughter of Jean de Francqueville and Anne Le Maire and had 9 children, one of whom, Peter (a.k.a. Pierre) (born 1609), first anglicized the family name to "Du Cane" and another, Marie, who married James Houblon, of another prominent Huguenot family that had escaped from Flanders to England. One of their sons, John Houblon (1632–1712), was the first Governor of the Bank of England.
