= John Houblon =

English merchant, banker and politician (1632–1712

The Right Honourable Sir John Houblon
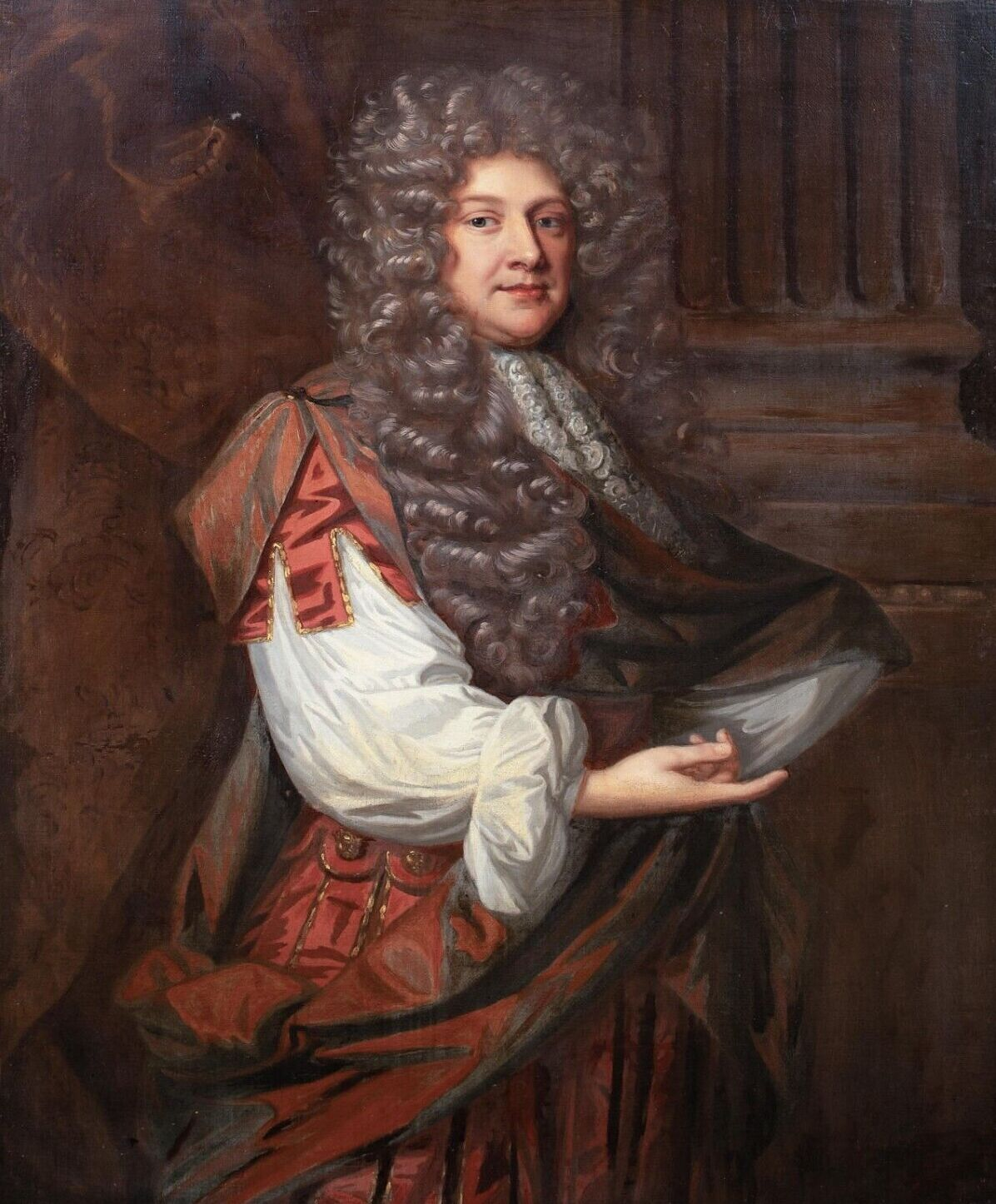
- Portrait attributed to Sir Godfrey Kneller

Governor of the Bank of England
- In office 1694–1697
- Preceded by: Office established
- Succeeded by: William Scawen

Lord Mayor of London
- In office 1695–1696
- Preceded by: Thomas Lane
- Succeeded by: Edward Clarke

Personal details
- Born: 13 March 1632
- Died: 10 January 1712 (aged 79)
- Spouse: Mary Jurin (after 1660)
- Children: 11
- Relatives: Abraham Houblon (brother); James Houblon (brother)

Sir John Houblon (13 March 1632 – 10 January 1712) was an English merchant, banker and politician who served as the first governor of the Bank of England from 1694 to 1697. He also served as the Lord Mayor of London in 1695.

== Early life ==
John Houblon was the third son of James Houblon, a London merchant, and his wife, Mary Du Quesne, daughter of Jean Du Quesne, the younger. He had nine brothers and three sisters. The Houblon family were Huguenots from Lille and he later became an elder in the French Protestant Church of London in Threadneedle Street.

His younger brother, Abraham Houblon, was also Bank of England Governor, from 1703 to 1705. A daughter of Abraham Houblon, Anne, was married to Henry Temple, later Viscount Palmerston, in 1703. His older brother, James, an influential merchant and Member of Parliament for the City of London, was also a director of the Bank of England. Four other of his brothers were prosperous merchants.

== Career ==
He became Sheriff of the City of London in 1689, an Alderman from 1689 to 1712, and Master of the Grocer's Company from 1690 to 1691. He was Lord Mayor in 1695.

He was a Lord Commissioner of the Admiralty from 1694 to 1699. It was during this time, from 1694 until 1697, that he served as inaugural governor of the Bank of England. He was again a Bank of England director from 1700, and a director of the New East India Company from 1700 to 1701.

He stood as a Parliamentary candidate for the City of London in 1701, but was defeated. Some sources state incorrectly that he was Member of Parliament for Bodmin.

=== Appearance on banknotes ===
Houblon has been commemorated by his appearance on the reverse of Series E £50 notes issued by the Bank of England. The notes were issued in 1994, the year of the Bank's 300th anniversary. The design includes an image of Houblon's house in Threadneedle Street, the site of the present Bank of England building. A new £50 note was brought into circulation in 2011, featuring James Watt and Matthew Boulton in place of Sir John Houblon. The Houblon note ceased to be legal tender on 30 April 2014.

== Personal life ==
He married Mary Jurin in 1660, who came from a Flemish Protestant family and they had five sons and six daughters, but only two sons survived their father. They lived in a magnificent house just off Threadneedle Street on the site later occupied by the Bank of England and he also acquired a country house at High Ongar in Essex.

Government offices
First	Governor of the Bank of England; 1694 - 1697	Succeeded by Sir William Scawen
Civic offices
Preceded by Sir Thomas Lane	Lord Mayor of London; 1695 – 1696	Succeeded by Sir Edward Clarke
