= 2024 Birthday Honours =

Appointments made by King Charles III

The 2024 King's Birthday Honours are appointments by some of the 15 Commonwealth realms of King Charles III to various orders and honours to reward and highlight good works by citizens of those countries. The Birthday Honours are awarded as part of the King's Official Birthday celebrations during the month of June.

The King appoints members to the orders upon the advice of his ministers. However, the Order of the Garter, the Order of the Thistle, the Order of Merit and the Royal Victorian Order are bestowed solely by the Sovereign.

== United Kingdom ==
Below are the individuals appointed by Charles III in his right as King of the United Kingdom with honours within his own gift, and with the advice of the Government for other honours.

=== Order of the Companions of Honour ===
Order of the Companions of Honour ribbon

==== Member of the Order of Companions of Honour (CH) ====
- The Rt Hon Dr Gordon Brown – For Public and Charitable Services in the UK and Abroad.

=== Knight Bachelor ===
Knight Bachelor ribbon

- Alan Bates – Founder, Justice for Subpostmasters Alliance. For services to Justice.
- Robert Frederick Behrens, CBE – Parliamentary and Health Service Ombudsman UK. For Public Service.
- Wayne David – lately Member of Parliament for Caerphilly and Shadow Minister for the Middle East and North Africa. For Parliamentary and Political Service.
- Richard Douglas, CB – chair, NHS South East London Integrated Care Board. For services to the NHS.
- Niall Ferguson – Historian and Author. For services to Literature.
- Richard Cecil Greenhalgh – chair, United Learning Multi-Academy Trust. For services to Education.
- Professor Tony Kouzarides, FMedSci, FRS – Professor of Cancer Biology, University of Cambridge. For services to Healthcare Innovation and Delivery.
- Nicholas Lyons, DL – lately Lord Mayor of London. For services to the Financial Sector, to the Growth Economy and to Financial Literacy.
- Andy Marsh, QPM – Chief Executive, College of Policing. For services to Policing.
- Professor Wayne McGregor, CBE – Choreographer. For services to Dance.
- John Rutter, CBE – Composer. For services to Music.
- Professor James Skea, CBE, FRSE – Emeritus Professor, Centre for Environmental Policy, Imperial College, London and International Institute for Environment and Development. For services to Climate Science.
- Mark Tucker – chair, HSBC. For services to the Economy.
- Roger Wright, CBE – Chief Executive, Britten Pears Arts. For services to Music.

OVERSEAS AND INTERNATIONAL LIST

- Emeritus Professor Roderick Beaton – Writer and Historian. For services to History and to UK/Greece relations.
- M. Stanley Whittingham – Professor of Materials Science and Engineering, University of Binghamton, New York, United States of America. For services to Chemistry.

=== Most Honourable Order of the Bath ===
Order of the Bath ribbon

==== Knight/Dame Commander of the Order of the Bath (KCB / DCB) ====
Military

- Lieutenant General Charles Richard Strickland, CB, OBE – Chief of Joint Operations since 2021
- Lieutenant General Ian John Cave, CB – UK Military Representative to NATO

Civil

- Antonia Romeo – Permanent Secretary, Ministry of Justice. For Public Service
- Jim Harra, CB – Chief Executive and First Permanent Secretary, HM Revenue and Customs. For Public Service
- Peter Schofield, CB – Permanent Secretary, Department for Work and Pensions. For Public Service

==== Companion of the Order of the Bath (CB) ====
Military

- Rear Admiral Rex John Cox
- Major General John Richard Collyer
- Major General Anna-Lee Reilly
- Lieutenant General Richard Wardlaw, OBE
- Air Marshal Martin Elliott Sampson, CBE, DSO

Civil

- David Alan Evans – Director General and General Counsel, Legal Group, HM Revenue and Customs. For services to the Government Legal Profession, to Tax and to Diversity
- Elizabeth Hambley – Lately Director General Legal, Government Legal Department. For services to the Law
- Elizabeth Claire Honer – Lately Chief Executive, Government Internal Audit Agency. For Public Service
- Simon McKinnon, CBE – Lately Director General, Department for Work and Pensions. For services to Digital Technology
- Chloe Squires – Director General, Homeland Security Group, Home Office. For Public Service
- Jennifer Grace Stevens – Director, Intervention Delivery, Department for Levelling Up, Housing and Communities. For Public Service

=== Most Distinguished Order of St Michael and St George ===
Order of St Michael and St George ribbon

==== Knight/Dame Commander of the Order of St Michael and St George (KCMG / DCMG) ====
- William Felix Browder – chief executive officer, Hermitage Capital Management, and Head, Global Magnitsky Justice Campaign. For services to Human Rights, Anti-Corruption, and International Affairs.
- Alex Ellis, CMG – Lately British High Commissioner to India. For services to British Foreign Policy.
- The Lord Ahmad of Wimbledon – The Prime Minister's Special Representative for Preventing Sexual Violence in Conflict and Minister of State, Foreign, Commonwealth and Development Office. For services to British Foreign Policy, Humanitarian Affairs and the Commonwealth, Faith and Integration, Community and Families in the UK.
- Keith Palmer, OBE – chair, Trustees of Enterprise for Development and former chair, AgDevCo, InfraCo Africa and InfraCo Asia. For services to International Development.
- Dr Andrew Steer – President and chief executive officer, Bezos Earth Fund. For services to Global Sustainable Development and Climate Change.

==== Companion of the Order of St Michael and St George (CMG) ====
- Paul Chichester, MBE – National Cyber Security Centre, Director Operations. For services to Cyber Security.
- Professor Melita Gordon – Professor of Global Health, Malawi-Liverpool-Wellcome Programme, Blantyre, Malawi; and University of Liverpool, United Kingdom. For services to Global Health.
- Fiona Mcilwham – Private Secretary for Foreign Affairs, 10 Downing Street. For services to British Foreign Policy.
- Blaise Metreweli – Director General, Foreign, Commonwealth and Development Office. For services to British Foreign Policy.
- Antony Phillipson – British High Commissioner to South Africa. For services to British Foreign Policy and International Trade and Investment.

=== Royal Victorian Order ===
Royal Victorian Order ribbon

==== Knight/Dame Commander of the Royal Victorian Order (KCVO / DCVO) ====
- Isobel Jane, Duchess of Northumberland, lately Lord-Lieutenant of Northumberland.
- Rupert Charles, Baron de Mauley, TD, Master of the Horse.
- Captain Ian McNaught, CVO, lately Deputy Master, the Corporation of Trinity House.

==== Commander of the Royal Victorian Order (CVO) ====
- John David Sebastian Booth, chair, The Prince's Trust.
- Sir John Rawcliffe Airey Crabtree, OBE, Lord-Lieutenant of the West Midlands.
- Michael David Dixon, LVO, OBE, Head of the Royal Medical Household.
- His Excellency General the Honourable David John Hurley, AC, DSC, lately Governor-General of the Commonwealth of Australia.
- Alan Gordon Simpson, OBE, Lord-Lieutenant of Stirling and Falkirk.
- Julian Arthur Vaughan Smith, Private Solicitor to His Majesty The King, Farrer & Co.
- Professor Sir Hew Francis Anthony Strachan, Lord-Lieutenant of Tweeddale.

==== Lieutenant of the Royal Victorian Order (LVO) ====
- Julian Graham Birt, MVO – Senior Landing Site Officer, The King's Helicopter Flight.
- Dr Fiona Ogilvie Butler, BEM – Apothecary to His Majesty The King.
- Emily Anne Cherrington – Deputy Chief Executive, The King's Foundation.
- Michael Matthew Patrick Dooley – Physician to Her Majesty The Queen.
- Jean-Christophe Nicholas Gray, CBE – lately Private Secretary to The Prince of Wales.
- Richard Andrew Fitzalan Howard – Senior Advisor, Stonehage Fleming Investment Management. For personal services to Queen Elizabeth II.
- Catherine Beris James – Advisor, Privy Purse and Treasurer's Office, Royal Household.
- Sarah Elizabeth Lord, MVO – Head of Events, Royal Household.
- The Reverend Kenneth Ian MacKenzie – Domestic Chaplain to The King and Minister of the Parish of Braemar and Crathie.
- Alison Flora MacMillan, MVO – Assistant Marshal of the Diplomatic Corps.
- Nicholas Charles Osler – Partner, Smith & Williamson. For personal services to Queen Elizabeth II.
- Commodore Christopher Laurence Palmer, CBE, RN – lately Gentleman Usher to His Majesty The King.
- Jill Revans, MVO – Deputy Comptroller, Household of The Duke and Duchess of Gloucester.
- Major Henry Geoffrey Robertson – lately Lieutenant, The King's Body Guard of the Yeomen of the Guard.
- Rosanna Young de Sancha, MVO – Senior Paintings Conservator, Royal Collection.
- Shaun Dominic Turner, MVO – Senior Furniture Conservator, Royal Collection.

==== Member of the Royal Victorian Order (MVO) ====
- Elizabeth Frances Clark Ashby – Curator of Books and Manuscripts, Royal Library, Windsor Castle.
- Guy Paul Blanch – Senior Honours and Investitures Clerk, Central Chancery of the Orders of Knighthood.
- Nicholas Peter Day – Head of Engagement and Events, Crown Estate, Windsor.
- David Thomas Evans, RVM – Carriage Restorer/Cleaner, Royal Household.
- Hannah Rebecca Goodall – lately House Manager, Household of The Prince and Princess of Wales.
- Elizabeth Georgina Harford – Assistant to the Marshal of the Diplomatic Corps.
- William Henry Hodges – Event Security Manager, Royal Household.
- Eric James Lofty – Senior Health and Safety Advisor, Royal Household.
- Rosemary Mason – lately Nosegay Maker, Royal Maundy Services.
- Keith Robert Murphy – Inspector, Metropolitan Police Service. For services to Royalty and Specialist Protection.
- Sheila Mary O'Connor, MBE – Head of VIP Visits, Protocol Directorate, Foreign Commonwealth and Development Office.
- Stewart Orr, RVM – Security Team Leader, Palace of Holyroodhouse.
- Kajal Patel – lately Management Accountant, Royal Household.
- Susan Wilding – Lieutenancy Officer, Lancashire.

=== Royal Victorian Medal (RVM) ===
Royal Victorian Medal ribbon

Gold

- Alan William Goodship, MVO, RVM. Lately Kennel Man, Sandringham Estate.

Silver (Bar)

- Veronica Victoria Cain, RVM. Dresser to The Princess Royal.
- Kenneth Richard Pritchard Jones, RVM. Head Groundsman, Crown Estate, Windsor.

Silver

- Robin John Brooker-Gillespie. Yeoman, The King's Body Guard of the Yeomen of the Guard.
- Jennifer Crossley. Retail and Admissions Assistant, Palace of Holyroodhouse.
- Nicholas James King. Palace Attendant, Royal Household.
- Kevin John Liddle. lately Office Assistant, Royal Household.
- Leslie Arthur Nash. lately Plumber, Sandringham Estate.
- William David Norton. Yeoman, The King's Body Guard of the Yeomen of the Guard.
- Marion O'Brien. Housekeeper, Rideau Hall, Ottawa, Canada.
- Peter George Oliver. Yeoman, The King's Body Guard of the Yeomen of the Guard.
- Michelle Robinson. Constable, Metropolitan Police Service. For services to Royalty and Specialist Protection.
- Maureen Willis. lately Daily Cleaner, Windsor Castle.
- Peter David Wilson. For services to Royalty and Specialist Protection.

=== Most Excellent Order of the British Empire ===
Civil division ribbon

Military division ribbon

==== Knight/Dame Grand Cross of the Order of the British Empire (GBE) ====
Civil

- Dame Jenny Abramsky, DBE – Media Producer and Philanthropist. For services to Arts, to Media and to Culture
- The Rt Hon Terence Etherton, Baron Etherton, KC, PC – chair, LGBT Veterans Independent Review. For services to LGBT Veterans

==== Knight/Dame Commander of the Order of the British Empire (KBE / DBE) ====
Civil

- Karen Buck – Lately Member of Parliament for Westminster North. For Parliamentary and Political Service
- Tracey Emin, CBE – Artist. For services to Art
- Ffion Hague, Lady Hague of Richmond – For Public Service and services to Business
- Rebecca Harris – Lately Comptroller and Member of Parliament for Castle Point. For Political and Public Service
- Anya Hindmarch, CBE – Designer. For services to Fashion and to Business
- Julia Anne Hoggett – chief executive officer, London Stock Exchange. For services to Business and to Finance
- Professor Karen Holford, CBE, FREng – Chief Executive and Vice Chancellor, Cranfield University. For services to Engineering
- Clare Kelly Marchant – Lately Chief Executive, Universities and Colleges Admissions Service. For services to Higher Education
- Dervilla Mitchell, CBE – Lately Deputy Chair, Arup Group. For services to Engineering
- Professor Judith Petts, CBE – Vice-Chancellor, University of Plymouth. For services to Higher Education and to Sustainability
- Hannah Rothschild, CBE – For services to Philanthropy in the Arts, Culture and Charity Sectors
- Jasvinder Sanghera, CBE – Founder, Karma Nirvana and Human Rights Campaigner. For services to the Victims of Child, Forced Marriage and Honour-Based Abuse
- Professor Janice Debra Sigsworth, CBE – Chief Nurse, Imperial College Healthcare NHS Trust. For services to Nursing
- Imelda Staunton, CBE – Actress. For services to Drama and to Charity
- Dr Helen Mary Stephenson, CBE – chief executive officer, Charity Commission for England and Wales. For services to Charity and to Regulation
- Evelyn May Taylor, OBE – Founder, Eve Taylor (London) Ltd. For services to Business
- Professor Moira Whyte, OBE – Sir John Crofton Professor of Respiratory Medicine, University of Edinburgh. For services to Medical Research
- Professor Alison Wolf, Baroness Wolf of Dulwich CBE – Sir Roy Griffiths Professor of Public Sector Management, King's College London, London. For services to Education

==== Commander of the Order of the British Empire (CBE) ====
Military

- Rear Admiral Paul Beattie
- Commodore David Andrew Joyce
- Commodore David Christopher Moody
- Major General Philip Mark Totten, OBE

Civil

- Dawn Airey, chair, National Youth Theatre. For services to Theatre and to Charity
- Monica Ali, Writer. For services to Literature
- Robert Ernest Bailey, OBE. For services to the Economy and to Opera in Northern Ireland
- Suzanne Elizabeth, Lady Heywood of Whitehall, Chief Operating Officer, Exor, chair, CNH and chair, Iveco. For services to Business Leadership
- Andrew Alleyne Berry, Principal and chief executive officer, Bridgwater and Taunton College, Somerset. For services to Further Education
- Chris Boardman, MBE, Commissioner, Active Travel England. For services to Active Travel
- Elizabeth Bramall, Philanthropist and co-founder, The Liz and Terry Bramall Foundation. For services to Charity
- John David Burns, Lately Chief Executive Officer and chair, Derwent London plc. For services to Property, to Investment and to Development
- Nica Burns, OBE, Theatre Producer and Theatre Owner. For services to Theatre
- Charles Byrne, Lately Director General, The Royal British Legion. For services to Veterans
- Graham Chipchase, chief executive officer, Brambles. For services to Sustainable Business
- Professor Peter Clarkson, FREng, Director, Cambridge Engineering Design Centre and co-director, Cambridge Public Health, University of Cambridge. For services to Engineering and Design
- Sarah Ann Connolly, Lately Director, Security and Online Harms, Department for Science, Innovation and Technology. For services to Online Safety
- Kirstine Ann Cooper, Lately General Counsel and Company Secretary, Aviva. For services to Business and to the Dormant Assets Scheme
- Dr Juliette Jo Cox, Lately Chief Regulator, Ofqual. For services to Education
- Jennifer Daly, Chief Executive, Taylor Wimpey. For services to Business and to the Housing Sector
- Mark Dowie, Chief Executive, Royal National Lifeboat Institution. For services to Maritime Safety
- Asisat Arinola Edeh, Principal and Head of Service, Westminster Adult Education Service. For services to Adult Education
- Claire Enders, Founder, Enders Analysis. For services to Media
- Judith Finlay, Lately Executive Director, Adults, Children and Public Health Services, Ealing Council. For services to Children and Families
- Professor Peter Fonagy, OBE, Head of the Division of Psychology and Language Sciences, University College London. For services to Mental Health Care for Children and Young People
- Robert Crawford Banks Forman, MBE, Lately Chairman, Scottish Conservative and Unionist Party. For Political Service
- Richard Quentin Fuller, Lately Member of Parliament for North East Bedfordshire. For Political and Public Service
- Norman Cecil Fulton, Deputy Secretary, Department of Agriculture, Environment and Rural Affairs, Northern Ireland Civil Service. For services to Agriculture in Northern Ireland
- Ian Gatt, Chief Executive, Scottish Pelagic Fishermen's Association. For services to the Fishing Industry
- Alison Jane Gowman, Alderman Canon, City of London. For Public and Voluntary Services and Sustainability
- Professor Peter Moir Guthrie, OBE, FREng, Vice President and Trustee, Royal Academy of Engineering. For services to Engineering
- Adam Hadley, Founder and Director, Tech Against Terrorism. For services to Tackling Terrorist Content Online
- Professor Freddie Charles Hamdy, FMedSci, Nuffield Professor of Surgery and Head, Nuffield Department of Surgical Sciences, University of Oxford. For services to Surgical and Cancer Sciences
- Stephen Dominic Hicks, chair, The Trussell Trust. For services to Charity
- Bronagh Anne Hinds, co-founder, Northern Ireland Women's Coalition. For services to Peace and Promoting Women's Rights
- Professor Christine Holt, FRS, FMedSci, Professor of Developmental Neuroscience, University of Cambridge. For services to Neuroscience
- Emily Victoria Holzhausen, OBE, Director of Policy and Public Affairs, Carers UK. For services to Unpaid Carers
- Professor Paul Howarth, FREng, chief executive officer, National Nuclear Laboratory. For services to the Energy Sector
- Armando Iannucci, OBE, Writer, Director and Producer. For services to Film and Television
- Professor John Thomas Sirr Irvine, Professor of Chemistry, University of St Andrews. For services to the Green Economy
- Professor Michael Izza, Lately Chief Executive, Institute of Chartered Accountants in England and Wales. For services to Accounting, Audit and to Sustainability
- Greg Jackson, chief executive officer, Octopus Energy. For services to the Energy Industry
- Dr Jeff James, chief executive officer and Keeper of the Public Record, The National Archives. For services to Archives and the Public Record
- Alex Jennings, Actor. For services to Drama
- Alan Jope, Lately Chief Executive Officer, Unilever. For services to Business
- Brian Anthony Charles Kingham, Founder and chairman, Reliance Security Group. For services to Business, to the Economy and to Charity
- Nick Maughan, Founder, The Nick Maughan Foundation. For services to Philanthropy
- Professor Patrick Maxwell, FMedSci, Regius Professor of Physic and Head of School of Clinical Medicine, University of Cambridge. For services to Medical Research
- Gregor Anthony McGill, Lately Director of Legal Services, Crown Prosecution Service. For services to Law and Order
- Professor David Krishna Menon, FMedSci, Head of Division of Anaesthesia, University of Cambridge. For services to Neurocritical Care
- Professor Rachel Mills, Senior Vice President (Academic), King's College London. For services to Marine Science
- Dr Ann Wilson Moulds, Founder, Trustee and lately chief executive officer, Action Against Stalking. For services to Victims of Stalking
- Jon Moulton, Founder and Investor, Jon Moulton Charitable Trust. For Charitable Service
- Peter Carl Mucklow, Lately Director for Apprenticeships, Department for Education. For services to Education
- Jonathan Nancekivell-Smith, Director Strategic Finance, Ministry of Justice. For Public Service
- Roy Noble, OBE, DL. For services to Welsh Culture and Language, and to the community in Wales
- Michael Aslan Norton, OBE, Founder and Trustee, Centre for Innovation in Voluntary Action. For services to Social Entrepreneurship and Philanthropy in the UK and Abroad
- Professor Washington Yotto Ochieng, FREng, Head, Department of Civil and Environmental Engineering and Chair Professor in Positioning and Navigation Systems, Imperial College London. For services to Global Positioning and Navigation Systems
- Professor Okechukwu Emmanuel Ogbonna, Professor of Management and Organisation, Cardiff University. For services to People from Ethnic Minority Backgrounds and Anti-Racism
- Marc Russell Owen, OBE, Director, UK Visas and Immigration, Home Office. For Public Service
- Paul Morton Alistair Phillips-Davies, Chief Executive, SSE plc. For services to the Energy Industry and Net Zero
- Elizabeth Mary Alice Pitman, Lately Non-Executive Board Member and Government Reviewer, Department for the Environment, Food and Rural Affairs. For services to Government
- Julia Elizabeth Prescot, deputy chair, National Infrastructure Commission. For Public Service
- Asif Rangoonwala, chair, Rangoonwala Foundation. For services to Charity and to Philanthropy
- Professor Barbara Jacquelyn Sahakian, FBA, FMedSci, Professor of Clinical Neuropsychology, University of Cambridge. For services to Research in Human Cognitive Processes
- Professor Laura Maria Serrant, OBE, Lately Regional Head, Nursing and Midwifery, Workforce Training and Education Directorate, NHS England North East and Yorkshire. For services to Nursing
- Dipesh Jayantilal Shah, OBE, Lately Chair, National Highways. For services to Transport
- Martin Leslie Sim, Lately Deputy Further Education Commissioner. For services to Further Education
- Barbara Slater, OBE, Director, BBC Sport. For services to Sports Broadcasting
- Professor Terence Kenneth Smith, Director, Biomedical Sciences Research Complex, University of St Andrews. For services to Disease Research
- Graeme James Souness. For services to Association Football and to Charity
- Dr Fiona Margaret Spencer, Advisory Director, Infrastructure and Project Authority, Cabinet Office. For Public Service
- Iain Stewart, Lately Member of Parliament for Milton Keynes South and chair, Transport Select Committee For Political and Public Service
- Dr Alexander Sturgis, Director, Ashmolean Museum and Art Historian. For services to Culture
- Dr Paul Thompson, Vice-Chancellor, Royal College of Art. For services to the Arts
- Paddy Tipping. For Parliamentary and Political Service
- Jacqueline Toogood, Lately Deputy Director People, Air Command, Ministry of Defence. For services to Defence Personnel
- Professor Elizabeth Tulip Treasure, Lately Vice-Chancellor, Aberystwyth University. For services to Higher Education and to the community in Aberystwyth and Ceredigion
- Professor Elizabeth Emma Varga, Director, Infrastructure Systems Institute. For services to Critical Infrastructure
- Dr Alison Vincent, FREng, Non-Executive Director, Synectics plc, SEI Investments Ltd and Connected Places Catapult. For services to Engineering and Technology
- Professor Ian Walmsley, FRS, Provost, Imperial College London. For services to Science and to Quantum Technologies
- Professor Jonathan Norden Weber, Lately Dean, Faculty of Medicine, Imperial College London. For services to Global Medical Science
- Duncan Anthony Webster, OBE, JP, National Leadership Magistrate and chair, Magistrates' Leadership Executive. For services to Justice
- Matthew Crispin Hurst Westerman, Lately Chair, Imperial War Museums. For services to Museums and to Cultural Heritage
- Professor Ian Hugh White, Vice-Chancellor and President, University of Bath. For services to Higher Education and to Engineering
- Lesley Margaret Wild, Lately Chair, Bettys and Taylors. For services to Business and Trade
- Robert Stanley Lawrence Woodward, chair of the board, Met Office. For services to Public Sector Development
- David John Grey Wright, Director, UK Safer Internet Centre. For services to the Safety of Children and Young People
- Alan Yentob, Broadcaster and Television Executive. For services to the Arts and Media

==== Officer of the Order of the British Empire (OBE) ====
Military

- Commodore Andrew John Aitken
- Commander Stephen Brian
- Lieutenant Colonel Oliver William Denning
- ~~Commander Iain Buchan Fergusson~~ (appointment cancelled on 1 August 2025.)
- Commander James Howard
- Colonel Aran Ernest Kingston Jess
- Lieutenant Colonel (now Acting Colonel) Craig Edward Renney

Civil

- Trudi Abadi, BEM – Officer, National Crime Agency. For services to Law Enforcement
- Tabassum Rizwan Ahmad – chief executive officer, EmployAbility. For services to Inclusive Access to Employment for Neurodivergent and Disabled Young People
- Andrea Isabel Albutt – Lately President, Prison Governors Association. For services to HM Prison and Probation Service
- Douglas George Allan – Cameraman and Marine Conservationist. For services to the Broadcast Media and to the Promotion of Environmental Awareness
- Richard Allcroft – President, World Wheelchair Rugby. For services to Wheelchair Rugby
- Jeremy Michael Allen – Deputy Director, Energy Infrastructure Group, Department for Energy Security and Net Zero. For services to Energy Consumers and Energy Security
- Amira Amzour – Deputy Director, Environment Bill, Department for Environment, Food and Rural Affairs. For services to Environmental Legislation
- Richard William Angell – chief executive officer, Terrence Higgins Trust. For services to Charity
- Anthony Francis Arbour, JP – Lately London Assembly Member. For Public Service
- Shalni Arora – Founder Trustee, Belong and Founder, Savannah Wisdom Charitable Foundation. For services to Charity and to Philanthropy
- Dr Adam Robert Baker – Head, Fusion Policy, Department for Energy Security and Net Zero. For services to Fusion Energy
- Thalia Marietta Baldwin – Lately Director, Geospatial Commission. For Public Service
- Andrew Stephen Barber – For services to the community in East Yorkshire
- Wayne Barnes – Referee. For services to Rugby Union
- Daniela Barone-Soares – chief executive officer, Snowball Impact Investments. For services to Business and to Impact Investing
- Jonathan Bartrop – Team Leader, Ministry of Defence. For services to Defence
- Katherine Ann Bavington – Finance Business Partner, Weapons Operating Centre, Defence Equipment and Support. For services to Defence Procurement
- Susan Jane Bent – Lately Chief Executive Officer, Central England Law Centre. For services to the Law and to Vulnerable Citizens
- Christopher Thomas Berridge – Managing Director, Paneltex. For services to Business, to Exports and to the Environment
- Dr Barry Quentin Blackwell – Head, UK Building Information Modelling and National Digital Twin Programmes, Department for Business and Trade. For services to Technology Development and to the Construction Sector
- Alexandra Helen Bolton – Director, Climate Governance Initiative. For services to the Built and Natural Environment
- Professor Jamshed Bomanji – Head, Clinical Department, Institute of Nuclear Medicine, University College London Hospitals NHS Foundation Trust. For services to the NHS and to Global Nuclear Medicine
- Philippa Ann Bonay – Director, Operations, Office for National Statistics. For Public and Charitable Services
- Dr Helen Elizabeth Bonwick – chair, Association for Palliative Medicine of Great Britain and Ireland. For services to Palliative Care
- Professor Tracy Joanne Borman – chief executive officer, Heritage Education Trust and Joint Chief Curator, Historic Royal Palaces. For services to Heritage
- Professor Joanna Bourke, FBA – Professor of History, Birkbeck, University of London. For services to the Social Sciences
- Kieron John Boyle – chief executive officer, Impact Investing Institute. For services to Impact Investment and Impact Economy
- Carol Boys – chief executive officer, Down's Syndrome Association. For services to Special Educational Needs and Disabilities and to Research
- Edward George Bracher – Lately Chief Executive Officer, Riding for the Disabled Association and Founder and chair, Equine Assisted Services Partnership. For services to Disabled People
- Karen Elaine Bramwell – chief executive officer, Forward As One Church of England Multi-Academy Trust, Bolton. For services to Education
- Dr Yvonne Klara Braun – Director of Policy, Long Term Savings, Health and Protection, Association of British Insurers. For services to the Pensions Industry and to Socio-Economic Diversity
- Dr Joanne Bray – Deputy Director, Automotive Unit, Department for Business and Trade. For services to the Automotive Industry
- John Myles Milton Bright – Costume Designer. For services to Costume Design and to Heritage
- Paul Gregory Brinkworth – Case Controller, Serious Fraud Office. For services to Justice
- Joanne Susan Broadwood – chief executive officer, Leap Confronting Conflict and Member, Advisory Board and lately chief executive officer, Belong, The Cohesion and Integration Network. For services to Social Cohesion
- Penelope Brockman – Finance Director, Mountain Rescue England and Wales, and chair and lately Team Leader, Central Beacons Mountain Rescue Team. For services to Mountain Rescue
- Darren Andrew Brown – Honorary Clinical Academic Physiotherapist, Chelsea and Westminster Hospital NHS Foundation Trust. For services to the NHS and to People Living with HIV and AIDS, and People with Long Covid
- Dr Jenny Brown, FRSE – Literary Agent. For services to Literature
- Tania Sara Bryer – chair, National Events Committee, Cancer Research UK and Ambassador, Alzheimer's Society. For services to Charity
- Professor Harriet Ann Bulkeley, FBA – Professor of Geography and Deputy Executive Dean, Research, Durham University. For services to Geography and to Environmental Governance
- Commander (Rtd) Gary Robert Bushell, RN – Director Cadets and Youth, Council of Reserve Forces and Cadets Associations. For services to the Armed Forces Cadets
- Fleur Josephine Butler – Lately President, National Conservative Convention and lately chair, Conservative Women's Organisation. For services to Politics and to Women
- Dr Rabinder Kaur Buttar – Senior Enterprise Fellow, Strathclyde University. For services to Innovation, Entrepreneurship and Leadership in Business, and to Life Sciences
- Sonya Naiken Byers – chief executive officer, Women in Transport and Patron, Women on the Move Against Cancer. For services to Diversity
- Benjamin Hugo Cairns – Founder and chief executive officer, Institute for Voluntary Action Research. For services to Charity and to the Voluntary Sector
- Henrietta Nina Sylvia Campbell – For services to British Interior Design and to Philanthropy
- Karen Julia Carney, MBE – Footballer. For services to Association Football
- Joanna Jane Carrington (joanna wallace) – Independent Case Examiner, Department for Work and Pensions. For Public Service
- Robert Henry Caudwell – Lately Chair, Lowland Agricultural Peat Task Force. For services to Lowland Peat Carbon Stores and to Food Security
- Rory Cellan-Jones – Author and Journalist. For services to Journalism
- Dr Susan Olivia Chapple – Founder and Chair of Trustees, Horatio's Garden Charity. For services to People with Spinal Injuries
- Richard Denis Paul Charkin – Lately President, International Publishers Association. For services to Publishing and Literature
- Karen Michelle Charters – Head, International Slavery Museum, National Museums Liverpool, and lately chief executive officer, Kuumba Imani Millennium Centre and Associated Trustee, National Museums Liverpool. For services to the community in Liverpool, Merseyside
- Laura Francoise Citron – chief executive officer, London and Partners. For services to the London Economy
- Elaine Clark – Chief Executive, Rail Forum. For services to the Rail Supply Industry
- Dr Belinda Rosanna Clarke – Director, Agri-TechE. For services to Agri-Technologies and Farming
- Joseph Aaron Coelho – Children's Laureate. For services to the Arts, to Children's Reading and to Literature
- Kathleen Margaret Coombes – Founder, Association for Rehabilitation of Communication and Oral Skills (ARCOS). For charitable services to People with Communication and/or Swallowing Difficulties
- Giles Cooper – chair, The Royal Variety Charity. For services to Entertainment and to Charity
- Tina Louise Costello – chief executive officer, Heart of England Community Foundation. For services to Charity and Voluntary Organisations across the West Midlands and Warwickshire
- David Cunningham – Officer, National Crime Agency. For services to Law Enforcement
- Emma Louise Dagnes – Managing Director and Acting Chief Executive Officer, Alexandra Park and Palace. For services to Heritage
- Emyr Afan Davies – chief executive officer, Afanti Media. For services to Media and to Music in Wales
- Professor Jane Carolyn Davies – Professor of Paediatric Respirology and Experimental Medicine, Imperial College London. For services to People with Cystic Fibrosis
- Katharine Anne Davies – Deputy Director, Security and Business Continuity, Department for Business and Trade. For services to Government Security
- Alastair Davis – chief executive officer, Social Investment Scotland. For services to Social Enterprise and to Charity in Scotland
- Professor Anne Christine Davis – Professor of Mathematical Physics, University of Cambridge. For services to Higher Education and to Scientific Research
- Ronald Joseph Dawson – For services to Fundraising and to Charity in Northern Ireland and Abroad
- Dr Jeanelle Louise de Gruchy – Lately President, Association of Directors of Public Health and chair, Greater Manchester Directors of Public Health. For services to Public Health
- Andrew Peter Dent, MVO – Lately Director, Transformation, Change and Programmes, Building Digital UK. For Public Service
- Pamela Dudek – Chief Executive, NHS Highland. For services to the NHS in Scotland
- Peter Vincent Dyer – President, British Dental Association. For services to Dentistry, to Medicine and to the communities of Silverdale and Lancaster
- Olive Essien – Legal Manager, Crown Prosecution Service. For services to Community Engagement
- Kevin Etheridge – Councillor, Caerphilly County Borough Council. For services to Local Government
- Rebecca Angharad Evans – Head, Strategic Communications, Ceremonials Team, Department for Culture, Media and Sport. For services to Communications
- Susan Ann Evans – chief executive officer, Social Care Wales. For services to Social Care
- Catherine Eves – Lately Chair, Brook House Inquiry. For Public Service
- Cemal Ezel – chief executive officer, Change Please. For services to Social Enterprise and to Homeless People
- David John Fairbank – Head, Central Services Team, Visa Status and Information Services, Home Office. For services to International Relations
- Paul Fannon – Fellow, Christ's College, Cambridge, and Volunteer, United Kingdom Mathematics Trust. For services to Education
- Professor Rhian Mair Fenn – Professor of Medical Education and Honorary Consultant Rheumatologist, Cardiff University. For services to Medical Education
- Professor Donna Fitzsimons – Head, School of Nursing and Midwifery, Queen's University Belfast. For services to Healthcare and to Education
- Colleen Fletcher – Lately Member of Parliament for Coventry North East. For Parliamentary and Political Service
- Professor Anthony Richard Fooks – Lead Scientist, International Development, Animal and Plant Health Agency. For services to Animal Health and Welfare
- Andrew John Forsey – National Director, Feeding Britain. For services to Education
- Professor Geoffrey Michael Gadd – Boyd Baxter Chair of Biology, University of Dundee. For services to Mycology and Environmental Microbiology
- Jacqueline Gedman – Lately Chief Executive, Kirklees Council. For services to Business and to the community in Kirklees, West Yorkshire
- Wanda Goldwag – chair, Lease. For services to Leaseholders
- Georgia Gould – Councillor and Leader, London Borough of Camden Council. For services to Local Government
- Veronica Susan Greenwood – Lately Chair, British and Irish Orthoptic Society. For services to Orthoptics
- Dr David Andrew Griffiths-Johnson – Head, Manufacturing Funds, Partnerships and Innovation, Office for Life Sciences. For services to Life Sciences
- Professor Qing Gu – Director, University College London Centre for Educational Leadership. For services to Education
- Professor Ian Melvyn Hall – Professor of Mathematical Epidemiology and Statistics, University of Manchester and Senior Principal Modeller, UK Health Security Agency. For services to Public Health, to Epidemiology and to Adult Social Care, particularly during COVID-19
- James Handscombe – Founding Principal, Harris Westminster Sixth Form, London. For services to Education
- William Harwood – Team Leader, Ministry of Defence. For services to Defence
- Michael Andrew Rhys Hawes – chief executive officer, Society of Motor Manufacturers and Traders. For services to the Automotive Industry
- Vivienne Mary Hayes, MBE – chief executive officer, Women's Resource Centre. For services to Social Justice
- John Gerard Heffernan – Managing Director, Fern Innovation Ltd. For services to Business and to Technology
- John Thomas Hill – Director, Technology and Strategy, The Welding Institute. For services to SMEs, to the Research Institutes Sector, to Local Economic Development and to Higher Education
- Celia Hodson – Founder and chief executive officer, Hey Girls. For services to Promoting Period Dignity and Raising Awareness of Free Period Products in Scotland
- Professor Katrin Hohl – Professor of Criminology and Criminal Justice, City, University of London. For services to Victims of Sexual Violence
- Charles Michael Holloway – Philanthropist and Founder, The Charles Michael Holloway Charitable Trust. For services to Charitable Fundraising in the Arts
- Lorrayne Hughes – chief executive officer, Cumbria Education Trust. For services to Education
- Julie Christine Humphreys – Deputy Director, Scottish Government. For services to Tackling Child Poverty in Scotland
- Dr Richard David Jarvis – Lately Chief Executive, Judicial Appointments Commission. For services to Judicial Appointments
- Junior Charles Johnson – Director of Operations, Food Standards Agency. For Public and Voluntary Service
- Stephen Michael Johnson-Proctor – Lately Regional Probation Director, East of England Probation Service. For services to Probation
- Philip Alexander Francis Johnston (philip bernays) – Lately Chief Executive Officer, Newcastle Theatre Royal Trust. For services to Drama
- Christopher Phillip Jones – chair, Waste Industry Safety and Health. For services to Health and Safety
- Ian Martin Jones – Founder, Goonhilly Earth Station Ltd. For services to Space Communications
- Professor Shruti Kapila – Professor of History and Politics, Corpus Christi College, University of Cambridge. For services to Research in Humanities
- Heather Ruth Keates – chief executive officer, Community Money Advice. For services to Debt Advice
- Sharon Jane Kemp – Chief Executive, Rotherham Metropolitan Borough Council. For services to Business and to the community in Rotherham, South Yorkshire
- Duncan James King – Lately Director of Resources, Home Office. For Public Service
- Professor Paul Edward Klapper – Professor of Clinical Virology, University of Manchester. For services to Viral Diagnostic Testing
- The Very Revd Julian Peter Large – Provost, Brompton Oratory. For services to Faith and Integration
- Gary Michael Lashko – chief executive officer, Royal Hospital Chelsea. For services to Veterans
- Martin Lawlor – Chief Executive, Port of Blyth. For services to Ports, to Maritime and to the Offshore Energy Industry
- Margaret Anne Lee – Lately Finance Commissioner. For services to Local Government
- Alan Bryan Lenton – chair, The Lest We Forget Association. For services to Veterans and their Families
- Janet Lewis – Deputy Director, Cabinet Office Legal Advisers, Government Legal Department. For Public Service
- Simon David Lewis – Senior Manager, Department for Work and Pensions. For services to Capability and Learning
- Sally Elizabeth Light – Lately Chief Executive, Motor Neurone Disease Association. For services to People Affected by Motor Neurone Disease
- Tina Janet Lovey – chief executive officer, Rivermead Inclusive Trust, Medway, Kent. For services to Children with Special Educational Needs and Disabilities
- Alexander Walter Barr Lyle, MBE – Golfer. For services to Golf
- Lucy Elizabeth Lytle (lulu lytle) – Founder and Creative Director, Soane Britain Ltd. For services to British Manufacturing and Craftsmanship
- Sally MacDonald – Director, Science and Industry Museum. For services to the Arts and to Heritage
- Nicholas Peter MacLean – Trade and Investment Envoy, Scottish Government. For services to Trade and to Bilateral Relations
- Murdo James MacMillan – Deputy Director, Home Office. For services to Border Security and to Crime Prevention
- Orla Mary MacRae – Deputy Director, Department for Science Innovation and Technology. For services to Online Safety
- Rosh Mahtani – Founder, Alighieri Jewellery. For services to Jewellery Design and to Philanthropy
- Moira Marder, DL – chief executive officer, Ted Wragg Trust. For services to Education
- Dr David Paul Marshall – Lately Director of Census, Northern Ireland Statistics and Research Agency. For services to Official Statistics and Census-taking in Northern Ireland
- Ruth Barbara Louise Marvel – chief executive officer, Duke of Edinburgh's Awards. For services to Young People
- Rachel Louise Maze – Deputy Head, Office for Quantum, Department for Science, Innovation and Technology. For services to Quantum Technologies
- Dr James McAleer – Consultant Clinical Oncologist, Northern Ireland Cancer Centre. For services to Cancer Care and Treatment in Northern Ireland
- Alistair Murdoch McCoist, MBE – For services to Association Football and to Broadcasting
- Peter Daniel McCrea – Lately Chair, LionHeart RICS. For services to the Profession of Chartered Surveyors
- Paul John McGurnaghan – Director, Digital Services, Department for Agriculture, Environment, and Rural Affairs, Northern Ireland Civil Service. For services to Information Technology and Digital Innovation
- Alison McKenzie-Folan – Chief Executive, Wigan Borough Council. For services to Local Government
- Dr John David McKeown – Veterinary Surgeon. For services to the Veterinary Profession
- Paul Malcolm McKinlay, FREng – Senior Vice President and Director, Airbus UK. For services to Welsh Industry
- William Niel McLean – Chair of Trustees, Learning Foundation. For services to Education
- Sarah Jane McLeod – chief executive officer, Wentworth Woodhouse Preservation Trust. For services to Heritage
- Patrick Martin Melia – Chief Executive, Sunderland City Council. For services to Local Government
- Leigh John Middleton – chief executive officer, National Youth Agency. For services to Young People
- Kevin Stuart Miles – Chief Executive, Football Supporters' Association. For services to Association Football
- Margaret Moore – Vice-chair, Board of the Fundraising Regulator. For services to Charities
- Timothy Michael Mordan – Lately Deputy Director, Innovation, Productivity and Science, Department for Environment, Food and Rural Affairs. For Public Service
- James George Morris – Lately Member of Parliament for Halesowen and Rowley Regis. For Political and Public Service
- Michael James Morrison – Lately Master, The Worshipful Company of Carpenters. For services to Heritage
- Gareth Michael Niblett – Incident and Crisis Response Business Partner, Department for Work and Pensions. For services to Benefit and Pension Provision
- Suzannah Marie Nichol, MBE – chief executive officer, Build UK. For services to the Construction Industry
- Wendy Ruth Nichols – Public and Community Service Member and lately chair, National Executive Committee, Labour Party and President of UNISON. For Political Service.
- Karen Anne O'Donoghue-Harris – chair, Rhoose Lifeguards. For services to Maritime Safety
- Camilla Anne Oldland – chief executive officer, Living Paintings. For services to People with Visual Impairments
- Timothy Gerald Oliver – Councillor and Leader, Surrey County Council. For services to Local Government
- Hugh Richard Oliver-Bellasis – Vice-president, Game and Wildlife Conservation Trust. For services to Nature Conservation and to the Rural Community
- Professor Henry George Overman – Professor of Economic Geography, London School of Economics and Director, What Works Centre. For services to Local Growth
- David James Parks – Founder and managing director, The Skill Mill. For services to Young People
- Charlotte Pike – Policy Adviser, Cabinet Office. For Public Service
- Nicholas Poole – Lately Chief Executive Officer, Chartered Institute of Library and Information Professionals. For services to Libraries, to the Arts and to Museums
- Derek Provan – Lately Chief Executive, Aberdeen, Glasgow and Southampton Airports. For services to the Aviation Industry.
- Professor Noel David Purdy – Director of Research and Scholarship, Stranmillis University College, Belfast. For services to Education.
- Chella Quint – Period Positive Campaigner, Author and Educator. For services to Education
- Shireen Razey – chief executive officer and Executive Principal, Christ The King Sixth Form College, Kent. For services to Further Education
- Bruno James Michael Reddy – Founder and chief executive officer, Maths Circle, Ampthill, Bedfordshire. For services to Education
- Julie Richards – Principal and chief executive officer, Chesterfield College, Derbyshire. For services to Further Education
- Lieutenant Colonel (Rtd) Francis Thomas James Anthony Riley – Lately Director, National Firearms Centre, Royal Armouries. For services to Military Heritage
- Dr David Rollinson – Scientific Associate, Natural History Museum. For services to Museum Science and to Public Health
- Samantha Elizabeth Rose – Deputy Director, Data and Analysis Division, Department for Transport. For services to Advanced Analytics
- Professor Matthew Rosseinsky, FRS – Professor of Inorganic Chemistry, University of Liverpool. For services to Materials Chemistry Research and Innovation
- David Harley Athol Rowe – Honorary Treasurer, Soldiers', Sailors' and Airmen's Families Association. For services to the Armed Forces Community
- David Dewar Russell – Senior Project Manager, Land Combat Vehicles, Defence Equipment and Support. For services to Defence
- Edward John Russell – Chief Executive, WCS Care Group Ltd. For services to Care Home Residents
- Rachel Alison Sandison – Deputy Vice-Chancellor (External Engagement) and Vice-Principal (External Relations), University of Glasgow. For services to Higher Education
- Danyal Nurus Sattar – chief executive officer, Big Issue Invest. For services to Business and Social Finance
- Professor Diane Gail Owen Saunders – Group Leader, John Innes Centre. For services to Plant Science, Agriculture and to Women in STEM
- Katherine Helen Sciver-Brunt – Lately Cricketer. For services to Women's Cricket and to the community in Yorkshire
- Joy Dorothea Elizabeth Margaret Agnes Scott – Lately Chair, Clanmil Housing Association. For services to Social Housing in Northern Ireland
- Dr Anna Claire Severwright – Convenor and Adviser, Social Care Future and In Control. For services to Disabled People
- Professor Dudley Edmund Shallcross – Lately Chief Executive Officer, Primary Science Teaching Trust, Bristol. For services to Education.
- Dr Hannana Siddiqui – Head of Policy, Complaints and Research, Southhall Black Sisters. For services to the Prevention of Violence Against Women
- Mark Shaun Simms – chief executive officer, P3 Charity. For services to Social Enterprise
- Professor Mervyn Singer – Professor of Intensive Care Medicine, University College London and Director, Bloomsbury Institute of Intensive Care Medicine. For services to Intensive Care
- Ruth Sloan – Deputy Director, Legacy, Northern Ireland Office. For services to Peace and Reconciliation in Northern Ireland
- Martin Richard Slumbers – chief executive officer and Secretary, The Royal and Ancient Golf Club. For services to Golf
- William Ian Smith – Head of Ultrasound, Clinical Diagnostic Services LLP. For services to Women's Healthcare
- Jane Wyman Spiers – chair, National Theatre of Scotland. For services to Culture in Scotland
- Professor Rhona Winifred Stainthorp – Emerita Professor of Education, University of Reading. For services to Education
- Vivian Michael Sternberg, KC – President and lately chair, The Faith and Belief Forum. For services to Faith and Integration
- John Kyle Stone – Entrepreneur. For services to Philanthropy
- Martin John Swales – Chief Executive, South Yorkshire Mayoral Combined Authority. For services to Local Government
- Nicholas Roger Swales, DL – For services to the community in Tyne and Wear
- Tracy Marie Swinburne – chief executive officer, Accomplish Multi Academy Trust and Executive Head and English Hub Lead, Jerry Clay Wakefield, West Yorkshire. For services to Education
- Ray Tang – Lately Director, Communications, Department for Levelling Up, Housing and Communities. For Public Service
- Philip Geoffrey Target-Adams – Musician and Producer. For services to Music
- Nicolas Mark Alexander Temple – chief executive officer, Social Investment Business. For services to Social Enterprise
- Professor Rajesh Vasantlal Thakker – Lately President, Society for Endocrinology. For services to Medical Science and to People with Hereditary and Rare Disorders
- Subhash Vithaldas Thakrar – Lately Chair, London Chamber of Commerce. For services to British Trade and Investment in Africa
- Peter James Thomas – Lately Chief Executive Officer, The Futures Trust, West and East Midlands. For services to Education.
- David Charles Tibble – Trustee, Inspiration Trust. For services to Education and to Philanthropy in Norfolk
- Kate Helena Tinsley – Chief Executive, MKM Building Supplies. For services to the Construction Sector and to Diversity
- Ian Denton Turner – Co-chair, National Care Association and lately chair, Registered Nursing Home Association. For services to Social Care
- Karen Ann Turner – Leader, Traveller Education Support and Asylum Seeker and Refugee Support, Education Authority. For services to Education, to Minority Ethnic Support Services in Northern Ireland and to Speech and Drama
- Elizabeth Visick – Team Leader, Ministry of Defence. For services to Defence
- Beate Wagner – Lately Director of Children's Services, Wakefield Metropolitan District Council. For services to Education
- Professor Thomas David Waite – Deputy Chief Medical Officer, Department of Health and Social Care. For services to Public Health
- Professor Richard Wakeford – Professor of Epidemiology, Centre for Occupational and Environmental Health, University of Manchester. For services to the Advancement of the Science of Radiation Protection
- Rachael Anne-Marie Wardell – Executive Director, Children, Families and Lifelong Learning, Surrey County Council. For services to Children's Social Care
- Professor Brian James Webster-Henderson – Deputy Vice-Chancellor and Professor of Nursing, University of Cumbria and lately chair, Council of Deans of Health. For services to the NHS and to Education
- Shamit Weinberger-Gaiger – Managing Director, West Coast Partnership Development. For services to the Rail Sector
- Humphrey Giles Welfare – For services to Heritage in the North of England
- Christopher James White – Lately Member and Leader, St Albans City and District Council. For services to Local Government
- Kimberly Harper Wiehl – Board Member, UK Export Finance. For services to Export Credit Finance and to International Trade
- Brian Edward Williams, MBE – Head, Inquiries Sponsorship, Cabinet Office. For Public Service
- Helen Anne Lentle Williams (helen lentle) – Lately Director, Legal Services, Welsh Government. For services to Devolution and the Legislative Process in Wales
- Professor Matthew Woollard – Professor of Data Policy and Governance, UK Data Archive, University of Essex. For services to Data Science
- Carl Woollins – Managing Director UK and Ireland, Nippon Gases. For services to the Chemicals Industry
- Sarah Ann Workman – Lately Director, Adult Services, Stockton-on-Tees Borough Council. For services to Adult Social Care and Health
- Andrew Richard Wright – Lately Head Teacher, Harborne Hill School, Birmingham. For services to Children in Care, Care Experienced Young People and to the Education Community
- Jennifer Beatrice Wynn – For Charitable and Public Service
- Lesslie Anne Young – Chief Executive, Epilepsy Scotland. For services to People with Epilepsy in Scotland

==== Member of the Order of the British Empire (MBE) ====
Military

- Major Matthew Adams
- Colour Sergeant David Robert Bartlett
- Warrant Officer 2 Marcus Bassett
- Commander Liam Bernard Byrd
- Major Mark Ashley Carroll
- Petty Officer Engineering Technician (Communications and Information Systems Submarines) Matthew Connick
- Chief Petty Officer Engineering Technician (Communications and Information Systems) Adrian David Grimes
- Commander Christopher Hill
- Lieutenant Commander (now Acting Commander) Alasdair Magill
- Lieutenant Commander Lyndsay Ann Oldridge
- Captain Mark Williams

Civil

- Nicola Abraham – Founder, Jacob Abraham Foundation. For services to Suicide Prevention in South Wales
- Kathleen Abu-bakir – GMB Representative, National Executive Committee, Labour Party. For Political Service
- Jayne Acton – Qualified Social Worker, Wigan Council. For services to Children and Families
- Ian McLean Adams – LGBTQ+ Leader and Social Inclusion Advocate. For services to LGBTQ+ People and to the community in the City of Westminster
- Jeremy Raymond David Adams – For services to Disability Sport
- Sharron Adams – Manager, COVID-19 Children's Home, Cornwall County Council. For services to Disabled Children and Young People
- Valerie Margaret Elizabeth Adams – For services to Archives in Northern Ireland
- William Edward Adamson – Northern Ireland Development Officer, National Sheep Association. For services to the Sheep Industry
- Jacqueline Adie – Centre Manager, York Christians Against Poverty Debt. For services to People in Debt in York
- Andrew Airey – Fundraiser, 3 Dads Walking for Papyrus UK. For services to the Prevention of Young Suicide
- David Rhys Allen – Executive Head Teacher, Links Multi Academy Trust, St Albans, Hertfordshire. For services to Education
- Susan Veronica Ashby – chair and Trustee, Stepping Stone Projects. For services to Homeless and Vulnerable People in Rochdale, Greater Manchester
- Rachel Ashe – Founder and managing director, Mental Health Swims. For services to People with Mental Health Issues
- Saima Ashraf – Senior Finance Auditor, Merseyside Police. For services to Policing
- Alan Ashton – Chief Executive, St Helens Carers Centre. For services to the community in St Helens, Merseyside
- Halima Hashim Atcha – Diversity and Inclusion Lead, North West and North Central, Work and Health Service, Department for Work and Pensions. For services to Diversity and Inclusion
- Professor Angus Atkinson – Senior Marine Ecologist, Plymouth Marine Laboratory. For services to Polar Marine Research and Conservation
- Anthony Atkinson – For services to Wildlife and Ecology
- Sally Therese Atkinson – For services to Education and to the community in the London Borough of Barnet
- Dr Margaret Wendy Elizabeth Austin – Lately Chief Medical Adviser, St John Ambulance. For services to St John Ambulance and to First Aid Training
- Rose Lucinda Ayling Ellis – For voluntary services to the Deaf Community
- Clara Bagenal george – Founder, Low Energy Transformation Initiative. For services to the Built Environment and to Climate Change
- Jessamy Rachel Baird – Lately Vice President, The Association of the British Pharmaceutical Industry. For services to Healthcare Innovation
- Dr Louise Frances Ball – Head, Genetic Technology Regulatory Team, Department for Environment, Food and Rural Affairs. For services to Science and Technology
- Thomas George Bastin – Head, International Energy Institutions Team, Department for Energy Security and Net Zero. For services to Energy Security, Affordability and Accessibility
- Craig Simon Batham – Special Chief Officer, South Yorkshire Police. For services to Policing
- The Reverend Professor Alison Baverstock – Founder, Reading Force. For charitable services to Families in the British Armed Forces Community
- Anthony Alderson Baverstock – chair, Duke of Edinburgh's Award Gillingham, Dorset. For services to Young People in Dorset
- Hannah George Waller Beaton-hawryluk – chair, Edinburgh Branch, Association of Ukrainians in Great Britain. For services to the Ukrainian Community in Scotland
- Dr Nistor-Dumitru Becia – Lately Senior Psychologist, Swansea Bay University Health Board. For services to Ukrainian Refugees
- Duncan Ademola Beckley, JP – Conductor. For services to Music
- Andrew John Beddows – Managing Director, Ideas Network UK Community Interest Company. For services to Innovation and Business
- Dr Mary Jane Beek – Principal Social Worker, Norfolk County Council and Senior Research Fellow, University of East Anglia. For services to Children and Families
- Brian Alfred Beever – Group Treasurer, 36th/51st Scout Group, County Training Adviser and District Treasurer, Bablake Scout District. For services to Young People in Coventry
- Neville Lewis Beischer – chief executive officer, Flagship Learning Trust, Manchester. For services to Education
- Jacqui Karen Belfield-smith – Head, Youth Justice and Targeted Youth Services, Stockport Council and chair, Association of Youth Offending Team Managers. For services to Youth Justice
- Ernest Benbow – For services to the NHS, to Mental Health in Sport and to Education in St. Helens, Merseyside
- Genevieve Angela Bent – Assistant Principal, Harris Invictus Academy's Sixth Form, London Borough of Croydon. For services to Education
- Martin Berliner – Lately Chief Executive, Maccabi GB. For services to the Jewish Community
- John Mackenzie Beveridge – For services to Paddle Steamer Preservation and to Charity
- Pauline Marie Binns-tulloch – For services to the community in Greater Manchester
- Frank George Bird – Senior Network Planner, Resilience, Midlands Region, National Highways. For services to Transport
- Karen Amanda Bonner – Chief Nurse, Buckinghamshire Healthcare NHS Trust. For services to Nursing
- Jennifer Marie Bott – Founder and Developer, Rhythmic Gymnastics. For services to Gymnastics
- David Paul Boughey – For services to the community in Coventry, West Midlands
- Pauline Nicol Bowie – Founder and Director, Low Income Families Together. For services to the community in Muirhouse, Edinburgh
- Richard Georg Boyd – Senior Policy Adviser, Department for Business and Trade. For services to Mental Health
- Wendy Brading – For services to Journalism
- Alistair Bradley – Executive Leader, Chorley Council. For Political and Public Service
- Professor Elizabeth Anne Clewett Brierley (elizabeth price) – Deputy Pro-Vice-Chancellor for Sustainability, Manchester Metropolitan University. For services to Sustainability Education
- Esther Erica Britten – Deputy Director, Head of Major Events, UK Sport. For services to Sport
- Joyclen Brodie-mends buffong – Founder, RISE.365 CIC. For services to Young People and to Youth Empowerment
- Penelope Ann Broomhead – International Para-Athletics Classifier, World Para-Athletics. For services to International Disability Sport
- Heather Elizabeth Broughton – Lately Committee Member, National Lottery Heritage Fund, Midlands and East. For services to Heritage and to the community in the Midlands
- Deborah Marie Brown – Executive Director, Service Reform, Salford City Council. For services to Local Government
- Elva Brown – Lately Driving Examiner, Driver and Vehicle Standards Agency. For services to Road Safety
- Victoria Marie Brownlie – Chief, Policy, British Beauty Council. For services to the Hair and Beauty Industry
- Professor Clive Henry Buckberry, FREng – Co-founder and Engineering Fellow, Quanta Dialysis Technologies. For services to Medical Engineering
- Hari Bahadur Budha magar – Adventurer, Campaigner and Charitable Fundraiser. For services to Disability Awareness
- Pauline Alison Watson Burt – Lately Chief Executive Officer, Ffilm Cymru Wales. For services to Film
- Alison Margaret Cairns – For services to Renal Patients and their Families within the Western Health and Social Care Trust, Northern Ireland
- Professor Andrew Alexander Campbell – Professor of Practice in Tourism and lately chair, Wales Tourism Alliance. For services to Tourism
- James Joseph Campbell – Lately Business Support Services Manager, Northern Ireland Audit Office. For Public Service
- David Canning – Head, Digital Knowledge and Information Management, Cabinet Office. For services to Innovation in Knowledge and Information Management
- Jason David Carlyon – Community Engagement Lead and Paramedic, Yorkshire Ambulance Service NHS Trust. For services to Cardio-Pulmonary Resuscitation
- William George Alfred Carson – Founder, Container Ministry, Irish Methodist Mission Partnership. For services to the community in Northern Ireland and Abroad
- Rachel Anne Carter – Director of Midwifery and Deputy Chief Nurse, Birmingham Women's and Children's NHS Foundation Trust. For services to Maternity and Women's Health
- Natalie Cartmell – Partnerships Manager, Department for Work and Pensions. For services to Homeless People in Birmingham
- Alexandra Jane Castle (ally castle) – For services to Inclusivity and Diversity in Broadcasting
- Dr Rachel Sarah Century – Deputy Chief Executive, Holocaust Memorial Day Trust. For services to Holocaust Education and Commemoration
- Anton Chalk – Head of Fleet, Police Service of Scotland and lately chair, National Association of Police Fleet Managers. For services to Policing in Scotland
- Bryony Chapman – Lately Senior Marine Officer, Kent Wildlife Trust. For services to the Coastal and Marine Environment
- Namir Rahim Chowdhury – Regional Representative for Europe and the Americas, Commonwealth Youth Council. For services to Young People in the UK and Abroad
- Zia Us Samad Chowdhury, JP – For services to the Bangladeshi Community in the West Midlands
- Tom Ciesco – Atlas Performance Engineer, Airbus UK Ltd. For services to the Royal Air Force
- Diane Elizabeth Clark – chief executive officer, Passion for Learning, Ellesmere Port, Cheshire. For services to Education
- Faith Beatrice Clark – Life Vice-president and lately chair, Hearing Dogs for Deaf People. For services to Deaf People
- Beverly Carolyn Clarke – Lately National Community Manager, BCS, The Chartered Institute for IT. For services to Education
- Sarah Clarkson – Officer, National Crime Agency. For services to Law Enforcement
- Nicola Rose Close – Chief Executive, Association of Directors of Public Health. For services to Public Health
- David Michael Coles – Chair of Trustees, Manor Multi-Academy Trust, Wolverhampton. For services to Education
- David Corben – chair, Lifeboat Management Group, Swanage Lifeboat Station, Royal National Lifeboat Institution. For voluntary service to the Royal National Lifeboat Institution
- Beverley Roy Corry – For services to Athletics
- John George Corse – Owner, John G Corse Funeral Directors. For services to the community in Orkney
- Kay Cossington – Women's Technical Director, The Football Association. For services to Association Football
- Graham Edward Coulson – Ambassador, European Overture Diversity Network for Scouts and Guides. For services to Scouting and to the community in Selkirk, Roxburgh, Ettrick and Lauderdale
- Susan Crisp – Team Leader, Ministry of Defence. For services to Defence
- Desra Emma Cruise – Founder and Director, Portable Toilets Ltd. For services to Innovation and Outdoor Events Sustainability
- Roger Aleksandar Dakin – Entrepreneur, Smile Smart Technology. For services to Assistive Technology
- Archana Rao Dannamaneni – Customer Compliance Group, HM Revenue and Customs. For services to Tax Compliance
- Robyn Mary Davies – District Governor and Leader, Rotary Youth Leadership Award. For services to Young People and to the community in Telford, Shropshire
- Mark Nicholas Davis – Developer Remediation Lead, Department for Levelling Up, Housing and Communities. For services to Leaseholders
- Margaret Anne Davison – Lately Midwife, NHS Borders. For services to Midwifery
- Catherine Newland Dean – Grants Manager and Lately Chief Executive Officer, Save the Rhino International. For services to Conservation
- Dr Hannah Mary Dee – Founder and chair, Lovelace Colloquium. For services to Technology and to Women in the Information Technology Sector
- Emma Jane Degg – Chief Executive, North West Business Leadership Team. For services to Business and to the community in North West England
- Susie Dent – Lexicographer, Etymologist and Author. For services to Literature and to Language
- Dr Fiona Christine Devine – Co-founder and Chief Executive, Alexander Devine Children's Hospice Service. For services to Children's Hospice Care
- Balwinder Kaur Dhanoa – chief executive officer and Founder, Progress Care Group, West Midlands. For services to Children with SEND and their Families
- Michael George Dickson – For services to the Food Industry and to the community in Tyne and Wear
- Dr Patrick Dixon – Founder, Volunteer and Ambassador, ACET UK. For services to HIV and AIDS Care
- Charles Edward Dobson – Co-founder, The Starfish Trust. For charitable services to Children and Young Adults Living with Disabilities and Life-Threatening Illnesses
- Mary Dobson – Co-founder, The Starfish Trust. For charitable services to Children and Young Adults Living with Disabilities and Life-Threatening Illnesses
- Amy Dowden – Advocate and Ambassador, Crohn's and Colitis UK. For services to Fundraising and Raising Awareness of Inflammatory Bowel Disease
- Professor Elizabeth Sharon Draper – Emeritus Professor of Perinatal and Paediatric Epidemiology, University of Leicester. For services to Healthcare
- Patrick Joseph Duffy – For services to Special Olympics Sports and to Young People, particularly those with Learning Disabilities in the Newry and District Gateway Club
- Stephen Wilfred Duffy – Founder, Choose Life Project. For services to Drug Addiction Recovery and Education
- Clodagh Elizabeth Dunlop – For services to Stroke Survivors and to the Reform of Stroke Services
- Simon Jeremy Dunn – System Design Authority, Military Satellite Communications, Airbus Defence and Space (UK). For services to Defence
- Paula Durrans – Head, Security, Great Western Railway. For services to the Railway
- Bharati Dwarampudi – Advanced Customer Support Senior Leader, Department for Work and Pensions. For Public Service
- Puneet Dwivedi – For services to the community in Scotland
- Peter Thomas Eadie-Catling – Headteacher and Head of Centre, Woodlands Park Nursery School and Children's Centre, London Borough of Haringey. For services to Education
- Kevin Ebsworth – For services to Armed Forces Veterans and to Charity in Herefordshire
- Michael John Edwards – Founder and Life-Long President, My Life My Choice. For services to People with Learning Disabilities
- Robert James Elkington – Director, Arts Connect. For services to Young People
- Lady (Catherine) Erskine – Trustee and chair, Fife Region, Scotland's Gardens Scheme and chair, Discover Scottish Gardens. For services to Tourism in Scotland
- Susan Eustace – Lately Director of Public Affairs, The Advertising Association. For services to the Advertising Industry
- Craig Ellis Fellowes – Founder, Wildlife Training Consultancy. For services to Wildlife Protection
- Rebecca Caroline Ferguson – Singer, Songwriter and Music Industry Campaigner. For services to the Music Industry
- Maureen Ferrie – Founder, Greater Easterhouse Supporting Hands. For services to People Living With a Disability in Glasgow
- David Firth – For services to the Westbury Lions, Wiltshire
- David Fisher – Executive Director, Client Services, St Mungo's. For services to Homeless People
- Joanne Kathryn Fitzgerald – Senior Programme Manager, NHS England. For services to the NHS
- Dr John Edward Fitzgerald – Consultant Clinical Scientist and Head of Audiology Services, Norfolk and Norwich University Hospitals NHS Foundation Trust. For services to Audiology and to Healthcare Science in Norfolk
- Elizabeth Fitzpatrick, FRS – Founder, Playback Trust and chief executive officer, Playback Learning Academy, Edinburgh. For services to Children and Young People with Disabilities and to Inclusive Education
- John Richard Farler Fletcher – For services to the Conservation of Shire Horses
- Angela Marie Forbes – Chief Executive, BuildForce. For services to the Construction Industry
- Lesley Mary Forbes – Lately Head, Corporate Management Unit, Social Security Programme Division, Scottish Government. For services to the Establishment of the Social Security System in Scotland
- Cheryl Foster – Referee, Football Association of Wales. For services to Association Football and to Women's Sport
- Mark Richard Foulkes – Oncology Nurse, Royal Berkshire NHS Foundation Trust. For services to Nursing
- Hilton Ivan Freund – Chief Executive, Twinning Project. For services to Reducing Reoffending and to Charity
- Graham Ronald Fulford – Founder, Graham Fulford Charitable Trust. For services to Prostate Cancer Awareness and Earlier Diagnosis
- Stephen Gallacher – For services to Golf
- Paula Garfield – Founder, Deafinitely Theatre. For services to Drama and to the Deaf Community
- Gloria Anne Marie Garman – Head of Service, City of London Corporation Adult Skills, Education and Apprenticeship Service. For services to Adult Education
- Michael John Garvey – For services to Business in Buckinghamshire
- Jamila Elizabeth Gavin – Writer. For services to Children's Literature
- Warren Barry Ginsberg – chair, HiB Ltd. For services to the Home Improvement and Bathroom Industries
- Isaac Ginsbury – Chief Executive, Jewel Foundation. For services to the community in Greater Manchester and to Faith and Integration
- Janet Goldsbrough-Jones – For services to the community in Worthing, West Sussex
- Professor Adam Lee Gordon – Professor of Care for Older People, University of Nottingham and President, British Geriatrics Society. For services to Older People's Healthcare
- Professor Anthony Christopher Gordon, FMedSci – chair, Anaesthesia and Critical Care, Imperial College London. For services to Critical Care Medicine
- Caroline Gould – Founder, Vale Wildlife Hospital. For services to Wildlife Rehabilitation
- Helen Rebecca Gould – Founder, LPM Dance Company. For charitable services to People with Parkinson's
- Steven David Gould – Council Member, General Chiropractic Council. For services to Consumers
- Ian James Gourlay – For voluntary service to the community in Aberdeenshire
- Doreen Graham – Lately Board Member and Trustee, Edinburgh Dog and Cat Home. For services to Animal Welfare
- Vanessa Graham – Head, Commercial Development, Labour Party. For Political and Public Service
- Susan Grant – Founder, The Body Doctor. For services to Entrepreneurship
- Anne Margaret Gregg – Macmillan Nurse, NHS Orkney. For services to Healthcare in the Orkney Islands
- Patricia Alice Jane Gregory – Founding Member, Women's Football Association. For services to National and International Association Football and to Charity
- Robert William Frank Griffin – Founder and Chief Executive, Tomcat UK. For services to Engineering Innovation and to People with Disabilities
- Professor Paul David Griffiths – Emeritus Professor of Virology, University College London. For services to Virology
- Christine Ann Grosskopf – Lately Programme Manager for Refugee Resettlement Scheme, Kent County Council. For services to Refugee Resettlement
- Dr Robert Ian Grundy – Lately Chair, Matrix. For services to Science, Technology and Innovation Policy
- Dr Shobna Gulati, DL – Actor, Writer and Dancer. For services to the Cultural Industries
- Lucy-Marie Elizabeth Hagues – chief executive officer, Capital One UK. For services to Education and Skills
- Raymond Noel Hall – For services to Pipe Bands and to the community in Northern Ireland
- Anne Hamilton – Headteacher, Evelina Hospital School, London Borough of Southwark. For services to Education
- Mary Scott Hamilton – For services to Local Government, to Education and to Cross-Community Reconciliation in Northern Ireland
- Melanie Hampton – chair, Carlton Political Committee. For Political Service
- David André Happy – Managing Director, Telint. For services to Telecommunications and to Technology
- Anne-Marie Hardy – Officer, National Crime Agency. For services to Law Enforcement
- Catherine Ellen Harper – For services to Domestic Abuse Support in Northern Ireland
- Anne Elizabeth Harris – Lately Director of Care, Rainbow Trust. For services to Seriously Ill Children and their Families
- Denise Harrison – Head, Health and Safety, First Bus. For services to the Bus Industry
- Georgina Harrison – chair, Cross-Party Members' and Peers' Staff Association. For services to Parliament
- Stephen Joseph Harrison – Lately Principal, Gilnahirk Primary School, Belfast. For services to Education in Northern Ireland
- Mary Hart – Headteacher, Margaret McMillan Nursery School and Children's Centre, London Borough of Islington. For services to Education
- Jennifer Sarah Hartley – Director, Invest Newcastle and Head of Economic Development, Newcastle City Council. For services to Business and Trade
- Karen Harvey – Founder, Toiletries Amnesty. For services to People Living in Hygiene Poverty, to Considerate Consumption and to the Environment
- Paul Alexander Harvey – Immigration Officer, Home Office. For services to the Home Office Veterans Network
- Jillian Lorna Hastings ward – chair, Participant Panel, Genomics England. For services to Patients and Participants in UK Genomics
- Caroline Peta Hay – Police Inspector, City of London Police. For services to Policing
- Angus Gordon Heddle – For services to the Royal National Lifeboat Institution and to the community in Longhope, Orkney
- Alicia Nicole Hempleman-adams – Explorer. For services to Hot Air Ballooning
- Frederick Higham – Volunteer, Angling Environmental Groups. For services to Protecting and Improving the Ribble Catchment
- Lisa Mari Hilder – Co-founder, Preston Road Women's Centre, Hull. For services to Social Investment and to Charity
- Professor Rowena Hill – National Collaborative Lead, COVID-19 Foresight Group. For Public Service
- Dr Emma Logan Hindley – Bill Manager, Online Safety Bill, Department for Science, Innovation and Technology. For services to Online Safety
- William Hiron – Managing Director, Stephensons of Essex. For services to Passenger Transport
- Andrew Hodkinson – Headteacher, West Oaks School, Leeds. For services to Children and Young People with SEND
- Debra Ann Holloway – Lately Gynaecology Nurse Consultant, Guys' and St Thomas' NHS Foundation Trust. For services to Women's Health
- Mark Timothy Hopton – For services to Education, to Healthcare and to Charities in the West Midlands
- Sarah Hosking – For services to Literature and to the Arts
- Philip Howse – Principal Doorkeeper, House of Commons. For services to Parliament
- James Stanley Mackey Huey – For services to Education and to Rugby in Northern Ireland
- Elaine Hunniford – For services to Young People and to Safeguarding in Sport
- Stephen Hunt – Lately Grants Legacy Manager, Forest Services. For services to Forestry
- Nicola Jane Iles – Head, Special Projects and Deputy Clerk, Privy Council. For services to the Accession Council
- Kenny Imafidon – Co-founder, ClearView Research. For services to the Social and Market Research Professions
- James Noel Irwin – President, Dungannon and Moy Branch, Royal British Legion. For voluntary service to Veterans in Northern Ireland
- Dean Nathan Jackson – Managing Director, HUUB Ltd. For services to Business and to Innovation
- Suzanne Jackson – Domestic Abuse Risk Assessor Manager and Force Lead for Honour Based Abuse, South Yorkshire Police. For services to the Prevention of Violence Against Women and Girls
- Dr Godfrey David Jacobs – Associate Member, Transport Research Laboratory. For services to Road Safety
- Syed Nasir Jaffri – For services to Integration in Glasgow
- Susan Margaret James – Contact Centre Administration Officer, HM Courts and Tribunal Service. For Public and Voluntary Service
- Professor Barbara Elizabeth Jane Jemphrey – Director, Institute of Professional Legal Studies, Queen's University Belfast. For services to Education
- Laura Jeuda – Lately Councillor, Cheshire East Council. For services to Local Government
- Janice Jinks – Foster Carer and chair, Doncaster Foster Carers Association. For services to Supporting Families
- Professor Shane Douglas Johnson – Professor of Future Crime and Director, Dawes Centre for Future Crime, University College London. For Public Service
- David James Johnston – Community Outreach Officer, Northern Ireland Office. For Public and Community Service in Northern Ireland
- David Geoffrey Jones – For services to the community in Morland, Cumbria
- Professor David Simon Jones, FREng – Professor, Pharmaceutical and Biomaterial Engineering and lately Pro-Vice-Chancellor, Queen's University Belfast. For services to Education and to Pharmacy
- Mark Adrian Jones – chief executive officer, Gower College Swansea. For services to Education
- Morgan Lewis Jones – Lately Chair, St Christopher's Hospice. For services to People Living with a Terminal Illness and their Families
- Susan Ann Jones – Lately Operations Manager, Legal Aid Agency. For services to the Civil Justice System
- Simon Roger Kearey – For services to the community in High Wycombe, Buckinghamshire.
- Louise Kelley – Holiday and Food Insecurity Lead, Plymouth Council, Devon. For services to Health and Wellbeing
- Elizabeth Anne Kenny – English Hub Lead, Whiston Worrygoose Junior and Infant Primary School, Rotherham, South Yorkshire. For services to Education
- John Bradley Kent – For services to Business and to Philanthropy
- Dr Samina Khan – Director, Undergraduate Admissions and Outreach, University of Oxford. For services to Higher Education
- Kevin Joseph Kiely – chief executive officer, Medilink UK. For services to the Life Sciences Sector
- Emily Jessica King – Assistant Director (Communities), West Sussex County Council. For services to Refugee Resettlement
- Gillian Kiy – Lately Building Safety Legislation Lead, Department for Levelling Up, Housing and Communities. For services to Building Safety
- Professor Tanya Krzywinska – For services to Higher Education and to the Video Games Industry
- Rakesh Kumar – Clinical Specialist Physiotherapist, Hergest Unit at Ysbyty Gwynedd. For services to the Black, Asian and Minority Ethnic Communities
- Fedir Kurlak – chief executive officer, Association of Ukrainians in Great Britain. For services to the Ukrainian Community in the UK
- Simon John Charles Le Bon – Musician and Songwriter. For services to Music and to Charity
- Jonathan Legh-smith – Executive Director, UKQuantum. For services to Science and Technology
- Sarah Le-good – Head, Foundation Studies and Learner Support, Riverside College, Widnes. For services to Further Education and SEND
- Paul Leonard – Crime Services Office Manager, South Yorkshire Police. For services to Policing
- Sarah Jane Leonard – chair, The Association of English Singers and Speakers. For services to Music
- Professor Nicholas Julian Levell – Consultant Dermatologist, Norfolk and Norwich University Hospitals NHS Foundation Trust. For services to the Care of People with Skin Disease
- Josephine Susan Lewis – Headteacher, Riverside School, London Borough of Southwark. For services to Education
- Dr Philip Edward Charles Lewis – Lately President, Mouth Cancer Foundation. For services to the Detection of Oral Cancer
- Dr Ian Llewellyn – Head, Technical Energy Specialists, Department for Energy Security and Net Zero. For services to Net Zero Innovation
- Professor David Lloyd – For services to Microbiology
- John Morgan Lloyd-jones – For voluntary and charitable services in Wales
- Clyde Loakes – Councillor and Deputy Leader, London Borough of Waltham Forest Council. For services to Local Government
- Dr Gerald Edward Lobley – For services to Chess in Scotland
- Andrew James Lockett – Treasurer, The South Atlantic Medal Association. For voluntary services to Veterans
- Steve Lockhart – Team Leader, Ministry of Defence. For services to Defence
- Andrew Logan – Sculptor, Jeweller and Performance Artist. For services to the Arts
- Sharon Lomas – chief executive officer, The Royal Theatrical Fund. For services to the Performing Arts
- Cecil Lynn Lucas – Co-founder, Chris Lucas Trust. For services to Charitable Fundraising
- Lynn Lucas – Co-founder, Chris Lucas Trust. For services to Charitable Fundraising
- Nigel Patrick Lund – Lately North West Prevent Coordinator, Department for Education. For services to Education and to Policing
- Rachel Lynch – chief executive officer, The Community Network CIC and Founder, The Urban Factory. For services to Young People and to Sport in North East England
- Christopher Lynn – Officer, National Crime Agency. For services to Law Enforcement
- Máirtín Pádraig MacGabhann – For services to Organ Donation in Northern Ireland
- Kenneth MacKenzie – Volunteer, Scottish Mountain Rescue. For services to Mountain Rescues and to the community in Galloway
- Samantha Claire MacKintosh – chief executive officer, Norfolk Community Foundation. For services to Business Development and to Charity
- Verity Jean MacKachlan – Trainer, 1st Radlett Guides and Radlett District (Hertfordshire). For services to Young People in Radlett, Hertfordshire
- John Madden, BEM – Principal, Roddensvale School, Larne. For services to Education and to Children with Special Educational Needs
- Tariq Mahmood – Founder, Feed the Needy and vice-chair, Havering Inter Faith Forum. For services to Charity and to Interfaith Relations
- Joy Maria Lisa Maitland – Managing Director, Inemmo. For services to Business and to Charity
- Lakhbir Singh Mann – Founder, Gaysians. For services to Charity, Integration and to LGBTQ+ Communities
- Josephine Suzanne Marchant – Head of Estates, The Boxing Academy, London Borough of Hackney. For services to Education
- Amy Victoria Rose Marren – Solicitor Apprentice, BPP Holdings Ltd, Essex. For services to Further Education and Apprenticeships
- Elizabeth Janet Martin – chair, Rio Community Centre, Newport-on-Tay. For services to the community in Newport-on-Tay, Fife
- Ian Martin – For services to Sport and to Charity
- John James Martin – For services to Agriculture and Dairy Farming in Northern Ireland
- Sheila Ann Mason – For services to the Textile Industry and to Heritage
- Shiraz Master – Founder and managing director, Simply Doughnuts. For services to the Promotion of Food and Drink, to Business and to Philanthropy
- Anthony Adrian Matthews – Volunteer, The National Memorial Arboretum and Branch Chair, Royal British Legion. For voluntary services to Veterans
- The Very Reverend Mykola Matwijiwskyj – Vicar General, Ukrainian Catholic Eparchy of the Holy Family of London. For services to Refugee Resettlement
- Tristram Thomas Burke Mayhew – Member, National Citizens Service Trust Board and co-founder, Go Ape. For services to Young People and to Youth Empowerment
- Francis Bernard McArdle – Lately Chief Executive, South Derbyshire District Council. For services to Local Government
- Dr Patricia Marion McCaffrey – Consultant Geriatrician, Southern Health and Social Care Trust. For services to Older People in Northern Ireland
- Brian McCann – Panel Practice Adviser, Aberdeenshire Children's Hearing System. For services to Children and to the Children's Hearing System in Scotland
- Diane McCarthy – Inclusion and Diversity Learning Lead, British Transport Police. For services to Policing
- David Adrian McConville – Biomedical Services Manager, The State Pathologist's Department. For services to the Criminal Justice System in Northern Ireland
- Sally McInnes – Head, Unique Content and Collections Care, National Library of Wales. For services to Documentary History
- George Samuel McMath – Lately Deputy Principal, Northern Ireland Statistics and Research Agency, Northern Ireland Civil Service. For services to the Northern Ireland Census
- Gordon Antony McNamee ("Gordon Mac") – Founder, Kiss FM and Mi-Soul Radio. For services to Music
- David McNulty – Head Coach, British Swimming Performance Centre. For services to Swimming
- Geoffrey Mellor – chief executive officer, Coal Pension Trustees. For services to British Coal Pensioners
- Dr William Merrill – Officer, National Crime Agency. For services to Law Enforcement
- Paul William Metcalf – President, Norfolk Beekeepers' Association. For services to Beekeeping
- Susan Jennifer Rawle Middleton – His Majesty's Verderer, The Forest of Dean. For services to Forestry
- Dr Laura Agnes Milby – Lately Lanarkshire Clinical Director, General Dental Services. For services to Dentistry
- Dr Timothy William Mills – Executive Director, STEP Academy Trust, Thornton Heath, London Borough of Croydon. For services to Education
- David Roger Milner-scudder, JP – Magistrate, Lincolnshire Bench. For services to the Administration of Justice
- Colin Malcolm Mitchell – For services to the community in Dumfries and Galloway
- Peter Brian Mizen – Chief Coastguard, Maritime and Coastguard Agency. For services to Maritime Safety
- Victoria Jayne Moorby – Head, Marketing, Oxley Group. For services to the Defence and Aerospace Industry
- Reuben John Moore – Executive Director of Programmes, National Institute of Teaching. For services to Education
- Richard Alexander Glenn Moore – For services to Equine Assisted Therapy and Learning in Northern Ireland
- Katherine Joanna Lloyd Morris – Lately Head, Regulatory Policy, Department for Science, Innovation and Technology. For services to Online Safety
- Dennis Moss – For services to the Welsh Ambulance Service and to First Aid Abroad
- Jeremy Michael Edward Moss – chairman, Association Finance Board. For Political Service
- Tanya Jeneme Motie – For services to Inclusivity and Diversity in Broadcasting
- Kenneth Robert Muir – For services to the Beatson West of Scotland Cancer Centre
- Stephen William John Mulligan – Principal, Mossley Primary School, Newtownabbey, County Antrim. For services to Education
- Glenn McIntosh Munro – Founder, Moray Concert Brass. For services to Music
- Paul Martin Murphy – Area Manager, Merseyside Fire and Rescue Service. For services to the Citizens of Ukraine
- John Richmond Grey Murray – For services to Philanthropy and Volunteering in the Arts and Culture Sectors
- Margaret June Murray – Lately Principal, Sense College, Loughborough. For services to People with Special Educational Needs and Disabilities
- Virginia Gwendoline Murray – For services to Philanthropy and Volunteering in the Arts and Culture Sectors
- Furqan Naeem – Founding Organiser, Greater Manchester Citizens. For services to Interfaith Relations and to the community in Greater Manchester
- Linzi Melanie Neal – Community Development Officer, RAF Odiham. For services to RAF Personnel and their Families
- Doris Anita Neil – For services to Athletics
- Richard Guy Nettleton – Lately Principal Plant Health and Seeds Inspector, Animal and Plant Health Agency and Department for Environment, Food and Rural Affairs. For services to Plant Health
- The Reverend Charles John Nevin – Trustee, The Laurus Trust, Cheadle, Cheshire. For services to Education
- Desmond Carson Nevin – Executive Director, Customer and Operations, Northern Ireland Water. For Public Service
- Duncan Edward Nicholls – Lately Aviation Safety Legislation Lead, Department for Transport. For services to Aviation Safety and Transport
- Susan Ann Nicholls – Lately Chief Executive Officer, Citizens Advice Staffordshire South-West. For services to the community in Staffordshire
- Frances Nicholson – Lately Professional Social Worker, Department of Health Northern Ireland. For services to Social Work and to Adoption and Fostering Services
- Marian Jill Nicholson – Director, Herpes Viruses Association. For services to People Diagnosed with Herpes and Shingles
- Samantha Jane Nicolson – Chief Operating Officer, Royal Navy and Royal Marines Charity. For services to Naval Personnel, Veterans and their Families
- Nicola Ann Norville – Speech and Language Therapist, Defence Medical Rehabilitation Centre. For services to Armed Forces Personnel
- Gary William O'hare – Lately Chief Nurse, Cumbria, Northumberland, Tyne and Wear NHS Foundation Trust. For services to Mental Health and Disabilities in the NHS
- Lisa Margaret O'keefe – Executive Director, Insight, Sport England. For services to Sport
- Nigel James Oatway – Access Manager, DB Cargo (UK) Ltd. For services to Transport
- Richard Ogden – Chief Fire Officer, Cumbria Fire and Rescue Service and chief executive officer and co-founder, Boxwise Charity Foundation. For services to the community in Cumbria and to Young People in the UK and Abroad
- Professor Chloe Meave Orkin – Consultant Physician, The Royal London Hospital and Clinical Professor of Infection and Inequities, Queen Mary University of London. For services to the NHS
- Richard Douglas Osborne – Coach, Sitting Volleyball. For services to Disability Sport
- Nick Owen – For services to Broadcasting and to Charity
- Wing Commander Timothy Owen – Fundraiser, 3 Dads Walking for Papyrus UK. For services to the Prevention of Young Suicide
- Michael Richard Palmer – Fundraiser, 3 Dads Walking for Papyrus UK. For services to the Prevention of Young Suicide
- Nevita Pandya – Headteacher, Townley Grammar School, Bexleyheath, London Borough of Bexley. For services to Education
- Dr Jasmin Paris – Ultra Runner. For services to Fell and Long-Distance Running
- Antoinette Alice Parr – General Manager, NHS Greater Glasgow and Clyde. For services to NHS Scotland, to the Scout Movement and to St Augustine's Roman Catholic Church, Coatbridge and the Motherwell Diocese
- Pradip Patel – Lately Chair, Frimley Health NHS Foundation Trust. For services to the NHS
- Robert Charles Mercer Peal – Member, Cultural Education Plan Expert Advisory Panel. For services to Education
- John David Pearce – Council Member, The Football Association. For services to Association Football
- Elizabeth Rebecca Pemberton-Mitchell – Singer. For services to Music and to Charity
- Leonie Ann Phillips – Wales Manager, Money and Pensions Service. For services to Financial Capability and Financial Education
- Charlotte Elizabeth Pike – Food Writer, Cookery Teacher and Chef. For services to Food Writing and to Food Education
- Hassan Christopher Pillai – Volunteer. For services to Fundraising and to Cancer Support
- Kenneth Edward Poole – Head, Economic Development, Cardiff Council. For services to Economic and Community Development in Cardiff
- Clare Pooley – Chief of Staff, House of Commons. For services to Parliament
- Elizabeth Porterfield – chair and board member, Genetic Alliance UK, and Vice Chair and Trustee, Sight Scotland and Sight Scotland Veterans. For services to People with Rare Diseases
- Christopher George Robin Powell – Football Coach and lately Professional Player. For services to Association Football
- Nicholas John Powell – Lately Border Force Higher Officer, Home Office. For services to Border Security
- Nicholas William Niel Price, DL – For services to the Food and Hospitality Industry and to the community in Northern Ireland
- Philip Edward Pusey – chief executive officer, Staffordshire Council of Voluntary Youth Services. For services to the community in Burton upon Trent and Staffordshire
- Catherine Maria Quinn – Principal, Abbey Community College, Newtownabbey, County Antrim. For services to Education.
- Raymond Patrick Rafferty – chair, Trade Unions, Belfast Health and Social Care Trust. For services to Health and Social Care in Northern Ireland
- Dr Imran Rafi – General Practitioner and Reader in Primary Care and Genomics, St George's, University of London. For services to General Practice and Genomics
- Sarah Randall-paley – Director of Finance, University of Lancaster. For services to Higher Education
- Dr Adam David Read – Trustee, Chartered Institution of Wastes Management. For services to Waste and Resources Management
- Rebecca Katharine Redfern – Swimmer. For services to Young People and to the community in Worcestershire
- Jenefer Jane Rees – Acting Assistant Director, Quality, Safeguarding and Workforce (Adults), and lately Principal Social Worker and Service Director, London Borough of Islington. For services to Social Work
- Rosemary Rees – Head, Engagement and Skills, Midland Metro Alliance and lately Member, West Midlands Women in Rail Steering Committee. For services to Diversity and Inclusion in the Rail Industry
- Stephanie Madeleine Jacqueline Rhodes – Chief Operating Officer, Tree Planting Programme, Forest Services. For services to Forestry
- Rosalind Jean Richardson – Counsellor, House of Lords. For services to Parliament
- Stanley Keith Ridley – National Chair, Royal Naval Association. For voluntary service to Veterans
- Valerie Helen Riley – Volunteer Conservation Warden, Staffordshire Wildlife Trust. For services to Wildlife Conservation
- Laura Ruth Robbins – chair, The Royal Air Force Widows' Association. For voluntary service to RAF Widows
- Kim Pamela Jane Roberts – Chief Executive, HENRY. For services to Childhood Obesity Prevention
- Lindsay Elizabeth Margaret Robinson – For services to Perinatal Mental Health in Northern Ireland
- Susan Robson – For services to Gender Equity, Diversity and Inclusion in Engineering and Energy
- Grant Reginald Dain Rogers – Crown Court Manager, Crown Prosecution Service. For services to Law and Order
- Dr Lucy Elizabeth Rogers, FREng – Freelance Engineer and Author. For services to Engineering
- Dale Christine Rooks – Director, Learning Education and Participation, Chichester Festival Theatre. For services to Theatre and to Young People
- Edwina Victoria Rosenberg – For voluntary services to Young People in Long Term Care and to the community in Bury, Greater Manchester
- Nora Teresa Casares Rundell – Secretary, Inclusive Skating. For services to Inclusive Skating and Charities in Dunfermline
- Sean Edmund Russell – Programme Director, Mental Health and Productivity Pilot. For services to Mental Health
- Derek John Salisbury – chair, Neath Hockey Club. For services to Hockey in South Wales
- Sharon Marlene Salmon – Supplier Manager, Network Rail and lately chair, Cultural Fusion. For services to Diversity and Inclusion
- Francois John Samuel – Lately Head, Building Regulations Policy, Welsh Government. For services to the Construction Industry in Wales
- Maria Sarkar – Co-founder and vice-president of DriveWorks. For services to Manufacturing
- Nicola Ann Secker – Senior Employee Relations Manager, HM Prison and Probation Service. For services to Employee Relations, particularly Employees Living with a Terminal Illness
- David Anthony Seers – Head, Sponsorship and Historic Environment, Scottish Government. For services to Culture, History and the Arts of Scotland
- Martin Edward Segal – For services to Terminal Cancer Patients and Cancer Research
- Dr Amar Shah – Chief Quality Officer, East London Foundation Trust and National Clinical Director for Improvement, NHS England. For services to Healthcare Improvement
- Kiran Jethalal Shah – Stuntman and Scaledouble. For services to the Film Industry
- Bernadette Shiels – For services to the Arts in Northern Ireland
- Sophie Kathleen Simpson – Senior Sales Manager, Freed of London. For services to Dance
- Heather Marguerita Small – For Voluntary and Charitable Services
- Geoffrey Eric Smith – Befriending and Support Team, HM Prison Wandsworth. For services to Foreign National Prisoners
- Pennie Smith – Photographer. For services to Photography
- Peter Dudley Smith – Founder, The Cooke E-Learning Foundation, Leicestershire. For services to Education and to the community in Beaumont Leys, Leicester
- Paul Sonvico – Officer, National Crime Agency. For services to Law Enforcement
- Philip John Speight – Canal Boat Painter. For services to Heritage Crafts
- Diana Mary Speirs – Audio Executive Editor for Books, BBC. For services to Broadcasting and to Literature
- Alexander Steele – Honorary Life Member, The Forty Club. For services to Cricket and to People with Interstitial Lung Disease
- Fiona Kennedy Stobart – Lately Chief Executive Officer, Hospice at Home Carlisle and North Lakeland. For services to Community Palliative Care
- Stuart Ellis Storey – chair, Lea Recreation Society and chair, Wodson Park Trust. For services to Sport and to the community in East Hertfordshire
- Farrah Storr – Magazine Editor. For services to Media and Diversity
- Dean Stott – For services to Sport, and to Humanitarian and Mental Health Awareness
- Irene Strank – For services to Charity and to the community in the London Borough of Merton
- Ashley Summerfield – Lately Chair, People Committee, National Citizens Service Trust. For services to Young People
- Francis John Sutherland (iain sutherland) – Special Constable, Police Service of Scotland. For Public Service
- Corinne Roxanne Tanner – Senior Audit Manager and co-chair, Ethnic Minority Network, National Audit Office. For services to Public Sector Audit
- Hayley Marie Tatum – Senior Vice President, Chief People and Corporate Affairs Officer, Asda. For services to the Voluntary and Charity Sector
- Anna Louise Thomas – Co-founder and Director, Institute for the Future of Work. For services to Research on the Future of Work
- Yourlance Bianca Thomas – Founder, SELFguarding. For services to Education
- Yvette Anesta Thomas – School Improvement Manager, Buckinghamshire County Council. For services to Education.
- Paul Anthony Thompson – Director of Trading, British Red Cross. For services to the British Red Cross
- Peter Gordon Lamoureux Thompson – Lately Wildlife Biodiversity Adviser, Game and Wildlife Conservation Trust. For services to Farmland Ecology and Wildlife Conservation
- Anna Louise Toland – Team Leader, Older People's Primary Care Service, Glasgow City Health and Social Care Partnership. For services to Health and Social Care in Glasgow
- Helen Elizabeth Tonks – Founder and Director, Hydraulics Online Ltd. For services to Business and to Exports
- Professor Robert Paul Tooze, FRSE – Honorary Professor, University of St Andrews. For services to Science and Industry
- Dr Richard David Torbett – Chief Executive, Association of the British Pharmaceutical Industry. For services to Life Sciences and to the Pharmaceutical Industry
- Professor Rachel Anne Upthegrove – Professor of Psychiatry and Youth Mental Health, University of Birmingham and Consultant Psychiatrist, Birmingham Early Intervention Services. For services to Mental Health Research and to Life Sciences
- Sarah Louise Van der merwe – Head, Apprenticeships, The Learning Enterprise, HCRG Care Group, Greater Manchester. For services to Further Education and Skills
- Tanvi Bakul Kumar Vyas – Member, Disabled Persons Transport Advisory Committee. For services to Transport
- James Edward Walker – President, Cumbria Tourism. For services to Tourism
- Alexander Peter Walmsley – Chair of Trustees, The First Federation Trust, Newton Abbot, Devon. For services to Education
- Deborah Ward – Executive Headteacher, WISE Academies, Tyne and Wear. For services to Education
- Pamela Waters – Strategic Lead, Kernow English Hub, Newquay, Cornwall. For services to Education
- Professor Maxwell Sheldrake Watson – For services to Palliative Care Medicine
- Paulette Nicola Watson – For services to Education in Greater London and Abroad
- Eleanor Jane Watts – Area Manager, The Riverside Group. For services to Tackling Homelessness
- Kenneth Howard Wax – Lately President, Society of London Theatre and lately chair, Theatre Development Trust. For services to Charity and to the Arts
- Sheralee Webb – Executive Headteacher, Northgate School Academy Trust, Northampton. For services to Education
- Dr Sara Elizabeth Wells – Director, Mary Lyon Centre, MRC Harwell. For services to Medical Research
- Michelle Weltman – For voluntary and charitable services to Disability Sport and to the LGBTQI Sporting community in London
- Maria Louise White – Parliamentary Counsel. For services to Internet Regulation
- Paul James Whiteley – For services to the community in Plymouth, Devon
- Helen Whittaker – For services to the Creation and Conservation of Stained and Architectural Glass Art
- Elizabeth Mary Whyte – Covid Lead, HC-One. For services to Social Care
- Joey Sebastian Wicks – For services to Young People and to the community in Canterbury, Kent
- Wayne Anthony Wild – chair, Darwen Town Deal, and chair and Trustee, Blackburn and Darwen Youth Zone. For services to Young People and to the community in Darwen, Lancashire
- Patrick William Thomas Wilkins – For services to St. Paul's Cathedral, London
- Andrew Derek Williams – Lately Leader, Dacorum Borough Council. For Public Service
- David Rowlands Williams – Lately Chair, Discovery Schools Academy Trust, Leicestershire. For services to Education
- Lynn Suzanne Williams – Councillor and Leader, Blackpool Council. For services to Local Government
- Michael Charles Williams – Wetland Habitat Restoration Specialist, Environment Agency. For services to Conservation and to Natural Flood Management
- Harold Wilson – Owner and Group Chair, UK Docks Marine Services. For services to the Marine Engineering Industry
- Ian Stuart Wilson – chair, The Howard Partnership Trust, Surrey. For services to Education
- Robert Hugh Marshall Wilson – Lately Regional Officer for Northern Ireland, Association of School and College Leaders. For services to Education
- Rosalyn Susan Wilton – deputy chair, Board of Trustees and chair, Finance Committee, University of London. For services to Education and Skills
- Andrea Clare Wood – Principal, New Directions College, Berkshire. For services to Further Education
- Diane Wood – For voluntary and charitable services in Scotland
- James Woodall – Co-founder, George and the Giant Pledge. For services to Cancer Care and Cancer Research for Children
- Victoria Woodall – Co-founder, George and the Giant Pledge. For services to Cancer Care and Cancer Research for Children
- Jacqueline Forrest Wright – Lately Chair, Lochielnet. For services to the Business Community of Lochaber
- Nicola Wynne – Director of Development, St Paul's Cathedral. For services to Heritage and to Charity, particularly the Remember Me Project
- William Joseph Young – Project Manager, South West College, County Tyrone. For services to Civil Engineering Education
- Professor Callum Cormack Youngson – Emeritus Professor and lately Associate Pro-Vice Chancellor for Education, Faculty of Health and Life Sciences, University of Liverpool. For services to Dental Education

Overseas and International

- Steven Carr, Founder, Dnipro Kids. For services to Children in Ukraine and support to the Ukrainian Community in Scotland.
- Anna Elizabeth Cavell, Owner, Fire Tree Hotel, Juba, South Sudan; Chair, The South Sudan British Business Association. For services to Victims of Conflict-Related Sexual Violence in South Sudan.
- Jacqueline Angela Comyn, Co-founder, Bushbells. For services to Education in Kenya.
- Mary Philomena Devereaux (Maureen Devereaux), Co-Founder, Trustee and Patron, The Sean Devereux Children’s Fund. For services to Education and Humanitarian support to Children in Africa.
- Susan Harriet Doak, Midwife, Cayman Islands. For services to Healthcare in the Cayman Islands.
- Angela Trudie Farrugia, Founder and Group Managing Director, Brand X Society. For services to Business and Licensing.
- Donatella Fitzgerald, English Language Learning Consultant – Supervisor General Sales Management, Pearson, Italy. For services to English Education and Youth Engagement in Italy.
- Peter James Fleming, Co-founder, Kick4Life. For services to Sport for Social Change in Lesotho.
- Stephen John Fleming, Co-founder, Kick4Life. For services to Sport for Social Change in Lesotho.
- Monique Antoinette Foulcer, lately Management Counsellor, British Embassy Paris, France. For services to British Foreign Policy.
- Elizabeth Alexievna Furber, Co-founder and Financial Director, Ripple Africa. For services to Education, to Health and to the Environment in Malawi.
- Geoffrey Furber, Co-founder and Chief Executive Officer, Ripple Africa. For services to Education, to Health and to the Environment in Malawi.
- Dr. Shirley Patricia Heywood, Gynaecologist, International Nepal Fellowship. For services to Women’s Health in Nepal.
- Margaret Esther Jarrett, Founder, Overseas Aid for the Kids of Sierra Leone. For services to Children’s Education in Sierra Leone.
- Nitin Kapoor, Vice President – BioPharmaceuticals International and Chairman, AstraZeneca Vietnam. For services to Healthcare and UK/ Vietnam relations.
- Valerie Judith Barton Knight, Vice Consul, British High Commission Nairobi, Kenya. For services to British Nationals in Kenya.
- Shaun James Lewis, Team Leader, Foreign, Commonwealth and Development Office. For services to National Security.
- Peter Macfarlane, Theatre and Opera Director, Argentina. For services to British Theatre and the British Community in Argentina.
- Susan Machin, Founder, Jarjeer Mules and Donkey Refuge, Marrakesh, Morocco. For services to Equine Welfare in Morocco.
- Nicholas James Magnus, Head, Dulwich College (Singapore). For services to British Education and British Communities Overseas.
- John Alexander Carruthers McGurk, Founder, Sportler 4 a Childrens World, Germany. For services to Fundraising for Disadvantaged Children.
- Charlotte Lucy Meyer, Team Leader, Foreign, Commonwealth and Development Office. For services to National Security.
- Simone Jeannette Paissoni, Honorary British Consul, Nice, France. For services to British Nationals in France.
- Sandra Lynette Pearce, lately Desk Officer, Foreign, Commonwealth and Development Office. For services to British Foreign Policy.
- Lady (Jadranka) Beresford-Peirse, Founder and Trustee, The International Trust for Croatian Monuments. For services to UK/Croatia relations, to Philanthropy and to the Protection of Cultural Heritage in Croatia.
- Ian Christopher Stein-Rosinski Ramshaw, General Manager, British Chamber of Commerce, Venezuela. For services to British Commercial Interests in Venezuela.
- Margaret Mary Sacarello, Founder, Research Into Childhood Cancer, Gibraltar. For services to Charity in Gibraltar.
- Harcharan Lal Sehmar, Co-founder and Director, The Village International Education Centre, Bangkok, Thailand. For services to Special Needs Education in Thailand.
- Charles John Shackleton, Founder, Aid to Eastern Europe. For services to Fundraising and the Provision of Humanitarian Aid and Medical Equipment to Eastern Europe.
- The Reverend Frances Maureen Takis, Deacon, Eswatini. For services to the Community in Eswatini.
- David Wallwork, Founder, The David School, Mile 36, Sierra Leone and Trustee, The David School Trust. For services to Education in Sierra Leone.
- Richard Stuart Warburton, Former President and Board Member, British Chamber of Commerce Singapore. For services to British Commercial Interests and to the British Community in Singapore.
- Bridget Aileen Withell, Trustee, Uganda Concern UK, supporting Uganda Woman Concern Ministry, Uganda. For services to Communities and Women in Uganda.
- Roy Jonathan Yates, President, British American Chamber of Commerce, Broward and Palm Beach Counties, United States of America. For services to British Businesses in Broward and Palm Beach Counties in the United States of America.

=== British Empire Medal (BEM) ===
British Empire Medal ribbon

- Nathan John Talamacus Abbott – Fundraiser. For services to Charity and to Cleft Lip and Palate Awareness
- Brian Francis Adams – For services to Young People and Sport
- Rebecca Allen – Secretary, Scottish Council, Royal National Lifeboat Institution, Committee Member, Aberdeen and District Lifeboat Fundraising Branch, and Lifeboat Administration Officer, Aberdeen Lifeboat Station, Royal National Lifeboat Institution. For voluntary services to the Royal National Lifeboat Institution
- Teresa Aristodemou – Founder, Aspect Living Foundation. For services to Older People in Suffolk
- David Garfield Arseneault – For services to the community in Worthing, West Sussex
- Claire Frances Ashby – For services to the community in Rotherham, South Yorkshire
- Robert Lindsay Salmond Ashworth – Civilian Investigator, Greater Manchester Police. For Public Service
- George Kenneth Atkinson – Campaigner. For services to Road Safety
- Simon James Bacon – For public service in Surrey and West Sussex
- Bernadette Marion Banneville – Lately Correspondence Officer, Prime Minister's Office. For Public Service
- Bernadette Barnes – Manager, Home-Start Northampton, Northamptonshire. For services to Families and to Early Years Learning
- Ellen Laura Barnett – Volunteer, St Saviour's Church, Craigavon. For services to Music and to the community in Craigavon
- Christine Bell – chief executive officer and Founder, Cycling Without Age Scotland. For services to the community in Falkirk and to Older People in Scotland
- Yvonne Bell – Public Protection Unit Officer, Home Office. For services to Safeguarding
- Myrna Miriam Bernard – Social Worker, Association of Jewish Refugees. For services to the Jewish Community and to the Disabled in Scotland
- Peter John Best – For services to Steam and Heritage Railways
- Shirley Diane Biro – For services to the community in the London Borough of Newham
- Richard Collins Black – For services to the Royal British Legion in County Tyrone
- Joseph Albert Blackburn – For services to the community in Birmingham, West Midlands
- Alan Gordon Blake – For services to the community in Hereford, Herefordshire
- Bobbette Gayona Blake – Residential Care Manager, Royal Hospital Chelsea. For services to Veterans
- Peter Graham Blount – For services to the community in Wymeswold, Leicestershire
- Roman Leslie Bodnarec – Volunteer, Association of Ukrainians in Great Britain. For services to Refugee Resettlement
- Jean Bolton – Volunteer, Chorley's Angels. For services to the community in Lancashire
- Selwyn Delano Boothe – Pastoral Mentor, Gunnersbury Catholic School, London Borough of Hounslow. For services to Education
- Derek Frederick Lawrence Borland – For public service in Northern Ireland
- Olive Margaret Boscott – For services to the community in Cropredy, Oxfordshire
- Jillian Boundy – Police Staff, Metropolitan Police Service. For services to Safeguarding Children and to Policing
- Sally Margaret Bourton – Postmistress. For services to the community in Trewoon, Cornwall
- Stephen Thomas Bousfield – Heritage and Ceremonial Services Coordinator and Fire Cadet Instructor, Merseyside Fire and Rescue Service. For services to the community in Merseyside
- Sharna Marie Bowman – For services to Young People's Mental Health and Wellbeing
- Christopher Boyle – Trade Union Safety Representative, BAE Systems. For services to Defence
- Dr Mary Frances Bradshaw – Careers Adviser, Newcastle and Stafford Colleges Group, Staffordshire. For services to Further Education
- Hazel Jean Britton – For services to the community in the Isle of Wight, particularly during COVID-19
- Harry Cowie Brodie – Organiser, Wheelchair Curling Committee Scotland. For services to Wheelchair Curling
- Valerie Elaine Bryant – Manager and Trustee, Knutsford Heritage Centre. For services to Heritage and to the community in Knutsford, Cheshire
- Janice Margaret Buckle – For services to Biggleswade Junior Badminton Club, Bedfordshire
- David John Burgess – For services to Junior Association Football in Peterborough
- Hazel Burgess – For services to Junior Association Football in Peterborough
- Sue Burton – Founder, Remus Memorial Horse Sanctuary. For services to Equine Welfare
- Carole Elizabeth Bush – For services to the community in Wiltshire
- Philip George Buss – For services to the community in Bethersden, Kent
- Shamza Butt – Member, National Citizens Service Trust Youth Voice Forum. For services to Young People
- John Caldwell – For voluntary services to the community in Donaghadee, County Down
- Joan Elizabeth Cameron – Samaritans Volunteer. For services to the Samaritans
- Joseph Gordon Cameron – For services to Cultural Heritage in Scotland and to Charity
- Professor Donald Murray Campbell – Professor, Musical Acoustics, Edinburgh University. For services to the Carlops Church and to the community in Tweeddale and Edinburgh
- Violet Rebecca Chambers – Social Worker, Barnardo's, Liverpool, Merseyside. For services to Children's Social Care
- Eric John Champion – For services to the Riverside Arts Centre and to Culture in Spelthorne, Surrey
- Sellathurai Chandrakumar – Postmaster. For services to the community in Notting Hill, Royal Borough of Kensington and Chelsea
- Ann Charlton – For services to the community in Kingsway, Chester
- Emma Louise Chester – Brownie and Guide Leader, and Division Commissioner, Girlguiding UK. For services to Young People
- Robert David Chew – Firefighter, Greater Manchester Fire and Rescue Service. For services to the community in Littleborough, Greater Manchester
- Sheila Ann Cholwill – For services to Charity and to the community in Bridgerule, Devon
- The Reverend Claire Clarke – Reverend, Hope Church, Hounslow. For services to the community in the London Borough of Hounslow
- Jessie Hilda Clarke – Volunteer Fundraiser and Local Ambassador, Cancer Research UK. For voluntary service in Nottinghamshire
- Christina Emily Clunes – chair, Catherine Street Community Centre, Aberdeen. For services to the community in Aberdeen
- Elizabeth Ann Coleman – For voluntary and charitable services to the community in Belfast and Missionary Work in Africa
- Hazel Patricia Collett – Meetings Secretary, British Astronomical Association. For services to Astronomy
- James MacAra Comrie – Scout Leader, 5th Perthshire (Crieff) Scout Group. For services to Scouting and to the community in Crieff, Perth and Kinross
- Gayle Rosalyn Connors – For services to Radio Broadcasting
- Catherine Susan Coombs – President, Junior Coach, Manager and Child Welfare Officer, Redland Ladies Hockey Club. For services to Hockey in Bristol
- Danielle Cooper – Lately Youth Engagement Worker, Everton Free School, Liverpool, Merseyside. For services to Vulnerable Children and Young People
- Sarah Jane Corbridge – For services to the community in Helston, Cornwall
- Thomas Coulthard – For services to Heritage and to the community in the Lake District, Cumbria
- Sigill Seigfroyed Cragwell – Station Assistant, Thameslink Railway. For Public Service
- Hannah Crane – Lately Cardiac Physiologist, Barts Health NHS Trust and Volunteer. For services to the NHS
- Thomas James Culley – Co-Vice Chair, Apprenticeship Ambassador Network. For services to Apprenticeships and Skills
- Geppino Paolo Dammone – Director, Salvo's Restaurant, Leeds. For services to Hospitality
- Gianfranco Demetrio Dammone – Managing Director, Salvo's Restaurant, Leeds. For services to Hospitality
- John Davidson – For services to the Licensed Retail Sector
- Carys Eluned Davies – Senior Midwife, Hywel Dda University Health Board. For services to Midwifery
- Dawn Marie Davies – Co-founder, Reach Tyn Cae Camping Weekend. For services to Children, Young People and their Families
- Kristy Louise Davies – Director, South Wales Valleys Samaritans. For services to the Samaritans
- Patricia Anne Davies – For services to the community in Worthing, West Sussex
- Robert Davies – Co-founder, Reach Tyn Cae Camping Weekend. For services to Children, Young People and their Families
- Robert Vincent Davies – For services to the community in Bridgnorth, Shropshire
- Cynthia Dawkins-lloyd – For services to People from Ethnic Minority Backgrounds in East London
- Christian Anthony Howard Dixon – Chief Executive, The Arts of Change. For services to Mental Health in Dudley and the Black Country
- Pamela Jean Doel (sam doel) – Volunteer, NSPCC. For services to Charity and to Young People
- Kevin John Dolan – Senior Supervisor, Forest Service, Department of Agriculture, Environment and Rural Affairs, Northern Ireland Civil Service. For services to Forestry
- Margaret Mary Donaldson – Organist, Wardie Parish Church, Edinburgh. For services to the community in Edinburgh
- Alan Donegan – Founder, Rebel Finance School. For services to Financial Education
- Katherine Susanna Donegan – Founder, Rebel Finance School. For services to Financial Education
- Stephen Alexander Neil Double – For services to the community in Ryde, Isle of Wight
- Hilary Dowson – For services to the community in Ellastone, Staffordshire
- Ann Doyle – Technical Specialist, Environment Agency. For services to Water Regulation and to the community in Warrington
- Claire Louise Drummond – Head of Student Wellbeing, Ulster University. For services to Higher Education
- Lee Duerden – Philanthropist. For charitable services to the community in Pendle, Lancashire
- Julie Kay Duffy – Vision Impairment Services Officer, Portsmouth Library Service. For services to Public Libraries and to the community in Portsmouth
- Aidan Early – chair and co-founder, Community First Responders Group Armagh and Tyrone. For voluntary service to the community in Northern Ireland
- Robert Norris Easson – Director of Rugby, Edinburgh Academical Football Club. For services to Scottish Rugby
- Laurence Matthew John East – Lately Police Sergeant, Thames Valley Police. For services to Policing and to Charity
- David Easthope – For services to the community in Thriplow, Cambridgeshire
- Brian Lincoln Eastoe – For services to Woodcarving and to Charity
- Steven Paul Edginton – Crew Manager, Oxfordshire County Council Fire and Rescue Service. For services to the community in Oxfordshire
- Edna Margaret Edmond – Voluntary Organist. For services to Skene Parish Church, Aberdeenshire
- Margaret Evelyn Edmond – For voluntary and charitable services, particularly to the Red Cross
- Adele Leona Elder – Area Catering Manager, Education Authority. For services to Education and to Charity in the Causeway Coast and Glens
- Graham Ellis – For services to the community in Preston Bissett, Buckingham, Buckinghamshire
- Andrea Claire Ellison – Lately Chief Librarian, Leeds Libraries. For services to Libraries
- Valerie Mary Etteridge – For services to the community in Otterbourne, Hampshire
- Eileen Mary Evans – For services to the Protection of Cats in Lancashire
- Richard Jeremy Evans – For services to the community in Stansfield, Suffolk
- Olive Louise Fairclough – For services to the community in Northwood, London Borough of Hillingdon
- David Sims Farley – For services to the community in Wadebridge and Lanreath, Cornwall
- Pauline Mary Farman – For services to the community in Cirencester, Gloucestershire
- Ian Farthing – Trustee, St Mark's Church Preschool, Bedford, Bedfordshire. For services to Early Years Learning
- Margaret Anne Faulkner – For services to the community in Ley Hill, Buckinghamshire
- Ernest Feargrieve – Lead Race Mechanic, Great British Cycling Team. For services to Cycling
- Josephine Carol Finnegan – Fundraiser, Marie Curie Charity. For services to Charitable Fundraising and to the community in Harrogate, North Yorkshire
- David William Fleming – For services to the community in Stonehaven, Aberdeenshire
- Dorothy May Ford – For services in the community in Cleveleys, Lancashire
- Linda Mary Forrister – For services to British Gymnastics
- Paul Kevin Francis – Community Development and Safeguarding Manager, Hampshire and Isle of Wight Fire and Rescue Service. For services to Public Safety
- Robert Franks – For services to Young People and to the community in Poole, Dorset
- Robert James French – Scout Leader, 20th Gillingham (Hempstead) Air Scout Troop. For services to Young People in Medway, Kent
- Lilian Gallagher – For services to Charity in North East England
- Giulietta Galli-atkinson – Campaigner. For services to Road Safety
- Michael Paul Gauntlett – For services to Charity and to the community in Pendle, Lancashire
- BeeBee Rashida Giddings – Higher Officer, HM Revenue and Customs. For Public Service
- Brian Alfred John Gilham – For services to Bereaved Families and to the community in the London Borough of Hillingdon
- William Hiram Gillespie – For services to Military and Police Support in Northern Ireland
- Shirley Ellen Goodhew – chair, Chatham Dockyard Historical Society. For services to Heritage and to the community in Kent
- Amanda Susan Goth – Mountain and Hill Runner. For voluntary services to the Todmorden Harriers Running Club and Sport Calderdale
- Antonio Flavio Gracias – For services to the community in the London Borough of Ealing
- Connor James Graham – Ambassador and Peer Mentor, Action Cancer Northern Ireland. For services to People with Skin Cancer
- William Henderson Gray – Managing Director, ARK Estates (Scotland). For services to Charity in the Scottish Highlands
- Sheelagh Elizabeth Greer – For services to Music in Northern Ireland
- Jean Waldrum Grossett – For services to Rachel House and St Andrews House, Fife
- James Melvyn Sands Hamilton – For services to Community Safety and the Neighbourhood Watch
- Emma Alexandra Hammett – Founder, Chief Executive and Principal Partner, First Aid for Life. For services to First Aid Training
- Elizabeth Whiteside Hearton Hannah – Chief of Staff, Director of Environment, City of London Corporation. For charitable services to Hospices and to Child Welfare in the City of London and East London
- David Arthur Harding – Emergency Response Volunteer, Humberside, British Red Cross. For voluntary service to the British Red Cross
- Geoffrey Matthew Haywood – Committee Member, Poole Branch, Royal Marines Association. For voluntary services to Veterans, particularly Veterans of 47 Royal Marine Commando Association
- Irene Catherine Hewitt – For voluntary services in Londonderry
- George Knox Hill – Volunteer Chair, KHL Big Local. For voluntary services to the community in Corby, Northamptonshire
- Carol Olive Hipkin – Founder and Group Chief Instructor, Riding for the Disabled Colchester (Garrison) Group. For services to Young People
- Jeremy William Hollis – For services to the community in Dover, Kent
- James Hope – For services to the community in Barmulloch, Glasgow
- Keith Alan Howard – For services to the community in Caxton, Cambridgeshire
- Arthur William Howick – For services to the community in Gotham, Nottinghamshire
- Katherine Ann Hughes – For Voluntary and Charitable Services
- Marguerite Mary Teresa Hull – For services to the St Vincent De Paul Society and to the community in Eglinton, County Londonderry
- Susan Jane Hunt – Founder, North East Open Studios and Honorary Member, Aberdeen Artists Society. For services to the Arts and Crafts
- Irene Elizabeth Hunter – For services to the Royal British Legion in County Londonderry
- Jill Margaret Hyde – For services to Music in Liverpool, Merseyside
- Norma Hyde – For services to the Special Olympics, Sandwell
- Dr Michael Adair Ievers – For services to Drama in Northern Ireland
- Dr John Black Irving – Treasurer, Mill Cottage Hut, Cairngorms National Park, Treasurer, Glen Brittle Memorial Hut, Skye, and Member and lately chair, Forth Valley Mountaineering Club. For services to Outdoor Activities and Health in Scotland
- Kenneth James Ivory – Honorary Treasurer, North West London Branch, Soldiers', Sailors' and Airmen's Families Association. For services to the Armed Forces Community
- David Jacobson – For services to the community in Surbiton, Royal Borough of Kingston upon Thames
- Dr Jonathan Paul James – Conductor, Teacher and Music Educator. For services to Music
- Barrie Hugh Jenkins – Vice Chair and Head Bowls Coach, Cardiff Chameleons. For services to Bowls in Wales
- Susan Christine Johnson – Cub Scout Leader, 1st Rickmansworth Cub Scouts. For services to Young People in Rickmansworth, Hertfordshire
- Harold Leslie Jones – Fundraiser. For services to Charities related to Motor Neurone Disease and to the community in Sutton Coldfield, West Midlands
- Lynda Denise Jones – Vice President, Woking Branch, British Red Cross. For voluntary service to the British Red Cross
- Patricia Ann Jopling – For services to the community in County Durham
- Anthony Patrick Kelly – For services to Awareness of Diabetes in the UK and Abroad
- Andrew McCartney Kennedy – chair, Board of Governors, Ballykeel Primary School, Ballymena. For voluntary service to Education and to the community in Ballymena, County Antrim
- Glenis Kershaw – For services to the community in Keyworth, Nottinghamshire
- Mandy Elizabeth Kilpatrick – Lately Principal Private Secretary to the Lady Chief Justice. For services to Justice
- William Henry King – For public service in Northern Ireland
- John Ernest Hutcheson Kitson – Member, The National Inclusion Team. For services to Scouting
- Dr Jeffery John Kramer – Co-founder, St Michael's Hospice. For services to Hospice Care in Herefordshire
- Rachel Kundasamy – Community Development Manager, Epsom and Ewell Borough Council. For services to Refugee Resettlement
- Dennis Laird – For services to the community in Barrow-in-Furness, Cumbria
- George Templeton Lawrie – Community Volunteer. For services to Rural Perthshire
- Mervyn Reginald Leggett – Council Member, The Football Association. For services to Association Football
- Janet Rhian Lewis – Founder and Facilitator, Ty-Golau Dementia Charitable Trust. For services to People with Dementia and their Families
- Kathleen Mary Lewis – Volunteer, The Hospice of St Francis. For services to the Hospice Community in Hertfordshire
- Nathan Harvey Liberman – Volunteer, Sheringham Community First Responders. For services to the NHS and to the community in North Norfolk
- The Reverend Canon Stewart Lisk – Honorary Chaplain, Cardiff Council. For services to Community Cohesion and to Charity
- Thomas Long – For services to the community in Wakefield, West Yorkshire
- Erroll Adrian Lutton – For services to Hockey
- Brian Sinclair Lynas – For services to the Boys' Brigade and to the community in County Antrim
- Anne Milligan Lyon – County Archivist, Girlguiding. For services to Girlguiding in South Lanarkshire
- Marie Lyon – chair, The Association for Children Damaged by Hormone Pregnancy Tests. For services to Advocating for Scientific Research and Improving Patient Safety for Women
- Kirsteen Macdonald – Technical Through Life Support Lead, Air Domain, Defence Equipment and Support. For services to Defence and to Hearing Impaired Personnel
- Brian Madden – For services to the community in Oldham, Greater Manchester
- Dr Amrik Singh Mahal – Global Head of IT for Research, AstraZeneca. For services to Science and the COVID-19 Response
- Kenneth Wilson Manning – For services to the community in County Londonderry
- Carol Susan Marriott – Brownie Guide Leader, Girlguiding Newton District. For services to Young People in West Kirby, Wirral
- David Miles Marshall – For services to the community in Dunsmore, Buckinghamshire
- James Rooney Martin – For services to Military Veterans and to Charity
- Alasdair James Matheson – For services to the community of Golspie, Sutherland
- David Leslie Matten – For services to Kew Cricket Club, London Borough of Richmond upon Thames
- Lucas Maxwell – School Librarian, Glenthorne High School, Surrey. For services to Education
- Elizabeth McCann – Receptionist, Department for the Economy, Northern Ireland Civil Service. For Public Service
- Richard David McClune – For voluntary service to Police and Military Welfare in County Armagh
- Francis Samuel McCoubrey – For services to Local Government and to the community in West and North Belfast
- Karen Diane McCourt – Lately Foster Carer. For services to Foster Care in Northern Ireland
- Patrick Joseph McCourt – Lately Foster Carer. For services to Foster Care in Northern Ireland
- Anne Kidd Laird McDonald – For voluntary services to St Columba's Hospice Care, Edinburgh
- Audrey Jane McDowell – For voluntary and charitable services to the community in County Down
- Gordon Ernest McDowell – For services to Sport and to the community in County Down
- Jannette Mary Balgarnie McElarney – Scout Leader, 29th Odiham Pondtail Scout Group. For services to Young People in Fleet and Odiham District, Hampshire
- Myrtle Elise McGregor – Christian Aid Volunteer. For services to the community in Clarkston, Glasgow
- David McMath – Club Secretary and Groundsman, Castle Douglas Football Club. For services to Association Football
- Warrant Officer Benjamin Mearing, RNR – District Warrant Officer, Hertfordshire District, Eastern Area Sea Cadets. For voluntary services to Young People
- Jaysukhlal Shantilal Mehta – Director and OneJAIN Panel Coordinator, Institute of Jainology and OneJAIN UK. For services to Faith, Integration and Humanitarianism
- Phyllis Michael – For services to Girlguiding Ulster and to the community in County Londonderry
- Anne Margaret Milne – Secretary and Treasurer, Catherine Street Community Centre, Aberdeen. For services to the community in Aberdeen
- Colin Hugh Moir – Volunteer Coastguard Rescue Officer and lately Deputy Station Officer, Stonehaven. For services to Search and Rescue
- Gwendoline Anne Simpson Moir-stewart – Charity Fundraiser. For charitable services in South Lanarkshire
- Janice Ruth Moore – For services to the Keep Fit Association
- Roger John Morgan – Cadw Events Team Support, Welsh Government. For services to Heritage Education and Interpretation in Wales
- Helen Mortimer – Volunteer, Rotherham Samaritans. For services to People in Emotional Distress
- Fiona Nyawa Mulaisho – Senior Delivery Sponsor, Major Infrastructural Projects, Department for Transport. For services to Diversity and to the community in the London Borough of Brent
- Paul Mullen – For services to the community in County Tyrone
- Rosemarie Mullen – For services to the community in County Tyrone
- Sarah Jane Mullen – For services to the community in County Tyrone
- Patricia Mary Murray – Founder, Grandparents Of Kids With Cancer. For services to Cancer Support
- Supriya Nagarajan – Founder, chief executive officer and artistic director, Manasamitra. For services to Music
- Janet Nelson – Governor, Kineton Church of England Primary School, Warwick, Warwickshire. For services to Education
- Stephen Newell – For services to the community of Greyabbey, County Down
- David Peter Nicoll – Deputy 2nd Coxswain, Royal National Lifeboat Institution Falmouth Station, and Fundraising and Partnership Lead, South West, Royal National Lifeboat Institution. For services to Maritime Safety
- Thomas Edward Noblett – Lately Parish Councillor, Lapley, Stretton and Wheaton Aston Parish Council. For services to Local Government
- Sharon Nurse – For services to Midwifery and Neonatal Education in Northern Ireland
- Ann Elizabeth Nutt – chair, Patient Panel, The Princess Alexandra Hospital NHS Trust. For services to the NHS
- Kay Nuttall (kay carman) – For services to Members of the Concert Artistes Association, Brinsworth House and the Grand Order of Lady Ratlings
- Mary Nye – School Crossing Patrol, Holbrook Primary School, Horsham, West Sussex. For services to Road Safety
- Maureen Ann O'malley – For services to the community in Market Harborough, Leicestershire
- Jason William Oldfield – For services to the Kirkham and Wesham Cricket Club, Preston, Lancashire
- Colin David Oliphant – For services to the Environment and to the community in Southampton, Hampshire
- Dane Royston Bevis Oliver – For services to the community in the Test Valley
- Reginald Kenneth Orme, TD – For services to the Veteran Community in Merseyside
- Stephen Ornellas – For services to Charity and to the Preservation of Chinese Martial Arts in Liverpool, Merseyside
- Janet Anne Parks – Social Work Assistant, Birmingham's Children's Trust, Birmingham. For services to Children and Families
- Neil George Parsons – Boxing Coach. For services to Sport
- William James Kennedy Patterson – Governor, Stranmillis University College, Queen's University Belfast. For voluntary service to Higher Education
- David Paynter – Reserve Manager, Wildfowl and Wetlands Trust, Slimbridge Wetland Centre. For services to Wildlife Conservation
- Robert Anthony Pearce – National Ceremonial Training Officer, Sea Cadet Corps. For voluntary services to Young People
- Susan Julie Pearson – Fundraiser and Community Volunteer, Macmillan Cancer Support. For services to Charitable Fundraising
- Deborah Pezzani – Co-founder, Teens Unite. For services to Teenagers and Young Adults with Cancer
- Jane Rosemary Phythian – For services to Schools and to Education in Lancashire
- Patricia Ann Pinnington – For services to Girlguiding in Norfolk
- David Charles Porter – Pest Control and Dog Warden Manager, Neighbourhood Services, Luton Borough Council. For services to Local Government
- John Maynard Forsythe Porter – For services to Scouting and to the community in Northern Ireland
- John Percy Porter – Visits Officer, Water Safety Adviser and Fundraiser, Royal National Lifeboat Institution Scarborough Lifeboat Station. For voluntary services to the Royal National Lifeboat Institution
- Mark William Spencer Portsmouth – For services to Sport in Mumbles, Swansea
- Annemarie Power – For services to the community in Edenbridge, Kent
- Alan Preen – For services to the community in Bow Brickhill, Buckinghamshire
- Carol May Preston – Beaver Leader and Group Scout Leader, 82nd Newcastle Scout Group. For services to Young People in Newcastle upon Tyne
- Anne Elizabeth Radcliffe – For services to the community in Otterton, Devon
- Isabella Rafferty – Foster Carer. For services to Foster Care in Northern Ireland
- Rizwan Rehman – Chair of Governors, Lapage Primary School and Nursery, Bradford, West Yorkshire. For services to Education
- Brinley Reynolds – Finance Business Partner, Department for Culture, Media and Sport. For services to Government Finance and to Charity
- Hilary Richardson – For services to Girlguiding and to the community in Tobermore, County Londonderry
- Matilda Maud Richardson – Executive Officer, Police Service of Northern Ireland. For Public Service
- Maureen Grace Rickard – Lately Postmistress, St Minver Post Office. For services to the community in St. Minver, Cornwall
- Deborah Ann Roberts – Artistic Director and co-founder, Brighton Early Music Festival Charity. For charitable services to the community in Brighton, Sussex and the South East
- Susan Christian Robertson – Spiritual Care Team Member, NHS Ayrshire and Arran, and Volunteer Trustee and Community Administrator, Catrine Games Hall. For services to the community in Ayrshire and Arran
- Jean Rodger – For services to the community in Dalry, North Ayrshire
- John Rodgers – Secretary, St Patrick's Former Players Football Club. For services to Association Football
- Chandulal Hirji Rughani – chair, Lohana Social Club. For services to the community in North London
- Craig Allen Jones Doy Russo – Clinical Operational Manager, Police Custody Healthcare NHS, Leeds Community Healthcare NHS Trust. For services to Mental Health Nursing
- Joanne Sayer – Officer, National Crime Agency. For services to Law Enforcement
- Derrick Andrew Scott, MVO – Civic Team Manager for Civic Events and the Mayor's Office, Royal Borough of Windsor and Maidenhead. For services to Local Government
- Nigel Maurice Lidstone Scott – Scout Leader. For services to the Scout Movement and to Older People in the South West of Scotland
- Susan Iris Shapland – For voluntary services to Culture and to the community in West Somerset
- Margaret Fiona Shaw – Founder and Conductor, Ballianlay Choir. For services to Music and Fundraising on the Isle of Bute
- Ian Walter Sherman – For services to Street Drinkers, Substance Misusers and to the Homeless in Sheffield
- Craig Smart – chair, Freckfest Charity. For services to the community in Irvine and Ayrshire
- Jennifer Ann Smith – For services to the community in Huntly, Aberdeenshire
- Dr Kenneth Austin Smith – For services to the community in Dudley, West Midlands
- Timothy Richard Smith – Director of Music, St Mary's Church, Harrow on the Hill, London Borough of Harrow. For services to Music and to Education
- Shirley Rowena Snowden – For services to Dance and to the Arts
- James George William Stacey – For services to the community in Marlow, Buckinghamshire
- David Campbell Stazicker – For services to the community in Ely, Cambridgeshire
- Leonard George Stevenson – Special Inspector, Metropolitan Police Service. For services to Policing
- Mark Storer – Founder and chair, Brown Dog. For services to Charitable Fundraising for People with Cancer
- Audrey Patricia Taylor – For services to Amateur Swimming in East Sussex
- Isabel Christine Taylor – Committee Member, City of Manchester Fundraising Branch, Royal National Lifeboat Institution. For voluntary services to the Royal National Lifeboat Institution
- Samuel Taylor – School Caretaker, Windsor Hill Primary School, Newry. For services to Education and to the community in Newry, County Down
- Professor Janice Lee Thompson – Emeritus Honorary Professor of Public Health, Nutrition and Exercise, University of Birmingham. For services to Public Health
- Lucy Kate Thompson – Founder, Trustee and Volunteer, Childbase Charity Support Fund. For services to Charity and to the community in Hertfordshire
- Angela Thomson – Senior Charge Nurse, Royal Alexandra Hospital, Paisley, NHS Greater Glasgow and Clyde. For services to the NHS in Scotland
- Isabella McNeill Howie Thomson – Director, Centre Stage Company, Tranent. For services to Community Theatre in East Lothian, Scotland
- Carole Elizabeth Thorogood – Chair of Governors, Nottingham College. For services to Further Education
- Paula Tierney – For voluntary and charitable services to HomeStart Belfast North, particularly during COVID-19
- Elizabeth Ruth Timmis – For services to the community in Wetwood, Staffordshire
- The Reverend David William Stewart Todd – Theatre Chaplain, Edinburgh. For services to the Arts in Scotland
- Frances Veronica Tomlinson-Mynors – Organiser, Conservative MPs Wives, Husbands and Partners Group. For Parliamentary and Political Service
- Jonathan Peter Turner – Member and Bird Ringer, British Trust for Ornithology. For services to Bird Conservation
- Alan Charles William Twiddy – Technician Team Leader, City College Norwich, Norfolk. For services to Further Education
- Dr Andrew Douglas Tyerman – Trustee, Headway UK and lately Clinical Lead and Head of Service, Community Head Injury Service, Buckinghamshire Healthcare NHS Trust. For services to Rehabilitation After Acquired Brain Injury
- Matthew Lee Tyrrell – Postmaster. For services to the community in Penllergaer, West Glamorgan
- Patricia Ann Urry – Co-founder and lately chair, Roundhay Environmental Action Project. For services to the Environment
- June Vallance – For services to the Third Sector and to the community in North Lanarkshire
- Antony Michael Ward – Swimming Technical Official. For services to Swimming and Para Swimming
- Heather Yvonne Wenban – Lead Nurse for Dementia, Powys Teaching Health Board. For services to People with Dementia in Powys and Wales
- Janet Whitbourn – For services to the community in Spalding and South Holland, Lincolnshire
- Robert White – For services to Association Football and to Charity in North Belfast
- Dr Christian Jeremy Wilcock – Senior Partner, Friends Road Medical Practice. For services to the NHS and to the community in the London Borough of Croydon
- Dr Anna Charlotte Louise Williams – Consultant Anaesthetist, Betsi Cadwaladr University Health Board. For services to Environmentally Sustainable Healthcare at Wrexham Maelor Hospital
- Neil Andrew Williamson – Curator, Royal National Lifeboat Institution Whitby Lifeboat Museum and Launching Authority, Royal National Lifeboat Institution Whitby Lifeboat Station. For voluntary services to the Royal National Lifeboat Institution
- Sharon Wood – chair, Technical Committee, British Gymnastics. For services to Trampoline Gymnastics
- David Harold Woods – For services to the community in Woodford, Northamptonshire and to Charitable Fundraising for the NHS
- Valerie Woodward – For services to the community in Burtonwood, Cheshire

Diplomatic List

- Lesley Ann Blake. SSAFA The Armed Forces Charity France. For services to British Veterans in France.
- Carleigh Ashlin Chadwick. Community Liaison Officer, British Embassy Harare, Zimbabwe. For services to staff and families at the British Embassy in Harare.
- Adrian Peter Scott Cox. Town Councillor, Arromanches, France. For services to Veterans and their Families in France.
- Amanda Elizabeth Gurney. Head of Protocol, British Embassy Washington, United States of America. For services to the British Embassy in Washington.
- Paul Le Cornu. Deputy Head Government Butler, Protocol Directorate, Foreign, Commonwealth and Development Office. For services to Government Hospitality.
- Michael Walter Long Pease. Volunteer, Military Commemoration Projects, Portugal. For services to UK/Portugal Relations.
- Josephine Quinn. Honorary Secretary and Treasurer, Nchima Trust. For services to Charity Administration and to Disadvantaged Communities in Malawi.
- Lieutenant Colonel Alvin Everton Ryan. Royal Montserrat Defence Force and Director of Disaster Management Co-ordination Agency. For services to the Royal Montserrat Defence Force and Disaster Management in Montserrat.
- Maria Gwendoline Wilson. President, Orihuela Costa Branch, Asociacion Alicante Contra Cancer, Alicante, Spain. For services to Charity Fundraising in Spain.

Isle of Man

- Richard William Quayle. For services to the Isle of Man Road Races.

Guernsey

- Jonathan Alexander Reeve. For services to the Guernsey Government.
- Marguerite Renee Talmage. For services to the community in Guernsey.

Jersey

- Ronald Edward Perchard. For services to the Jersey Sea Cadet Corps.

=== Royal Red Cross ===
Royal Red Cross ribbon

==== Associates of the Royal Red Cross (ARRC) ====
- Major Robert Stuart Garbett, VR, Queen Alexandra's Royal Army Nursing Corps, Army Reserve
- Squadron Leader Harmony Avril Slade

=== King's Police Medal (KPM) ===
King's Police Medal ribbon

England and Wales

- Phillip Anslow Carruth. Detective Inspector, Metropolitan Police Service.
- Kathleen Mary Coulter. lately Detective Sergeant, South Yorkshire Police. (South Yorkshire)
- Nicholas Dean. Chief Constable, Cambridgeshire Constabulary. (Cambridgeshire)
- Richard Debicki. lately Deputy Chief Constable, North Wales Police. (North Wales)
- Stephen Ellen. Deputy Chief Constable, Sovereign Base Area Police – Cyprus.
- Professor Stanley Weir Gilmour. lately Detective Superintendent, Thames Valley Police.
- Catherine Elizabeth Larsen. lately Inspector, Avon and Somerset Constabulary. (Somerset)
- David William McCaughrean. lately Detective Superintendent, Merseyside Police. (Merseyside)
- Helen Ramsay Millichap. Deputy Assistant Commissioner, Metropolitan Police Service.
- Dr. Olaniyi Opaleye. Special Sergeant, Kent Police. (Kent)
- Nicholas Paul Reuter. lately Sergeant, Thames Valley Police.
- Alan Rhees-Cooper. Chief Inspector, West Yorkshire Police. (West Yorkshire)
- Christopher John Rowley. lately Chief Constable, Lancashire Constabulary. (Lancashire)
- James Rudge. lately Detective Sergeant, West Yorkshire Police. (West Yorkshire)
- Mark Alan Webster. Chief Constable, Cleveland Police.
- Fraser Wilson. Chief Inspector, Cleveland Police.
- Viran Wiltshire. Detective Sergeant, Metropolitan Police Service.
- David Yansen. Constable, Metropolitan Police Service.

Scotland

- Alistair Cameron. Special Constable, Police Service of Scotland.
- Catriona Paton. Chief Superintendent, Police Service of Scotland.

Northern Ireland

- John Cardwell. Detective Chief Inspector, Police Service of Northern Ireland.
- Niall McCready. Detective Sergeant, Police Service of Northern Ireland.
- Mervyn Seffen. Superintendent, Police Service of Northern Ireland.

Overseas Territories

- Derek Byrne. lately Chief Officer and Commissioner of Police, Royal Cayman Islands Police Service.

=== King's Fire Service Medal (KFSM) ===
King's Fire Service Medal ribbon

England and Wales

- Robert Kenneth Barber. Chief Fire Officer, Staffordshire Fire and Rescue Service. (Staffordshire)
- Dr. Sabrina Rachel Cohen-Hatton. Chief Fire Officer, West Sussex Fire and Rescue Service. (West Sussex)
- Roger Simon Thomas. Chief Fire Officer, Mid and West Wales Fire and Rescue Service.

Scotland

- Gary Scott Carroll. Crew Commander, Scottish Fire and Rescue Service.
- Ross Haggart. Chief Officer, Scottish Fire and Rescue Service.
- Lorraine Taylor. Firefighter, Scottish Fire and Rescue Service.

=== King's Ambulance Service Medal (KAM) ===
King's Ambulance Service Medal ribbon

England and Wales

- David Alexander Dean. Senior Paramedic Mentor, East of England Ambulance Service.
- Michael Andrew Farthing Jenkins. Regional Clinical Lead-Consultant Paramedic, Welsh Ambulance Service.
- Ola Adel Zahran. Chief Technology Officer, Yorkshire Ambulance Service. (Yorkshire)

Scotland

- Liam Coughlan. Head of Programmes & Enabling Technology Manager, Scottish Ambulance Service.

Northern Ireland

- Heather Anne Foster-Sharpe. Assistant Director Emergency Preparedness, Resilience and Response, Northern Ireland Ambulance Service.

Guernsey

- Mark Mapp. Chief Executive Officer, Ambulance & Rescue Guernsey.

=== King's Volunteer Reserves Medal (KVRM) ===
King's Volunteer Reserves Medal ribbon

- Warrant Officer 1 Gary Robert Doke, Royal Naval Reserve
- Corporal Nicholas Anthony Cranfield, VR, Corps of Royal Electrical and Mechanical Engineers, Army Reserve
- Lieutenant Colonel Charles Edward Dyer Field, VR, The Royal Yeomanry, Army Reserve
- Staff Sergeant Kevin William McLean, VR, Royal Corps of Signals, Army Reserve
- Colonel Jonathan Layton Prichard, Army Reserve
- Wing Commander Stephen Michael Fry, DL
- Squadron Leader Simon James Kirkbridge
- Master Aircrew Dean William Edward Penlington, MBE

=== Overseas Territories Police Medal (OTPM) ===
Overseas Territories Police Medal ribbon

- John Field. Police Superintendent, Royal Gibraltar Police. For services to Policing.

== Crown Dependencies ==
=== The Most Excellent Order of the British Empire ===
==== Knight Commander of the Order of the British Empire (KBE) ====
Isle of Man

- Mark Simon Cavendish, MBE. For services to Cycling and Charity Work.

==== Member of the Order of the British Empire (MBE) ====
Isle of Man

- Captain Stephen Patrick Carter. For services to Maritime Safety and to the community on the Isle of Man.

Guernsey

- Jurat David John Robilliard. For services to The Church and to the Bailiwick of Guernsey.

Jersey

- Leslie Norman. For services to people with Learning Disabilities in Jersey.
- Rosemary Walker Pallot. For services to Community through Mustard Seed, Jersey.
- Richard Frank Robins, Trustee and Treasurer, Shelter Trust. For services to the Homeless in Jersey.

== Australia ==
The 2024 King's Birthday Honours for Australia were announced on 10 June 2024 by the Governor-General, David Hurley.

== New Zealand ==
The 2024 Birthday Honours for New Zealand were announced on 3 June 2024 by the Governor-General, Dame Cindy Kiro.

== Cook Islands ==
Below are the individuals appointed by Charles III in his right as King of the Realm of New Zealand, on the advice of His Majesty's Cook Islands Ministers.

=== Most Excellent Order of the British Empire ===
Civil division ribbon

==== Officer of the Order of the British Empire (OBE) ====
Civil

- Ritua Kathleen Rose Marie Koteka. For services to Health, the Public and to the Community.

==== Member of the Order of the British Empire (MBE) ====
Civil

- Mareana Taikoko. For services to Mental Healthcare and Awareness, and to the Community.

=== British Empire Medal (BEM) ===
British Empire Medal ribbon

- Juliana Teinakore Etches. For Public Service, to Education and to Culture.
- Tutavake Tutai. For services to the Community.

== The Bahamas ==
Below are the individuals appointed by Charles III in his right as King of The Bahamas, on the advice of His Majesty's Bahamas Ministers.

=== Knight Bachelor ===
Knight Bachelor ribbon

- Gerald Deveaux. For Outstanding Services to Humanity and Entertainment

=== Most Distinguished Order of St Michael and St George ===
Order of St Michael and St George ribbon

==== Companion of the Order of St Michael and St George (CMG) ====
- Marsha Nicole Campbell. For Public Service.
- Dr. Franklin Walkine. For services to Public Health.

== Grenada ==
Below are the individuals appointed by Charles III in his right as King of Grenada, on the advice of His Majesty's Grenada Ministers.

=== Most Excellent Order of the British Empire ===
Civil division ribbon

==== Dame Commander of the Order of the British Empire (DBE) ====
Civil

- Joan Purcell. For Public Service and to the Community.

==== Member of the Order of the British Empire (OBE) ====
Civil

- Agnes Dorothy Lessey. For services to the Community.

=== British Empire Medal (BEM) ===
British Empire Medal ribbon

- Gerard Bethel. For services to Entrepreneurship in the Fishing Industry.
- Elizabeth Forsyth. For services to Education.

== Papua New Guinea ==
Below are the individuals appointed by Charles III in his right as King of Papua New Guinea, on the advice of His Majesty's Papua New Guinea Ministers.

=== Knight Bachelor ===
Knight Bachelor ribbon

- Arthur Llewellyn Jones, OBE. For services to Business and to the Community.

=== Most Excellent Order of the British Empire ===
Civil division ribbon

Military division ribbon

==== Knight Commander of the Order of the British Empire (KBE) ====
Civil

- John Bangkok, BEM. For services to Business and to the Community.

==== Commander of the Order of the British Empire (CBE) ====
Military

- Commodore (Rear Admiral) Phillip Poleware, MBE.

Civil

- Andrew Charles Abel. For services to Surfing Industries.
- Ahmad Bin Ismail. For services to Business and to the Community.
- Ian Alan Tarutia, OBE. For services to Business and to the Public and Private Sectors.

==== Officer of the Order of the British Empire (OBE) ====
Military

- Colonel Dominic Bulungol, MBE.

Civil

- Victor Gabi. For services to the Public.
- Vaghi Gairowagga. For Public Service.
- Williamson Hosea. For Public Service.
- Beatrice Mahuru. For services to the Private Sector.
- Sosepe Kerowa Maminti. For services to the Private Sector.
- Captain Phillip Leonard Marshall. For services to the Aviation Industries.
- Joe Kenken Mok. For services to the Real Estate Industry.

==== Member of the Order of the British Empire (MBE) ====
Military

- Colonel Tony Aseavu
- Colonel Tony Oawa
- Colonel Dickers Esso

Civil

- Phillip Alu. For services to Education.
- Aria Asi. For services to the Public.
- Steven Enomb Kilanda. For Public Service.
- Molly O'Rourke. For services to the Community.
- Bogi Raga. For services to the Electoral Commissioner.

=== British Empire Medal (BEM) ===
Civil division ribbon

Military division ribbon

Military

- Warrant Officer Joseph Dalid
- Chief Warrant Officer Eddie Foiap
- Chief Warrant Officer Silas Huaziembe
- Chief Warrant Officer Jacob Yakea

Civil

- Terence Aluna. For services to Central Government and to the Community.
- Tobby Bobby. For services to the Community.
- Captain David Faithful. For services to Lutheran Shipping in Lae Morobe Province.
- Mairi Homosi. For services to the Community.
- Michael Kelena. For services to the Public.
- Sharon Mamangi. For services to the Community and to Education.
- George Noble. For Public Service.

== Solomon Islands ==
Below are the individuals appointed by Charles III in his right as King of Solomon Islands, on the advice of His Majesty's Solomon Islands Ministers.

=== Most Distinguished Order of St Michael and St George ===
Order of St Michael and St George ribbon

==== Knight Commander of the Order of St Michael and St George (KCMG) ====
- Dr. Jimmie Rodgers. For Public Service, to Health and to the community in The Solomon Islands and Abroad.

=== Most Excellent Order of the British Empire ===
Civil division ribbon

==== Knight Commander of the Order of the British Empire (KBE) ====
Civil

- Waeta Ben Tabusasi. For Political and Public Service, and to Community Development.

==== Officer of the Order of the British Empire (OBE) ====
Civil

- Marktas Forau. For services to the Solomon Islands Judicial System.

==== Member of the Order of the British Empire (MBE) ====
Civil

- John Richard Seketala. For services to Rural and Community Development.

== Saint Lucia ==
Below are the individuals appointed by Charles III in his right as King of Saint Lucia, on the advice of His Majesty's Saint Lucia Ministers.

=== Most Excellent Order of the British Empire ===
Civil division ribbon

==== Officer of the Order of the British Empire (OBE) ====
Civil

- Winston Branch. For services to the Creative and Fine Arts.
- Harold Dalsan. For services to Community Infrastructure and Development.

== Belize ==
Below are the individuals appointed by Charles III in his right as King of Belize, on the advice of His Majesty's Belize Ministers.

=== Most Excellent Order of the British Empire ===
Civil division ribbon

==== Commander of the Order of the British Empire (CBE) ====
Civil

- Raymond Kearney. For services to Business.

==== Officer of the Order of the British Empire (OBE) ====
Civil

- Felicita Cantun. For services to Culture.
- Beverly Ann Louise Wade. For services to the Environment.

==== Member of the Order of the British Empire (MBE) ====
Civil

- Mark Anthony Chavaria. For services to Sport.
- Howell Austin Gillett. For services to the Community.
- Robert Amadeo Mariano. For services to the Community.

== Antigua and Barbuda ==
Below are the individuals appointed by Charles III in his right as King of Antigua and Barbuda, on the advice of His Majesty's Antigua and Barbuda Ministers.

=== Most Distinguished Order of St Michael and St George ===
Order of St Michael and St George ribbon

==== Companion of the Order of St Michael and St George (CMG) ====
- Colonel Telbert Benjamin. For services to The Antigua and Barbuda Defence Force.

== Saint Kitts and Nevis ==
Below are the individuals appointed by Charles III in his right as King of Saint Christopher and Nevis, on the advice of His Majesty's Saint Kitts and Nevis Ministers.

=== Most Excellent Order of the British Empire ===
Civil division ribbon

==== Officer of the Order of the British Empire (OBE) ====
Civil

- Jennifer Naomi Nero. For services to Sport and to Banking

==== Member of the Order of the British Empire (MBE) ====
Civil

- Georid Arthurlyn Belle. For services to Customs and Excise.
- Henrietta Douglas-Christmas. For Public Service.
