= Papyrus UK =

British suicide prevention charity

- Papyrus Prevention of Young Suicide
- Formation: 1997
- Founder: Jean Kerr
- Registration no.: 1070896
- Legal status: Charity
- Headquarters: Bankside 2, Crosfield Street, Warrington, Cheshire, WA1 1UP
- Location: United Kingdom
- Region served: United Kingdom
- Website: www.papyrus-uk.org (Archived)

Papyrus Prevention of Young Suicide, also known as Papyrus UK, was a British charity which aimed to reduce the number of suicides among young people. It was founded in 1997 by a group of parents whose children had taken their own lives. It was founded as Parents' Association for the Prevention of Young Suicide, from which the name Papyrus is derived. The charity worked with those aged 35 and younger in the UK.

In 2017, as part of a campaign "Save the class of 2018", Papyrus produced a guide for schools and colleges on suicide prevention. In 2022, Universities UK worked with Papyrus to produce guidelines on suicide prevention for universities.

To mark World Suicide Prevention Day in 2021, the animation studio Blue Zoo created an animation, Sinking Feeling, for Papyrus "about a young person’s desperate struggle with life", in place of their usual annual creation of a comedy short.

The then Home Secretary Sajid Javid gave a speech in June 2022 at Papyrus's headquarters, after chairing a round-table discussion, in which he spoke of his brother's suicide and said he had "heard heart-breaking tales of love and loss but also inspirational stories of the work being done to divert people from this painful path, including, of course, the work of Papyrus here".

== 3 Dads Walking ==
Three men whose daughters had killed themselves joined together as 3 Dads Walking to raise funds for Papyrus and awareness of youth suicide. They carried out long-distance walks to raise funds, and published a book Three Dads Walking: 300 Miles of Hope (2024, Robinson: ISBN 978-1472148445). The three, Andy Airey (father of Sophie), Tim Owen (father of Emily) and Mike Palmer (father of Beth), were appointed MBE in the 2024 Birthday Honours, each described as "Fundraiser, 3 Dads Walking for Papyrus UK" and recognised "For services to the Prevention of Young Suicide." Their initial walk was a 300-mile (480 km) route from Cumbria via Greater Manchester to Norfolk, linking their three homes. In 2022 they walked over 600 miles (970 km) between the four parliaments of the United Kingdom, from Belfast to London via Edinburgh and Cardiff, urging the governments to include suicide prevention in the school curriculum. In 2024 their "Walk of Hope" of 500 mi (800 km), from Stirling to Norwich, visited the east coast for the first time and included several of Papyrus's newly-opened offices which their fund-raising had helped to support. As of June 2024 they had raised over £1.4 million for Papyrus.

An early day motion passed by the House of Commons in 2022 expressed support for their "brave, tireless and selfless campaigning", noted that suicide is the major cause of death among under-35s in the United Kingdom, and called on the government to embed suicide awareness in the school curriculum and increase mental health training for education staff.

== Closure ==
In September 2026 Papyrus announced that it would be closing due to ongoing financial pressures. The charity went into administration with insolvency practitioners being appointed to handle the process. The closure caused the immediate loss of all of Papyrus' services, including their HOPELINE247, a 24 hour suicide prevention hotline.

== See also ==
- Suicide in the United Kingdom
