= Rhona Stainthorp =

Emerita Professor of Education at the University of Reading

Rhona Stainthorp OBE is a British academic. She is an Emerita Professor at the Institute of Education, University of Reading. She specialises in reading development and challenges, with her research focusing on the role of phonics in literacy.

In 2024, she was recognised with an Order of the British Empire in the King's Birthday Honours for her contributions to education.

== Education ==
Stainthorp completed an undergraduate degree in politics at the University of Nottingham, followed by a Bachelor of Science (BSc) in psychology at Birkbeck College, University of London (now Birkbeck, University of London). She later obtained a master's degree in Human Communication from the UCL Queen Square Institute of Neurology, and a PhD under the supervision of Professor Maggie Snowling.

== Research ==
Stainthorp has participated in a number of research projects focused on literacy and reading development. These include studies on the use of e-readers among Key Stage 2 students, transcription skills and literacy at Key Stage 3, and spelling at Key Stage 2. She has also contributed to research on the role of orthographic processing in reading and its connection to rapid automatised naming deficits, funded by the Economic and Social Research Council (ESRC).

== Books ==
- Learning from children who read at an early age. London: Routledge. (1999). ISBN 978-0415174954.
- Reading Development and Teaching (Discoveries & Explanations in Child Development). SAGE Publications Ltd;. 21 December 2015. ISBN 978-1446249048.
