= Jadranka Beresford-Peirse =

Croatian-British philanthropist (1938–2026)

Jadranka, Lady Beresford-Peirse (1938–2026) was a Croatian-British philanthropist. In 1991, she founded the International Trust for Croatian Monuments to restore cultural buildings in Croatia and later to raise awareness of Croatian art and culture.

== Early life and education ==
Jadranka Njers was born in Durdenovac, Croatia, Yugoslavia on 20 August 1938. She was the daughter of Ivan Njers, a company executive, and Dragica Njers, a teacher. The family moved to the Croatian capital of Zagreb, where Njers grew up. She studied English and Italian at university before moving to London to be an au pair. She later got a job at the Yugoslav tourist board in London.

== Career ==
In 1991, Beresford-Peirse founded of the International Trust for Croatian Monuments. She founded the trust to help repair cultural buildings in Croatia. As a trustee, Beresford-Peirse, organised recitals and exhibitions to raised money. She commissioned artwork specifically for the purpose.

The trust later pivoted to supporting Croatian artists, the training of masons, and students in Britain and also raising awareness of Croatian art and culture internationally. In 2009, she spearheaded the publication of a book of essays entitled Croatia: Aspects of Art, Architecture and Cultural Heritage.

The trust celebrated its 25th anniversary in 2016.

== Awards and honours ==
In 2024, Beresford-Peirse was made a Member of the British Empire in the King's Birthday Honours, for services to British-Croation relations, to philanthropy and to the protection of Croatian cultural heritage.

== Personal life and death ==
In 1996, she married Henry Beresford-Peirse, an investment banker. When her husband succeeded to the Beresford-Peirse baronetcy in 1972, Njers became Lady Beresford-Peirse. Her husband died in 2013. The couple had two sons. Her sister is the artist, Ljerka Njers.

Jadranka, Lady Beresford-Peirse died on 12 September 2026. She was 88.
