= Boxing in the Bahamas =

Boxing in the Bahamas is practised at both professional and amateur (Olympic-style) level. Professional boxing is regulated by the Bahamas Boxing Commission under the Boxing Control Rules, and amateur boxing is overseen by the Bahamas Boxing Federation, which is listed by the Bahamas Olympic Committee.

Organised boxing in Nassau expanded in the 1940s under the promoter Charles Major Sr., who helped establish Nassau Stadium as a venue for boxing and other sports. In 1975 Elisha Obed (Everette Ferguson) became the first Bahamian world champion, winning the World Boxing Council light middleweight title in Paris. Nassau also hosted Muhammad Ali's last professional fight, against Trevor Berbick in December 1981.

The Bahamas first sent boxers to the Olympic Games in 1972, and its boxers have won Commonwealth Games bronze medals through Steve Larrimore in 1982 and Valentino Knowles and Carl Hield in 2010.

A separate Bahamas World Boxing Federation was announced in January 2025 and admitted to the international federation World Boxing that March. The Bahamas Boxing Academy is developing a National Boxing Gym, intended as a centre for training and competition that also offers support services for young people.

== History ==
=== Colonial period ===
Organised boxing in Nassau expanded in the 1940s, when Charles Major Sr. staged shows that drew spectators from across New Providence. Major also set up a recreation centre in the area of Nassau known as "The Pond", brought in visiting fighters such as Joe Louis and Willie Pep, and helped establish Nassau Stadium as a venue for boxing and other sports.

Two professionals from Bimini were widely known in the middle of the century. William "Yama Bahama" Butler Jr. was a television "feature fighter" at Madison Square Garden in the 1950s and 1960s, and Gomeo Brennan twice won the Commonwealth middleweight championship. Other Bahamian professionals who fought abroad included "Sugar Cliff", Wendall Newton and "Baby Boy" Rolle, while the local circuit in Nassau featured Cubel McCoy, Stoney Godet, George Knowles, Sammy Isaacs, Roy Armbrister, Cleveland "KO" Parris and Leonard "Boston Blackie" Miller.

Organised amateur boxing developed around the Amateur Boxing Association of The Bahamas (later a federation), which had its home at Nassau Stadium. The association's early officers and staff were Virginius Knowles, Charles Major Sr., Fred Sturrup, Amos Ferguson, Bert Perry and Rudy Moultrie.

=== Independent Bahamas ===
The modern amateur boxing programme in the Bahamas dates to 1968, prior to independence in 1973, with Bert Perry and Charlie Major Sr. credited as key early figures in the programme's development. Perry has been described as the first national coach of the amateur programme.

In professional boxing, Everette "Elisha Obed" Ferguson won the WBC super welterweight world title in Paris on 12 November 1975 and later made two successful title defences in 1976 before losing the belt later that year. Nassau's association with major international professional boxing events in this period includes Muhammad Ali's final bout in December 1981.

In amateur boxing, Steve Larrimore won a bronze medal at the 1982 Commonwealth Games and competed at the 1984 Summer Olympics.

From the 2000s onward, domestic boxing activity continued through club-led programmes, development shows and tournaments in Nassau and the Family Islands. These events included the Ray Minus Sr End of Year Boxing Show and the Wellington "Sonny Boy" Rahming Silver Gloves tournament at Wulff Road. In 2016, clubs were also reported as staging exhibitions and tutorials in Exuma as part of outreach activity.

In professional boxing, the Bahamas hosted an all-female professional boxing card in 2023, headlined by a World Boxing Association world middleweight title bout. In 2024, a memorial boxing show at the National Boxing Gymnasium was held in memory of Ray Minus Jr and was announced as an annual event.

The Bahamas World Boxing Federation was formed in November 2024 and was later admitted to the international federation World Boxing in March 2025. In 2025, the Bahamas Boxing Academy began renovating government-leased buildings at the Sports Centre in Nassau while continuing training programmes, including youth training and competitive pathways.

== Participation of Bahamian boxers in international competitions ==
Nathaniel "Nat" Knowles and Garry Davis represented the Bahamas in boxing at the 1972 Summer Olympics in Munich. Knowles later won a silver medal at the 1974 Central American and Caribbean Games in Santo Domingo, described in local coverage as the Bahamas' first international boxing medal.

Steve Larrimore won a bronze medal in boxing at the 1982 Commonwealth Games and later competed at the 1984 Summer Olympics in Los Angeles. Tureano Johnson represented the Bahamas in boxing at the 2008 Summer Olympics in Beijing.

In the lead-up to qualification for the 2012 London Olympics, Valentino Knowles and Carl Hield attended an International Boxing Association training camp in Cardiff, Wales, in early 2009. Knowles and Hield won bronze medals in boxing at the 2010 Commonwealth Games in New Delhi. Their attempt to qualify for the 2012 Summer Olympics ended at the American Olympic qualifying tournament in Rio de Janeiro in May 2012, where both were eliminated in the final qualifying round.

In 2016, Rashield Williams won gold at the Caribbean Development Boxing Tournament in Bridgetown, Barbados, and advanced to the second round at the final Olympic qualifying event in Baku, Azerbaijan. At the 2018 Commonwealth Games on the Gold Coast in Queensland, Australia, Carl Hield and Rashield Williams were reported as being eliminated in the round of 32 of their respective events.

== Infrastructure ==
=== Governance, regulation and heritage ===
Professional boxing in the Bahamas is regulated under the Boxing Control Rules (1990), which establish the Bahamas Boxing Commission and set out permitting, licensing and contest oversight provisions.

For Olympic-style boxing, the Bahamas Olympic Committee lists the Bahamas Boxing Federation and its officers in its sports contacts directory. In January 2025, the Bahamas World Boxing Federation was announced as a separate organisation formed in November 2024. World Boxing later listed the World Boxing Federation of the Bahamas among new members approved in March 2025. On the same day, Bahamas Boxing Federation president Vincent Strachan stated that his federation would remain aligned with the International Boxing Association and referenced funding and event opportunities, while describing the parallel structures as potentially expanding opportunities for athletes in the short term. However, boxing had not been upgraded to the Ministry of Sports "core sport" category despite international results.

The Retired Boxers Association has announced Hall of Fame award plans and described an intention to create a museum for boxing history and memorabilia.

=== Venues, clubs, competitions and coaching ===
Nassau Stadium has been described as a central venue for Bahamian boxing and as the home facility for the amateur association at the time it was formed. The boxing centre at the Baillou Hills Sporting Complex was described as the main training facility at the time, with additional training planned at a Flamingo Gardens facility.

Local boxing shows and exhibition events have also been associated with the National Boxing Gymnasium and Wulff Road facilities, including the Frederick Sturrup Boxing Show, the Ray Minus Jr memorial exhibition event, and club competition at Wulff Road Boxing Square.

Domestic amateur boxing has been organised around recurring tournaments and club calendars. The Sonny Boy Rahming Silver Gloves has been described as a showcase for youth boxers and inter-club matchups, and the Champion Amateur Boxing Club's Ray Minus Sr End of Year Boxing Show as a youth development programme staged at the Wulff Road Youth Development Boxing Center and Nassau Stadium.

Coaching and administrative figures associated with the amateur programme include Bert Perry (described as the first national coach) and Andre Seymour (head coach during Olympic qualification campaigns). A 2024 memorial report described Valentino Knowles as a national boxing coach who trained amateur boxers at the National Boxing Gymnasium.

Outreach beyond Nassau has included exhibitions and tutorials staged in the Family Islands. In 2016, Major Pain Boxing Club and Champion Boxing Club were reported as holding exhibitions and tutorials in George Town, Exuma, as part of outreach activity.

In 2018, a "Commonwealth Boxing Salute" in Freeport on Grand Bahama was described as combining youth bouts with a two-day seminar intended to certify boxing officials.

The Bahamas Boxing Academy operates from two government-leased buildings at the Queen Elizabeth Sports Centre in Nassau, which it is renovating while training continues. The Academy's National Boxing Gym project combines elite training with youth mentorship and support for at-risk youth. The Academy's chairman Nick Maughan committed more than one million dollars to the project, alongside support from BoxWise and other partners.
