= Mais Lecture =

Lecture series at the Bayes Business School in London

The Mais Lecture has been hosted since 1978, on a mostly annual basis, by Bayes Business School (formerly Cass), part of City, University of London.

The lecture is named in honour of Lord Mais, the 645th Lord Mayor of the City of London (1972–73), and Pro-Chancellor of City University (1979–84). He played a key role in establishing City University's Centre of Excellence for Banking and Finance, now the Centre for Banking Research, part of the wider Bayes Faculty of Finance.

The lecture is regarded as a leading event for the banking and finance community of the City of London, having hosted a number of prestigious speakers including successive Prime Ministers, Chancellors of the Exchequer, and Governors of the Bank of England, and notably the forum in which successive Chancellors and Shadow Chancellors have set out their economic philosophy and policies.

== Notable milestones ==
In January 2021 Anneliese Dodds, Shadow Chancellor of the Exchequer, became the first woman to deliver the Mais Lecture.

In March 2026 Rachel Reeves, delivered an unprecedented second Mais Lecture – almost precisely two years to the day after her first – this time as Chancellor, having been Shadow Chancellor at the time of her first. In a further family connection, her husband, Nicholas Joicey, was speechwriter for Gordon Brown when the Chancellor delivered his Mais Lecture in 1999.

Eight of the 15 Chancellors since its inception have delivered a Mais Lecture, including all three Labour Chancellors.

While three Prime Ministers of the United Kingdom have delivered the Mais Lecture, Tony Blair is the only one who was neither Chancellor nor Shadow Chancellor when he did so.

Mark Carney delivered his Mais Lecture in 2014, while he was Governor of the Bank of England, he subsequently became Prime Minister of Canada in 2025.

== List of Mais Lectures ==
Lecture	Date	Delivered by	Title
First	9 Feb 1978	Gordon Richardson	Reflections on the Conduct of Monetary Policy
Second	Nov 1979	Lionel Robbins	Objectives of Monetary Policy: Past and Present
Third	May 1981	Geoffrey Howe	The Fight Against Inflation
Fourth	Mar 1983	Friedrich Hayek	Science and Ethics
Fifth	18 Jun 1984	Nigel Lawson	The British Experiment
Sixth	May 1986	Roy Jenkins	The International Finance Scene: Can Sense be Plucked Out of Danger
Seventh	May 1987	Robin Leigh-Pemberton	The Instruments of Monetary Policy
Eighth	May 1988	Michel Camdessus	The IMF in a Changing World
Ninth	May 1989	Samuel Brittan	A Restatement of Economic Liberalism
Tenth	May 1990	Gordon Pepper	Monetary Policy: A Post-Mortem and Proposal
Eleventh	May 1992	Erik Hoffmeyer	Economic and Monetary Union: The Case for Central Bank Independence
Twelfth	Jun 1993	Peter Lilley	Benefits and Costs: Securing and Future of Social Security
Thirteenth	May 1994	Kenneth Clarke	The Changing World of Work in the 1990s
Fourteenth	22 May 1995	Tony Blair	The Economic Framework for New Labour
Fifteenth	Oct 1996	Michael Heseltine	Achieving Competitiveness in a Global Economy
Sixteenth	24 Jun 1997	Edward George	Monetary Policy in Britain and Europe
Seventeenth	May 1998	Hans Tietmeyer	Financial and Monetary Integration: Benefits, Opportunities, and Pitfalls
Eighteenth	19 Oct 1999	Gordon Brown	The Conditions for Full Employment
Nineteenth	May 2000	Jonathan Sacks	Markets, Governments, and Virtues
Twentieth	May 2001	Valery Giscard d'Estaing	The New European Debate: The Euro-zone and the Greater Europe
Twenty-first	Apr 2003	Ernst Welteke	Reflections on European Monetary Policy
Twenty-second	12 May 2004	Otmar Issing	The Euro: the First Five Years
Twenty-third	17 May 2005	Mervyn King	Monetary Policy: Practice Ahead of Theory
Twenty-fourth	29 Oct 2008	Alistair Darling	Chancellor Reveals His Plans to Maintain Economic Stability
Twenty-fifth	13 May 2009	Axel A. Weber	Reflections on the Financial Crisis
Twenty-sixth	24 Feb 2010	George Osborne	A New Economic Model
Twenty-seventh	13 Jul 2011	Paul Volcker	The World of Finance and the National Interest
Twenty-eighth	8 May 2012	Patrick Honohan	The Experience of Financial Integration – Ireland, Britain, Europe
Twenty-ninth	18 Mar 2014	Mark Carney	One Mission. One Bank. Promoting the Good of the People of the United Kingdom.
Thirtieth	7 Oct 2015	Olivier Blanchard	Rethinking Macro (Stabilisation) Policy
Thirty-first	12 Jun 2017	Brian Griffiths	Restoring Trust in the Banking System
Thirty-second	29 Oct 2018	José Manuel Barroso	The European Union and the Changing International Landscape
Thirty-third	13 Jan 2021	Anneliese Dodds	The challenges of the post-Covid, post-Brexit UK economy – a response [delivered virtually]
Thirty-fourth	24 Feb 2022	Rishi Sunak	A new culture of enterprise
Thirty-fifth	5 Jun 2023	Odile Renaud-Basso	How to green the global economy
Thirty-sixth	19 Mar 2024	Rachel Reeves	Economic Growth in an Age of Insecurity
Thirty-seventh	27 Mar 2025	Isabel Schnabel	Financial literacy and monetary policy transmission
Thirty-eighth	17 Mar 2026	Rachel Reeves	The Active and Strategic State

== See also ==
- Mansion House speech
- Hayek Lectures
- Henry Thornton Lectures
- Contrarian Lectures
- Gresham College
- John Locke Lectures
- Richard Dimbleby Lectures
