= Nick Maughan Foundation =

British philanthropic foundation

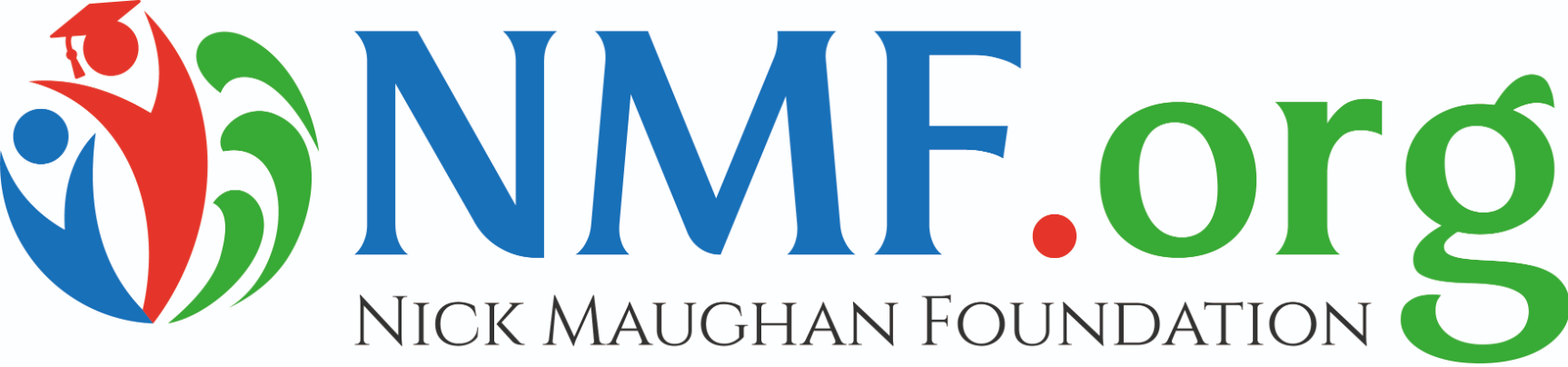
- Formation: 2020
- Founder: Nick Maughan CBE
- Type: Donor-advised fund
- Website: Official website

The Nick Maughan Foundation (NMF), also known as the Nick Maughan Family Foundation, is a British philanthropic fund established in 2020 by investor and philanthropist Nick Maughan. Privately funded by Maughan, it supports projects in education, community development and the environment, including wildlife conservation and carbon sequestration. NMF is structured as a donor-advised fund at NPT UK, a registered charity in England and Wales, and does not accept public donations.

== Activities ==
=== Education ===
NMF's education programmes are intended to reduce disparities in educational opportunity, particularly for children and students from lower-income backgrounds. During the COVID-19 pandemic, amid concerns that educational disruption was widening existing attainment gaps, Maughan argued for greater investment in after-school activities and international educational opportunities to help pupils recover lost ground.

The foundation funds full bursaries at Putney High School, postgraduate scholarships at Bayes Business School and educational infrastructure in eastern Uganda.

=== Youth development and community programmes ===
BoxWise was founded in 2020 by Maughan and Rick Ogden and was fully funded by NMF during its early years. Its free non-contact boxing programmes combine boxing with mentoring and routes into further education or employment, and have expanded across the United Kingdom and abroad.

NMF supports the Charlie Miller Football Academy in Glasgow and contributed to Berkshire Youth's Waterside Centre in Newbury. It has also supported Dallaglio RugbyWorks and StreetDoctors and partnered with the Centre for Social Justice on research into the use of sport and physical activity for young people at risk of crime and antisocial behaviour.

In the Bahamas, NMF funds the Bahamas Boxing Academy, founded by Maughan in Nassau in 2025. The academy combines boxing training with mentoring and educational support, and its rebuilt complex includes indoor and outdoor training facilities and educational and residential space for young athletes.

=== Environment and conservation ===
NMF supports wildlife conservation and carbon-sequestration projects. It committed £1 million over five years to Tusk Trust's Conservation Awards and matched donations of up to £150,000 made through The Times and The Sunday Times Christmas Appeal. NMF also sponsors the annual Tusk Wildlife Ranger Award and has sponsored the charity's biennial Conservation Symposium.

=== International development and health ===
In eastern Uganda, NMF works with Spotlight on Africa on health and education projects. These include the Nick Maughan Maternity Centre in Mbale, a 100-bed facility providing maternity and neonatal care, the NMF Riverside School and the Nick Maughan Advanced Information Technology Centre at Musoto Christian School.

NMF has also donated to Womb Transplant UK and research into uterine transplantation.
