= Contrarian Prize =

The Contrarian Prize is a prize which has been awarded either annually or biennially since its establishment in 2013. The prize promotes the contribution of non-conformist thinking to the British public debate by recognising individuals who have demonstrated independence, courage, and sacrifice through the ideas they have introduced, or stands they have taken.

Nominations for the prize are submitted through an online form by the public each year, with the shortlist and winner selected by a panel of judges. The judging panel is chaired by Ali Miraj, who founded the prize, with other judges including economist Vicky Pryce, businessman and winner of the inaugural prize Michael Woodford, journalist Izabella Kaminska, and politician Gawain Towler.

== The prize: "The Three Politicians" ==
"The Three Politicians" was originally created in 2007 by Italian pop art sculptor, Maruro Perucchetti, and donated by him in recognition of the inaugural prize awarded in March 2013.

The pigmented urethane resin sculpture illustrates the "three politicians" in the form of the three wise monkeys – one who does not see, one who does not speak, and one who does not hear.

== List of shortlisted candidates and prize winners ==
=== 2013 Contrarian Prize ===
The shortlist for the inaugural prize was announced in February 2013, and the prize was presented by Isabel Oakeshott on 18 March 2013.

- Michael Woodford – winner
- Giles Fraser
- Nigel Farage
- Heather Brooke
- Peter Tatchell

=== 2014 Contrarian Prize ===
The 2014 prize was awarded on 2 April 2014.

- Clive Stafford Smith – winner
- Benjamin Zephaniah
- Brian Cathcart
- Douglas Carswell
- Kay Sheldon
- Peter Oborne

Presented by: Will Hutton

=== 2015 Contrarian Prize ===
The shortlist for the 2015 prize was announced in June 2015, and the prize was presented by Jonathan Dimbleby on 18 June 2015.

- Simon Danczuk – winner
- Craig Murray
- Ed Husain
- George Galloway
- Nevres Kemal

=== 2017 Contrarian Prize ===
The 2017 prize was presented by Sir Simon Jenkins on 16 May 2017.

- Patrick Minford – winner
- Gisela Stuart
- Narindar Saroop
- Faith Spear
- Nigel Farage

=== 2019 Contrarian Prize ===
The shortlist for the 2019 prize was announced in June 2019, and the prize was presented by Jeremy Paxman on 25 June 2019.

- Katharine Birbalsingh – winner
- Theresa May
- Douglas Murray
- David Goodhart
- Helen Pluckrose

=== 2021 Contrarian Prize ===
The shortlist for the 2021 prize was announced in October 2021, and the prize was presented by Michael Crick on 11 November 2021.

- Toby Young – winner
- Suzanne Moore
- Will Knowland
- Sunetra Gupta

=== 2024 Contrarian Prize ===
The shortlist for the 2024 prize was announced on 7 October 2024 recognising five whistleblowers. The prize was presented by Adam Boulton on 23 October 2024.

- Maggie Oliver – winner
- Elizabeth Nicholl
- David Neal
- Stephen Cresswell
- David Bell

== Lectures ==
Following the prize-giving ceremony, an event is held in conjunction with Cass Business School typically in the form of a lecture or discussion featuring the winner of that year's prize.

Date	Speaker(s)	Title
20 November 2013	Michael Woodford	How do we achieve a more moral capitalism?
19 November 2014	Clive Stafford Smith	The long path to injustice
2 December 2015	Simon Danczuk MP	Hiding in plain sight: how child sexual abusers get away with it
30 November 2016	Panel debate: Claire Fox (chair), Ed Husain, Izabella Kaminska, Giesla Stuart, Peter Tatchell, Simon Wessely	Contrarianism in an age of conformity
5 December 2018	Professor Patrick Minford	Brexit and beyond
25 November 2020	Katharine Birbalsingh CBE	Against the grain: how a brave headteacher spearheaded an educational revolution
19 October 2022	Panel debate: Claire Fox (chair), Michael Crick, Sunetra Gupta, André Spicer, Peter Tatchell	Is it becoming impossible to be a contrarian?
1 November 2023	Toby Young	Freedom of Speech and Censorship: Examining the Tensions Between Open Discourse and Harmful Content

== See also ==
- Mais Lecture
- The Business School (formerly Cass)
