= List of University of Oxford people in business =

This is a list of people from the University of Oxford involved from the world of business. Many were students at one (or more) of the colleges of the University, and others held fellowships at a college.

This list forms part of a series of lists of people associated with the University of Oxford – for other lists, please see the main article List of University of Oxford people.

== List ==
- Jihan Abass (Lami Insurance Technology and Griffin Insurance)
- Goga Ashkenazi (Somerville)
- Waldorf Astor, 2nd Viscount Astor (New College)
- William Astor, 3rd Viscount Astor (New College)
- Grace Beverley (St Peter's)
- Ananya Birla
- Count Gottfried von Bismarck (Christ Church)
- Christopher Bland
- Michael von Clemm (Corpus Christi and Templeton)
- Gavyn Davies (Balliol)
- Pete Dawkins (Brasenose)
- Warren East (Wadham)
- Rod Eddington (Lincoln)
- Mohamed A. El-Erian, CEO and CIO of PIMCO - a company of Allianz SE
- Josh Frydenberg (University)
- Sergio Ermotti, Swiss banker and Group CEO of UBS
- David Gordon
- Darius Guppy (Magdalen)
- David Hatendi (University College)
- Alfred Hayes (New College)
- Jonathan Hiscock
- Brent Hoberman (New College)
- Martin Jacomb (Worcester)
- Antony Jenkins, CEO of Barclays PLC
- Martha Lane Fox (Magdalen)
- Howard Marks (Balliol)
- Ian Maxwell
- Kevin Maxwell
- James Dou Kuo (New College) Member of TSB Bank 2014–17
- Frank Cecil Meyer (New College) Member of Parliament 1924–29
- John Montgomery-Cuninghame of Corsehill (Worcester)
- Michael Moritz (Christ Church)
- Alastair Morton (Worcester)
- Nicholas O'Shaughnessy (Keble)
- Angus Ogilvy (Trinity)
- Paul Pester, CEO of TSB Bank
- Randal Pinkett (Keble)
- Catherine Powell (Somerville), CEO Disney Parks, Western Region
- Jacob Rees-Mogg (Trinity) Conservative Party parliamentary candidate for North East Somerset
- Chris Rokos (Pembroke)
- Jacob Rothschild, 4th Baron Rothschild (Christ Church)
- Nathaniel Rothschild, 5th Baron Rothschild (Wadham)
- Dudley Danvers Granville Coutts Ryder, 7th Earl of Harrowby
- John Sainsbury, Baron Sainsbury of Preston Candover (Worcester)
- Tim Sainsbury (Worcester)
- Basil Sanderson, 1st Baron Sanderson of Ayot (Trinity)
- Guy Spier (Brasenose)
- John Templeton (Balliol)
- Shriti Vadera, Baroness Vadera (Somerville), Chairwoman of Santander UK
- Arthur Wellesley, Earl of Mornington (Christ Church)
- Philip Yea (Brasenose)
