= Fozia Irfan =

Fozia Tanvir Irfan
- Education: London School of Economics; Cass Business School
- Employer: Children in Need
- Honours: Order of the British Empire

Fozia Tanvir Irfan OBE is a Director of Children and Young People at Children in Need.

== Early life and education ==
Irfan was awarded a Bachelor of Laws (LLB) degree by the London School of Economics in 1996. As a solicitor, she "worked on employment discrimination practices." As a qualified solicitor, Irfan completed a Masters in Grantmaking, Philanthropy and Social Investment at Cass Business School.

== Career ==
A focus of her efforts at the foundation was improving diversity, equity and inclusion (DEI) in the charity sector. In particular, Irfan believes that philanthropy can bring about civic engagement and bridge social capital. Irfam leads the DEI coalition, an organisation established in 2020 which aims to address systemic inequality in UK foundations and charities. The thirteen foundations are the National Lottery Community Fund, Children in Need, Barrow Cadbury, Lloyds Bank Foundation, Paul Hamlyn Foundation, Friends Provident and the community foundations for Essex, Milton Keynes, Quartet, Wiltshire, Two Ridings and Leeds and Surrey. In October 2020 Irfan was appointed Director of Children and Young People at Children In Need.

Irfan is a member of the expert advisory panel for the Health Foundation's inquiry into the implications for health and health inequalities of the COVID-19 pandemic in the United Kingdom, which launched in October 2020. She called for funders to be more active in supporting communities of colour. In particular, Irfan was concerned about how the pandemic was impacting children and young people.

Irfan was awarded the rank of Officer of the Order of the British Empire in January 2021 for "services to the community in Bedfordshire, particularly during the Covid-19 response." Irfan serves on the Advisory Board of the National Lottery Community Fund, the "largest funder of community activity in the UK."
