= Nick Maughan =

Bahamian investor, philanthropist and conservationist

Nick Maughan CBE
- Born: January 1980 (age 46); London, England.
- Education: University of Manchester; Cass Business School
- Known for: investor, philanthropist

Nicholas Peter Collingwood Maughan CBE (born January 1980) is a British-born Bahamian investor and philanthropist. He founded the investment firm Maughan Capital and is chairman of the Geneva-based multi-family office Little Whale Capital. In 2020, he established the Nick Maughan Family Foundation (NMF), which supports projects in youth development, education, conservation and community infrastructure.

Maughan co-founded the youth boxing charity BoxWise and is founding chairman of the Bahamas Boxing Academy. In the 2024 Birthday Honours, he was appointed a Commander of the Order of the British Empire (CBE) for services to philanthropy.

== Early life and education ==
Maughan was born in London in January 1980 and grew up in south-west London. His mother was a teacher, and he initially considered following her into teaching. At school he practised boxing and judo and developed an interest in mathematics and computers.

He studied religion and theology at the University of Manchester, graduating with first-class honours, and later received an MSc in investment management from Cass Business School (now Bayes Business School) in 2004. While at university, he began trading online.

== Investment career ==
At 23, Maughan moved to New York, where he worked as a quantitative analyst and later director of research at Tamiso & Co., a quantitative trading firm. He later built software-development and quantitative teams in Eastern Europe, and in 2009 sold an options-pricing platform to IG Group.

In 2020, Maughan established Maughan Capital, a privately funded venture investment firm. He is also chairman of Geneva-based multi-family office Little Whale Capital.

== Philanthropy ==
In 2020, Maughan founded the Nick Maughan Family Foundation (NMF), which supports projects in education, the environment and community development.

=== Youth development through sport ===
Maughan co-founded BoxWise with Rick Ogden in 2020. The organisation provides free non-contact boxing programmes for disadvantaged young people, combining boxing with mentoring and pathways into further education or employment. In 2024, Maughan committed £1 million to BoxWise as part of its partnership with Frank Warren's Queensberry Promotions.

Maughan formerly served as a trustee of Dallaglio RugbyWorks and is a trustee of the Centre for Social Justice Foundation.

=== The Bahamas ===
Maughan founded the Bahamas Boxing Academy in 2025 and serves as its chairman. The youth boxing organisation in Nassau was established with support from the Bahamian government and combines boxing training with mentoring and educational support for young people. Maughan funded the reconstruction of its facilities at the Baillou Hills Sporting Complex. The rebuilt academy complex opened in April 2026. By 2026, his total funding for Bahamian boxing had exceeded US$3 million.

=== Conservation and international development ===
Maughan has been a trustee of Tusk Trust, a wildlife conservation charity working across Africa, since 2021. Through NMF, he committed £1 million over five years to support the charity's Conservation Awards.

Through NMF, Maughan has also funded health and education projects in eastern Uganda in partnership with Spotlight on Africa, including the Nick Maughan Maternity Centre in Mbale, a 100-bed facility providing maternity and neonatal care.

== Honours ==
Maughan was appointed a Commander of the Order of the British Empire (CBE) in the 2024 Birthday Honours for services to philanthropy.
