= Alan Mais, Baron Mais =

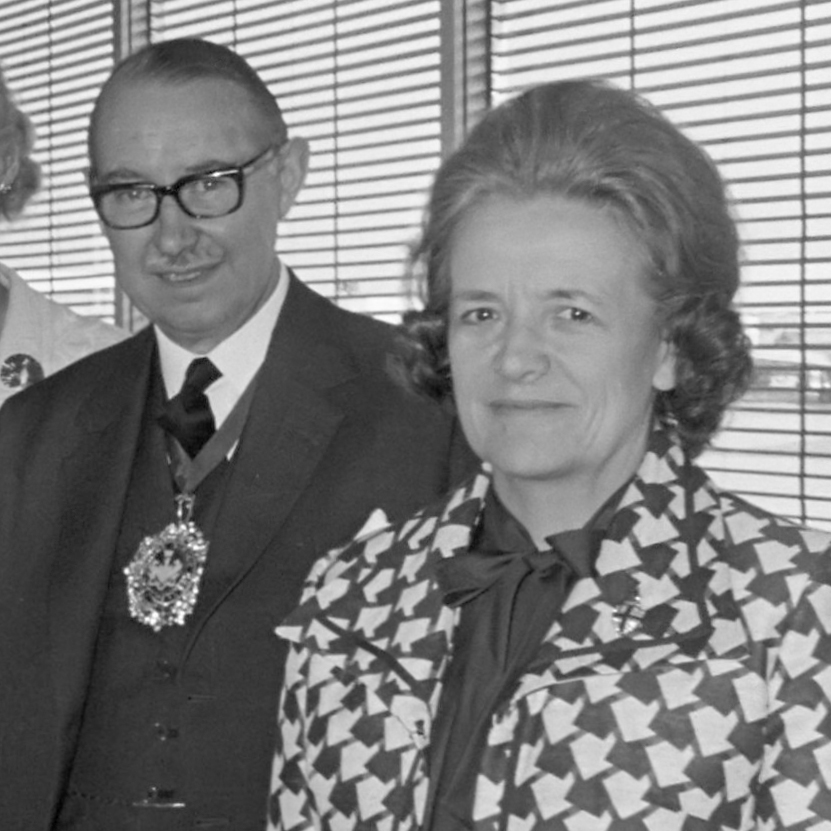
The Lord Mayor of London and Lady Mais (1973)

Alan Raymond Mais, Baron Mais, (7 July 1911 – 28 November 1993) was a Labour Party Life peer and Lord Mayor of the City of London for 1972–1973.

== Early life ==
Born in Southampton, the only child of Ernest Mais, a Master Mariner, he was educated at Banister Court School, Hampshire, before attending the College of Estate Management, where he trained as a surveyor.

Mais worked for engineers Richard Costain and Parker Construction before setting up his own consulting practice.

== Military service ==
During World War II Mais served as a major with Special Forces in France, Iran and Iraq. After returning to Britain late in 1943, his orders were to develop the Mulberry harbour project for the D-Day landings.

When construction began off the Normandy coast immediately after D-day (6 June 1944) Mais, promoted lieutenant-colonel, was in charge of constructing the pierheads and floating roadways at the British harbour under Colonel Stuart Gilbert of the Royal Engineers, who commanded the port construction force.

He then joined the Canadians in the advance to the Rhine and, promoted full colonel, became deputy chief engineer at Antwerp.

== Career ==
After the War, Mais joined contractors Trollope & Colls, becoming joint-managing director and chairman in 1963 and retiring in 1968 when the firm was taken over by Trafalgar House.

Created a Life Peer by Harold Wilson in 1967, he took the title Baron Mais, of Walbrook in the City of London, before sitting in the House of Lords on the Labour, then Liberal and Liberal Democrats benches.

Lord Mais was admitted as a Freeman of the City of London, becoming Master of the Cutlers' Company and then of the Paviors' Company. He also served as Alderman for the Walbrook Ward from 1963, as Sheriff of London for 1969–70, before being elected as Lord Mayor of London in 1972, the first peer to serve concurrently in that office. He was also HM Lieutenant of the City, a Justice of the Peace and from 1976 Deputy Lieutenant for the County of Kent.

In February 1978, a series of lectures was initiated bearing his name, with Gordon Richardson, then Governor of the Bank of England, providing the inaugural lecture. The annual Mais Lecture was regarded as a leading event in the banking and financial community of the City of London, having hosted each of the subsequent Governors of the Bank of England, as well as Prime Ministers, Chancellors of the Exchequer, and European Central Bankers.

== Personal life ==
In 1936 Mais married Lorna Aline, daughter of Stanley Aspinall Boardman, wool merchant, of Addiscombe in Surrey, by whom he had two sons and a daughter.

Coat of arms of Alan Mais, Baron Mais

Crest
A demi-sea Horse per pale Argent and Gules finned Or the dexter Fin grasping a Sword Gules and resting the sinister upon an Anchor flukes to the sinister Sable.
Escutcheon
Per pale Argent and Gules a Chevron engrailed between in chief two Cinquefoils and in base a Rose all Counterchanged on a Chief Azure a Griffin passant Or supporting with the dexter Claw a paving Stone Argent.
Supporters
Dexter a Griffin, sinister a Dragon, both Gules armed and langued Azure winged Argent and gorged with a collar embattled Argent charged with a barrulet wavy Azure.
Motto
In Neminem Perfidus

Civic offices
| Preceded by Sir Edward Howard | Lord Mayor of London; 1972–1973 | Succeeded by Sir Hugh Wontner |
