= Charles Major =

Charles Major may refer to:

- Charles Major (writer) (1856–1913), American lawyer and novelist
- Charles Beautron Major (1875–1966), Canadian lawyer, judge and politician
- Charles E. Major (1859–1954), New Zealand politician of the Liberal Party
- Charles Henry Major (1860–1933), British judge
- Charles Immanuel Forsyth Major (1843–1923), Scottish-born Swiss physician, zoologist and palaeontologist
- Charles W. Major (1904–1984), Bahamian high jumper
- Charlie Major (born 1954), Canadian country music singer
