= Ali Miraj =

British DJ, accountant, and political candidate

- Born: October 1974 (age 51–52); Hillingdon, London, England
- Education: Haberdashers' Boys' School
- Alma mater: London School of Economics
- Occupations: Chartered accountant; infrastructure financier, part-time DJ
- Employer: ING Group
- Known for: Conservative Party parliamentary candidate: Aberavon 2001; Watford 2005
- Notable work: Contrarian Prize
- Board member of: Cass Business School Strategy Board 2015–present; Campaign to Protect Rural England 2009–2014; UK Friends of The Abraham Fund Initiatives 2009–2013

Mohammad Ali Miraj (born 31 October 1974) is a British former Conservative Party parliamentary candidate, chartered accountant, and part-time DJ from London.

== Political career ==
Miraj became a Conservative councillor for Ruislip Manor in the 1998 Hillingdon London Borough Council election aged 23, when he was working as a part-time DJ. He was a councillor until the 2002 election.

In 2001, after the September 11 attacks, Miraj spoke at the 2001 Conservative Party conference in favour of military action in Afghanistan, saying: "As a British Muslim I find the [11 September] attacks even more difficult to bear". In 2003, when he was in Conservative Future, he supported ID cards being introduced to prevent benefit fraud, but was opposed to random checks. Miraj was a foreign affairs advisor to the Conservative Party from 2001 to 2003; he opposed the 2003 Iraq War, against his party line. He appeared on a Newsnight debate in 2006 about the Middle East during the Lebanon war.

=== Parliamentary candidate ===
Miraj was the candidate for Aberavon in the 2001 General Election, coming fourth with 2,296 votes (7.6%). He was the only ethnic minority candidate standing in Wales, when he was described as "a bit of a character, doing passable imitations of then leader William Hague". He also was on the shortlist for Wellingborough in 2003.

He was the candidate for Watford in the 2005 General Election, a marginal seat, coming third with 14,634 (29.6%); The Almanac of British Politics said he "did well not to be squeezed by the other two" main party candidates and journalist David Aaronovitch called him a "young, energetic DJ with an excellent website and a nimble way with policy". During the campaign, Miraj noted that "Muslims are not the flavour of the month right now and we have a massive PR job to do." He said some voters told him they would not vote for him because he was a Muslim.

Miraj applied for three seats with vacancies where MPs were retiring in 2010, including Witham in Essex, but felt blocked because of his race, saying that Conservative MP Bernard Jenkin told him, "Good luck, Ali, but I would be shocked if they didn't pick a white, middle-class male", which Jenkin denied. In the end, Priti Patel was selected; as an Asian woman this went against Miraj's prediction, but he commented, "This is a bright day for the party and indicative of progress." Miraj was on the candidate list for Watford for the 2010 general election, with commentator Martin Bright calling him "an obvious choice for Cameron's A-list", but Miraj was dropped from the list in July 2007. Although he had been part of party leader David Cameron's 2005 leadership campaign, and was on Conservative policy review boards, including that for International and National Security, he criticised Cameron after the party came third in two by-elections, saying, "I'm disillusioned because I think substance has been replaced by PR". Miraj was suspended as a candidate the next day; Cameron said Miraj had asked him for a peerage the same day as his criticism, which Miraj said was a smear, because Cameron had called the meeting.

== Professional career ==
Miraj has worked as an auditor and an accountant for an investment bank. He worked in syndicated finance and became director of infrastructure finance at ING Group in 2014. He was a trustee of the Campaign to Protect Rural England from July 2009 to June 2014, and on the board of the UK Friends of The Abraham Fund Initiatives from May 2009 to February 2013. In addition, he is a liveryman of The Worshipful Company of International Bankers and Master 2026-7.

== Personal life ==
Miraj's family comes from Pakistan, and he is a Muslim; he opposes radicalism and supports freedom of speech. He attended Haberdashers' Aske's Boys' School in Elstree and then the London School of Economics. He lives in Bow, London.

When working as an auditor at Ministry of Sound in the late 1990s, he became interested in house music and attended a course at Point Blank DJ School in Hoxton. He has worked as a part-time DJ since the early 2000s. From February 2014, he has run the monthly Decks and the City night in Shoreditch at The Horse and Groom; former footballer Glenn Helder played at the first night. Joe Bish of Vice said of the night "This may just be the most reprehensible thing I've ever written about ... [an] example of total, unmitigated, unwavering, unashamed cuntery".

Ali Miraj hosts radio shows on LBC Radio from 12-3PM on Saturdays and Sundays.

== Contrarian prize ==
Miraj founded and runs the annual Contrarian Prize, awarded to Michael Woodford in 2013, Clive Stafford Smith in 2014 and Simon Danczuk in 2015.
