= Bahamas Boxing Academy =

Boxing and youth centre in Nassau, Bahamas

- Formation: 2025
- Founder: Nick Maughan
- Type: Nonprofit organization
- Purpose: Boxing training and youth development
- Headquarters: Celery Drive, Queen Elizabeth Sports Centre, Nassau, The Bahamas
- Affiliations: BoxWise
- Website: bahamasboxingacademy.com

Bahamas Boxing Academy is a non-profit boxing gym and youth centre at the Queen Elizabeth Sports Centre in Nassau, The Bahamas. The Bahamas Boxing Academy was established in 2025, with the endorsement of the Bahamian government, to revive boxing in the country, and officaly opened in April 2026 by Prime Minister Philip Davis. It is chaired by its founder, the Bahamian investor Nick Maughan, and works with the British youth boxing charity BoxWise. The Academy trains and mentors young people from New Providence and the Family Islands. Charles III visited it in October 2026 during his Caribbean tour.

== History ==
The academy originated when Prime Minister Philip Davis approached Maughan, the founder of BoxWise, about establishing a facility for local young people. The project was led by BoxWise co-founder, Rick Ogden, who said that it would bring the charity's model to The Bahamas and expand upon it. Privately funded and endorsed by Davis and the Bahamian government, it serves the fuel purpose of reviving boxing in the country to produce more Olympic and professional boxers and to provide community and youth services. Work on the site started in July 2025.

Plans made public in August and September 2025 were for a "National Boxing Gym" built in phases, with three boxing arenas, an outdoor gym and community social and learning spaces. It hosts national and regional competitions and offers academic help, nutrition advice, mental-health support and life-skills training alongside boxing. In September 2025, the Minister of Youth, Sports and Culture, Mario Bowleg, said that Maughan had personally committed more than one million dollars.

The academy formally opened in April 2026. On 28 October that year, Charles III visited the academy, watched children training and older boxers sparring, and joined Davis in unveiling a commemorative plaque.

== Facilities and programmes ==
The academy occupies two newly renovated buildings on Celery Drive at the Queen Elizabeth Sports Centre, in the Yellow Elder area of Nassau. One is named after the British boxing promoter Frank Warren, who chairs BoxWise's development board. Alongside its boxing areas, it has homework rooms and a computer centre. The site also has separate gyms for juniors and seniors, a kitchen providing free meals and dormitories for young people from the Family Islands.

The academy trains boys and girls aged eight to eighteen and was established to offer local young people mentoring and education alongside sport. Its coaching team is led by Valentino Knowles and Kieshno Major, former boxers for the Bahamian national team.

In August 2026 the Ministry of Youth and Sports held a five-day summer camp at the academy for 75 young people. Later that month the academy opened enrolment for its free Young Champions Afterschool Programme, advertised as combining boxing with homework help, tutoring for national examinations, mentoring and life-skills sessions.

== See also ==
- Boxing in the Bahamas
