= GSA Capital =

British quantitative investment firm

GSA Capital Partners LLP

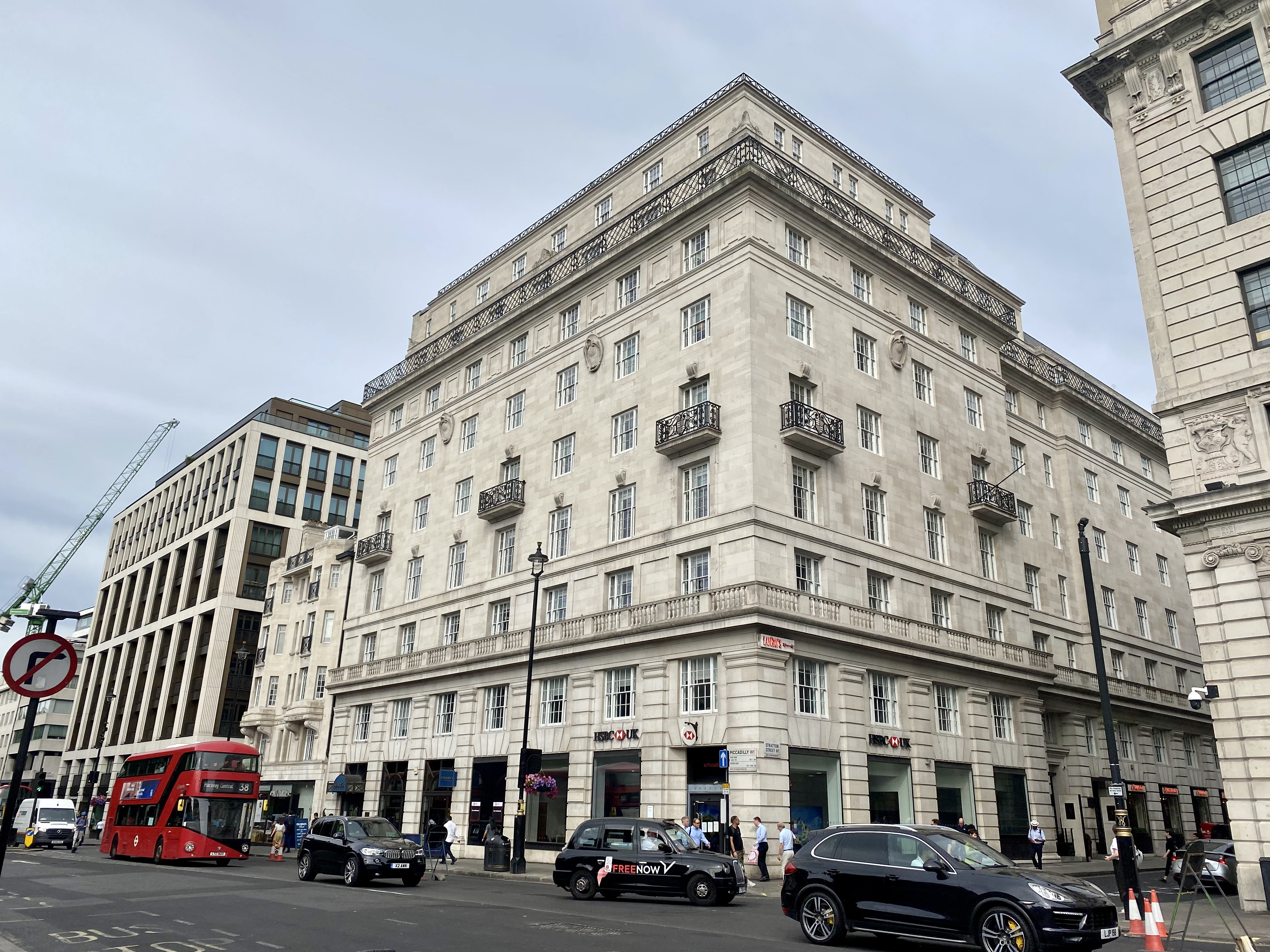
- Headquarters at Stratton House in London
- Type: Privately held company
- Industry: Financial services
- Founded: 2005; 21 years ago
- Founder: Jonathan Hiscock
- Headquarters: London, United Kingdom
- Key people: David Khabie-Zeitoune (CEO)
- Products: Investment management Quantitative finance Systematic trading
- AUM: US$2.7 billion (2022)
- Number of employees: 120 (2022)
- Website: www.gsacapital.com

GSA Capital (GSA) is a British quantitative finance investment firm. It focuses on systematic trading across equity, futures, and foreign exchange markets globally. It was previously a hedge fund before transitioning to become a private trading firm in 2021 to focus on better performing strategies.

The firm is headquartered in London with an additional office in New York.

== Background ==
GSA was founded in 2005 by Jonathan Hiscock, a former proprietary trader from Deutsche Bank. Hiscock was Head of the Global Statistical arbitrage team at Deutsche Bank and took his team of 15 staff to set up GSA. It was set up as a long/short equity hedge fund. David Khabie-Zeitoune, a former trader at Brevan Howard was hired to be its CEO.

In 2013, GSA launched its $1.7 billion Trend following fund that only charged a 0.5% flat management fee compared to norms of hedge funds that charged a 2% management fee and a 20% performance fee. Initially it invested in conventional markets such as currencies, bonds and equities and later on moved into alternative investments such as interest rate swaps.

In 2015, XTX Markets was spun out of GSA.

In January 2016, GSA split its £110 million profit among its staff.

In July 2019, Financial Times reported that GSA had created “Alpha Capture” programme that imported human intuition into its algorithmic trading models. GSA also set up an internal “TradeLab” for deeper parsing of the data, hiring a few of the traders and salespeople as non-quant “discretionary” portfolio managers.

In October 2021, GSA stated it would be investing in cryptocurrencies.

In November 2021, GSA announced it would transition from a hedge fund to a private trading firm to focus on better performing strategies as well as returns and would return capital to external investors.

Since 2010, the firm had only hired 25 out of 5,000 applicants. Many of its employees have PhDs in mathematics.

== Disputes ==
=== Thomson Reuters ===
Lucid Markets, a rival high-frequency trading firm broke Thomson Reuters' trading system rules by hooking up several servers to the platform at once which allowed Lucid Markets to obtain vital trading data just ahead of its competitors. In response Thomson Reuters briefly suspended Lucid Markets in December 2012. However, GSA stated the suspension was not severe enough and protested by refusing to post prices of its trades on Thomson Reuters' system.

=== Citadel Securities ===
In December 2019, Citadel Securities sued GSA for $40 million over claims it obtained a secret trading strategy from Vedat Cologlu, a senior trader at Citadel Securities who it attempted to recruit while using texts and WhatsApp messages to hide all traces of the plan. Citadel Securities also wanted to block GSA from using the trading strategy. According to Citadel Securities, the automated trading model known as the ABC Strategy cost it $100 million to develop and only 15 of its 3,000 employees had access to it. It was generating over $50 million a year trading stocks in the U.S. and Europe. GSA stated there was nothing in the trading strategy that would enable it to reverse engineer the trading model. GSA also bought a counterclaim alleging Citadel Securities had acted hypocritically when it attempted to hire one of GSA's traders in 2019 and sought accounting data from him.

In June 2021, the two parties reached a settlement out of court for all the claims which ended the lawsuit. Cologlu said in an email he signed a confidential settlement with Citadel Securities "with no admission of liability on my part."
