= James Leigh-Pemberton =

British banker (born 1956)

The Honourable Sir James Leigh-Pemberton CVO
- Born: 10 December 1956 (age 69)
- Occupation: Banker
- Parents: Robin Leigh-Pemberton, Baron Kingsdown (father); Rosemary Davina Forbes (mother)

Sir James Henry Leigh-Pemberton CVO (born 10 December 1956) is a British banker who served as the Receiver-General for the Duchy of Cornwall from 2000 to 2022. He served as the executive chairman of UK Financial Investments until 2018 when the government owned company was closed.

Leigh-Pemberton is the son of former Governor of the Bank of England and life peer Robin Leigh-Pemberton, Baron Kingsdown, and Rosemary Davina Forbes, OBE, only daughter of Lt Col David Walter Arthur William Forbes MC, and stepdaughter of David Cecil, 6th Marquess of Exeter. He was educated at Eton and Christ Church, Oxford. He started his career at S. G. Warburg & Co. before becoming a Managing Director at Credit Suisse, Investment Banking in London. On 7 July 2008, he was appointed CEO of Credit Suisse's businesses in the UK.

James Leigh-Pemberton is also a trustee of the Duke of Cornwall Benevolent fund and the Royal Collection Trust.

He was appointed Commander of the Royal Victorian Order (CVO) in the 2013 Birthday Honours. He was knighted in the 2019 New Year Honours.
