= Obliquity (book) =

Book by John Kay

Obliquity:Why our goals are best achieved indirectly
- Author: John Kay
- Genre: Business
- Publisher: Profile
- Publication date: 25 March 2010

Obliquity: Why our goals are best achieved indirectly is a book by economist John Kay. It was inspired by an observation of the successful pharmaceutical researcher, Sir James Black:

I used to tell my colleagues that if they wanted to make money, there were many easier ways to do it than drug research. How wrong could I have been! In business as in science, it seems that you are often most successful in achieving something when you are trying to do something else. I think of it as the principle of ‘obliquity’.

— James Black

The theme of the book is that businesses and other enterprises are best run by enthusiasts who pursue excellence in their speciality. Financial success then follows from this. But, if financial goals are instead made the primary objective, the business will then lose its vigour and may fail.
