= Leslie O'Brien, Baron O'Brien of Lothbury =

Governor of the Bank of England (1908–1995)

The Right Honourable The Lord O'Brien of Lothbury GBE PC
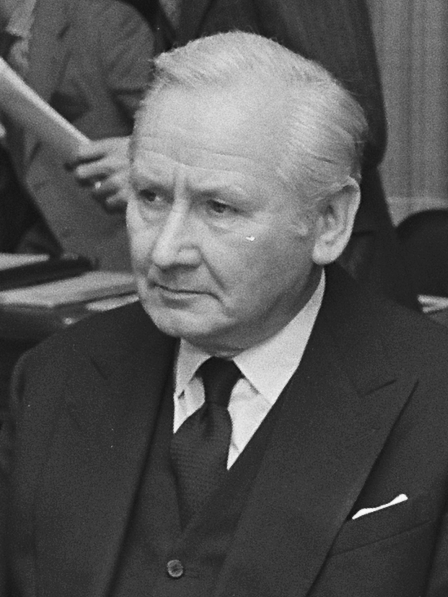
- O'Brien in 1973

Governor of the Bank of England
- In office 1 July 1966 – 30 June 1973
- Preceded by: The Earl of Cromer
- Succeeded by: Gordon Richardson

Personal details
- Born: Leslie Kenneth O'Brien; 8 February 1908 Dulwich, London
- Died: 24 November 1995 (aged 87) Redhill, Surrey, England
- Resting place: Tandridge, Surrey, England
- Spouse(s): Isabelle Pickett (m. 1932; died 1987) Marjorie Taylor (m. 1989)
- Occupation: Banker

Leslie Kenneth O'Brien, Baron O'Brien of Lothbury GBE PC (8 February 1908 – 24 November 1995) was Governor of the Bank of England.

After attending Wandsworth Grammar School in London, he joined the Bank of England in 1927 and rose through the ranks, becoming chief cashier in 1955, deputy governor in 1966, before serving as governor from 1966 until 1973. As governor, O'Brien presided over the devaluation of the pound in 1967. In 1974 he was appointed as a director of The Rank Organisation.

He became a Knight Grand Cross of the Order of the British Empire in 1967 and was appointed to the Privy Council in 1970. Following his retirement as governor in 1973 he was created a life peer as Baron O'Brien of Lothbury, of the City of London.

He married firstly Isabelle Pickett (1908–1987) in 1932, and secondly Marjorie Taylor (1923–2017) in 1989. He died in Tandridge, Surrey, in 1995.

== Arms ==
Coat of arms of Leslie O'Brien, Baron O'Brien of Lothbury
Coronet A Coronet of a Baron Crest In front of two Keys in saltire Azure a Needle point downwards proper threaded Gules Escutcheon Gules bezanty three lions passant guardant in pale each per pale Or and Argent Supporters On either side a Lion guardant per fess Or and Argent in the mouth a Key Or standing upon a Heap of Coins Or and Argent Motto Calm in Adversity

== Footnotes ==
Government offices
Preceded by The Earl of Cromer	Governor of the Bank of England; 1966–1973	Succeeded by Gordon Richardson
