= Sonya Barlow =

Pakistani-British entrepreneur

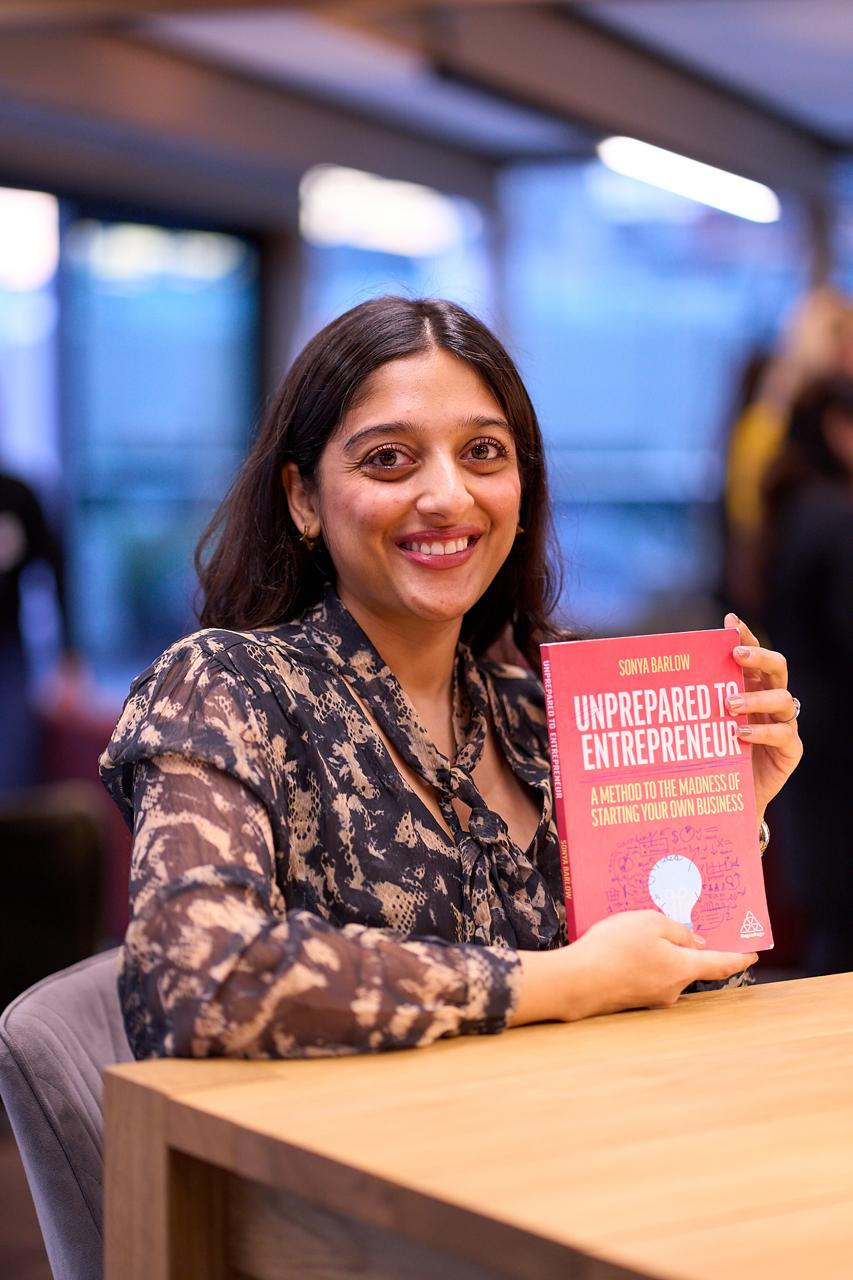
- Sonya Barlow, Author & Entrepreneur, with Unprepared To Entrepreneur Business Book
- Born: 1992 (age 33–34); Pakistan
- Citizenship: British
- Education: Cass Business School
- Occupations: Entrepreneur, motivational speaker, author, content creator, presenter
- Title: CEO, Author & Motivational Speaker. Founder of diversity, equity and inclusion (DEI) consultancy LMF Network, Author of Unprepared to Entrepreneur and BBC Presenter.
- Movement: Technology
- Website: https://www.sonyabarlow.co.uk/

Sonya Barlow (born 1992) is a British technology entrepreneur, author, and broadcaster. She is the founder and chief executive officer of the Like Minded Females (LMF) Network, a careers platform and diversity, equity and inclusion consultancy.

Barlow was born in Pakistan and raised in England. She studied business at Bayes Business School and graduated in 2015. She is a former presenter on the BBC Asian Network, where she hosted The Everyday Hustle, which won Best Radio Show at the Asian Media Awards in 2022.

She is the author of Unprepared to Entrepreneur, which was runner-up at the Business Book Awards in 2023. In 2025, she announced a second business book with Bloomsbury, focusing on the future of work, business networking, and human relationships in the digital era.

== Early life and education ==
Sonya Barlow was born in October 1992 in Pakistan. She moved to England at the age of three and grew up in Langley, Berkshire (UK). She attended Herschel Grammar School before studying at Bayes Business School, where she earned a Bachelor of Science in Business Studies in 2015. She also studied communication at Luis University in Rome during her placement year.

== Career ==
After graduating, Barlow began her career in the technology sector as a data analyst. She worked on projects related to big data, financial technology, and digital transformation with organisations including Dunnhumby, O2, Lloyds Banking Group, and Volkswagen. During this period, she has spoken publicly about a lack of representation and accessible professional networks for women and minority professionals in the technology industry, which later influenced her decision to establish her own organisation.

In 2017, Barlow received the Rising Star Award from We Are The City in the Sales category. In 2018, she founded the Like Minded Females (LMF) Network and became its chief executive officer. Her work has since been recognised by industry organisations, including being named one of the Most Influential Women in Tech by Computer Weekly and a Women in Software Changemaker by Makers and Google.

Barlow has delivered two TED talks, including Failure Comes Before Resilience (2020). She has also spoken at industry events such as Big Data LDN and was included in the Inspiring Fifty Europe list in 2020, recognising women in the technology sector.

In 2021, Barlow collaborated with Rens Original to write, direct, and produce the short film I’m Done, released to mark International Women's Day.

Barlow launched the podcast Strategically Winging It in 2020, later renamed The Sonya Barlow Show. She has contributed commentary and opinion pieces on technology, careers, and diversity to publications including Metro UK, the BBC, The Guardian, and LinkedIn.

In 2021, she published her first book, Unprepared to Entrepreneur: A Method to the Madness of Starting Your Own Business, which explores barriers to entrepreneurship. She also hosted the BBC Asian Network programme The Everyday Hustle, which won Best Radio Show at the Asian Media Awards in 2022. She departed the programme in 2024 following schedule changes at the network.

== Public speaking and recognition ==
Barlow has delivered keynote speeches and workshops on topics including technology, diversity, and inclusion at professional forums and industry events. She has been featured in independent press coverage for her speaking engagements and contributions to discussions on career development and inclusion.

In 2021, she participated in the Monki "Salute Sisterhood" campaign, which highlighted gender equality efforts in a public forum.

Her work has also been recognised in editorial lists of influential women in technology, including Marie Claire's Future Shapers and the Top 50 Women in Tech compiled by industry media.

== Like Minded Females (LMF) Network ==
In 2018, Barlow founded the Like Minded Females Network (LMF Network) as a professional community for women working in technology. The organisation later expanded into a diversity, equity and inclusion consultancy and careers platform, delivering workshops, mentorship schemes, and leadership programmes for professionals and organisations.

== Selected publications ==
- "We Don't Need Your Empty Gestures; We Need Action," Sifted (2020).
- "Can We Trust Machines to Predict the Stock Market with 100% Accuracy?" Metro (2019).
- Opinion articles for The Telegraph (2021).
