= Robert P. Kelly =

Robert P. Kelly (born 1954) is the former CEO of The Bank of New York Mellon. Robert Kelly grew up in Nova Scotia, and went to Saint Mary's University in Halifax. After getting an MBA at Bayes Business School, he spent 19 years at Toronto-Dominion Bank. He joined First Union as chief financial officer in 2000 and played a key role in its merger with Wachovia. He then moved to Mellon Financial in February 2006. When Mellon merged with the Bank of New York in 2007 he became CEO of the new company The Bank of New York Mellon.
