= The Truth About Markets =

2003 book by John Kay

The Truth About Markets: Why Some Nations are Rich but Most Remain Poor
- First edition
- Author: John Kay
- Genre: Economics
- Publisher: Allen Lane
- Publication date: 1 May 2003
- ISBN: 9780140296723

The Truth About Markets: Why Some Nations are Rich but Most Remain Poor is a book by economist John Kay, published in 2003 by Allen Lane.

== Plot ==
The Truth About Markets looks at why market economies performed better than socialist or centrally directed ones. The book looks at markets in a number of different settings around the world.
