= Peter Cullum =

English businessman (born 1950)

- Born: Peter Geoffrey Cullum; September 1950 (age 75); Norwich, Norfolk, England
- Occupations: Businessman; philanthropist

Peter Geoffrey Cullum CBE (born 1950) is a British businessman and philanthropist. He previously served as the executive chairman of Towergate Partnership until April 2015.

== Early life ==
Peter Geoffrey Cullum was born in September 1950 in Norwich, Norfolk, England. In his youth, Cullum played for the Norwich City boys team and was a regular spectator at Carrow Road from the 1950s.

== Career ==
Cullum began his insurance career in 1969 with the Royal Insurance Group and progressed to sales and marketing positions within Commercial Union and ITT London and Edinburgh where he became marketing director in 1988. At the age of 21, he became the youngest person to pass the Chartered Insurance Institute fellowship examinations. In 1991, Cullum joined Economic Insurance and led their return to profitability in 1993. In December 1993, he led the management buyout of Economic Insurance that was sold in 1995 to Hiscox plc. He joined Hiscox as group marketing director, a role he held until he left in 1997 to create Towergate Underwriting Group. By 2010, his personal fortune was reportedly worth £1.7bn.

=== Norwich City F.C. ===
In 2008, Cullum offered Norwich City F.C. £20m, in return for becoming the majority shareholder. In November 2008, Cullum stated his determination not to ""just stand by as a spectator" if Norwich City was on the financial brink." He also expressed his admiration for what Delia Smith and Michael Wynn-Jones have achieved at the club:

"the two of them have been brilliant for Norwich City - and I've always said that. Every home and away game they are there. They've put a lot of their own personal wealth into this. If you happen to be Abramovich and you have stuck £10m into Norwich City, it's an accounting entry that barely covers the cost of a holiday. But here are two people who have put in a considerable amount of their total wealth. So I feel it's disappointing if they are now being seen by some as the devil incarnate. It's unkind and it's unfair."

== Philanthropy ==
He has established the Cullum Family Trust Scholarships at the Cass Business School in London, which gives scholarships of £10,000 to two MBA or MSc students every year. As a result, he was awarded an honorary doctorate of Science in Entrepreneurship by the school in 2007.

He was appointed Commander of the Order of the British Empire (CBE) in the 2011 New Year Honours for services to business and charity.
