= Tusk Trust =

British nonprofit organization

- Founded: 1990; 36 years ago
- Founder: Charles Mayhew OBE
- Type: Charity
- Registration no.: 1186533
- Location: Dorset
- Revenue: £14,244,498 (2022)
- Staff: 13 (December 2022)
- Website: tusk.org

Tusk Trust is a British non-profit organisation set up in 1990 to advance wildlife conservation across Africa. The charity funds the protection of African elephant, African rhinoceros and African lion, along with many other threatened species across Africa. Tusk’s mission is to amplify the impact of progressive conservation initiatives across Africa.

== History ==
Tusk Trust was established in 1990 in response to the 'poaching crisis' that was widespread in Africa during the 1980s. At that time, poaching was so rampant that it almost led to the extinction of elephant populations in many parts of Africa.

The Tusk Trust was founded by Charles Mayhew OBE, who was the Chief Executive until January 2024, when he was appointed to the role of Founder & President. Nicholas Bubb was recruited as the new Chief Executive in January 2024 having previously worked as Global Business Development Director at Fauna & Flora International. In 2020, Alexander Rhodes succeeded Stephen Watson as Chairman of the Tusk Board, which is supported by the Tusk Development Board.

Since 2005, Prince William has been a Royal Patron of the organization. The Prince continues to take a very active interest in the work of the charity and has undertaken a number of trips to Africa to see its work firsthand.

Tusk is a member of the Princes' Charities Forum, an initiative started by Prince William and Prince Harry in 2006 as a way of bringing together their charitable interests to develop synergies between the 20 or so organisations they support.

== Projects ==
=== Environmental protection in Africa ===
Tusk has supported many project across Africa. One of them is the Big Life Foundation, which focuses on preserving the wildlife and habitats of the Amboseli-Tsavo-Kilimanjaro ecosystem in East Africa. Tusk assisted Big Life in establishing a comprehensive patrol network.

Tusk also supports charity organization Blue Ventures focused on nurturing locally led marine conservation and rebuilding tropical fisheries with coastal communities.

Tusk Trust sponsored the Cheetah Conservation Fund, which has been collaborating with farmers in the Eastern Communal Conservancies of Namibia to test a new Human-Wildlife Conflict (HWC) mitigation tool - the E-Shepherd Collar. This tool aims to deter would-be predators giving chase.

Another supported organization is Conservation Through Public Health that promotes gorilla conservation among local communities by improving healthcare and economic opportunities.

Tusk Trust also supports Grévy's Zebra Trust helping endangered Grévy's zebra, Lewa Wildlife Conservancy working at conservation of wildlife and its habitat, Lilongwe Wildlife Centre aiming to protect Malawi’s wildlife, Okapi Conservation Project, Painted Dog Conservation, Botswana Wild Dog Research Project, Tsavo Trust, Honeyguide Foundation.

=== Lewa Safari Marathon ===
Tusk is co-organiser of the annual Lewa Safari Marathon across the 42,000 km^{2} of the Lewa Conservancy in Kenya, about 140 miles (230 km) north of Nairobi. The marathon annually draws around 1,400 runners from 30 countries, raising $500,000. Supporters include Eliud Kipchoge and Geoffrey Kamworor.

=== Tusk Rhino Trail ===
The Tusk Rhino Trail was a London-wide art installation held in London between August and September 2018. It celebrated the magnificence of the rhino, and highlighted the severe threat of poaching to their survival. Each rhino was specially designed, decorated and embellished by internationally renowned artists. The sculptures were on display from 20 August until World Rhino Day on 22 September. They will be auctioned by the leading London auction house, Christie's, on 9 October 2018. The funds raised were to support conservation projects protecting rhino and other endangered African species.

Each rhino was specially designed, decorated and embellished by internationally renowned artists including Glen Baxter, Jake and Dinos Chapman, Eileen Cooper, Adam Dant, Nancy Fouts, Nick Gentry, Zhang Huan, Patrick Hughes, David Mach, Harland Miller, Marc Quinn, Axel Scheffler, Gavin Turk, Dave White, Ronnie Wood, David Yarrow and Jonathan Yeo.

=== Turtle Trail (2025) ===
In summer 2025, Tusk Trust organised the Tusk Turtle Trail in London, a public art trail featuring 16 life-sized turtle sculptures created by internationally recognised artists and public figures. The sculptures were installed across central locations including Covent Garden, Leicester Square, Piccadilly Circus, Carnaby, London Bridge, and Mayfair, from 16 July to 1 September 2025.

The initiative aimed to raise awareness of the threats facing marine turtles and to support Tusk’s marine conservation programmes in Africa. Following the exhibition, the sculptures were auctioned to generate funds for the charity’s projects.

Artists and contributors included musician Ronnie Wood, entrepreneur Deborah Meaden, broadcaster Steven Bartlett, photographer Rankin, artists Jacob Vilató, Philip Colbert and Charlie Mackesy, actress Helen Mirren, and other international creatives and public figures.

== Tusk Trustees ==
The Chairman of the Tusk Board is Alexander Rhodes. He is also Head of Purpose at Mishcon de Reya, providing strategic Environmental, Social, and Governance (ESG) advice. He was the founding CEO of Stop Ivory and head of the Secretariat to the inter-governmental Elephant Protection Initiative. He joined Tusk’s Board in 2014, and was appointed Chairman in 2020.

Other board members are Dr Susan Canney, Patrick Harverson, Beatrice Karanja, Nick Maughan, Jill May, Deborah Meaden, and Mark Tyndall.

== Tusk Conservation Awards ==
The Tusk Conservation Awards, in partnership with Ninety-One (formerly Investec Asset Management), is an annual event to celebrate African-based conservation leaders and wildlife rangers, and their significant impacts in the field. Tusk Trust has presented the annual Tusk Conservation Awards every year in London since 2013. Kate Silverton presented the Tusk Conservation Awards ceremony until 2022.

There are three Tusk Awards presented annually:

- Prince William Award for Conservation in Africa: This lifetime achievement award, sponsored by Ninety One, honors a distinguished individual for their outstanding dedication and exceptional continued contribution to conservation in Africa. Past winners: Hipólito Lima (2020), Dr. Carlos Lopes Pereira (2019), Pete Morkel (2018), Rian Labuschagne (2017), John Kahekwa (2016), Garth Owen-Smith (2015), Richard Bonham (2014), Clive Stockil (2013).
- Tusk Award for Conservation in Africa: Sponsored by Land Rover, this award recognizes an emerging conservation leader, in recognition of their outstanding success shown in their chosen field. Winners: Fanny Minesi (2023), Miguel Gonçalves (2022), Julie Razafimanahaka (2021), John Kamanga (2020), Tomas Diagne (2019), Vincent Opyene (2018), Brighton Kumchedwa (2017), Cathy Dreyer (2016), Dr Emmanuel de Merode (2015), Herizo Andrianandrasana (2014), Tom Lalampaa (2013).
- Tusk Wildlife Ranger Award: Sponsored by The Nick Maughan Foundation, this award gives international recognition to the dedication and commitment of an individual who works in the field to protect Africa’s wildlife. Past winners: Amos Gwema (2020), Benson Kanyembo (2019), Julius Obwona (2018), Lucky Ndlovu & Solomon Chidunuka (2017), Manuel Sacaia (2016), Edward Ndiritu (2015).

On 12 September 2013, Prince William and his wife Catherine, Duchess of Cambridge attended the 1st annual Tusk Conservation Awards.

At the Tusk Conservation Awards 2016 Sir David Attenborough was also honoured for his services to conservation by Prince William.

In 2022, Tusk celebrated the 10th Anniversary of the Tusk Conservation awards, with Prince William in attendance and presenting the awards to the winners. In 2023, during the Tusk Conservation Award, Prince William called for climate action in his speech, urging for 'no let up' in efforts to halt the 'terrifying' loss of wildlife in Africa.
