= John Kay (economist) =

British economist (born 1948)

John Anderson Kay
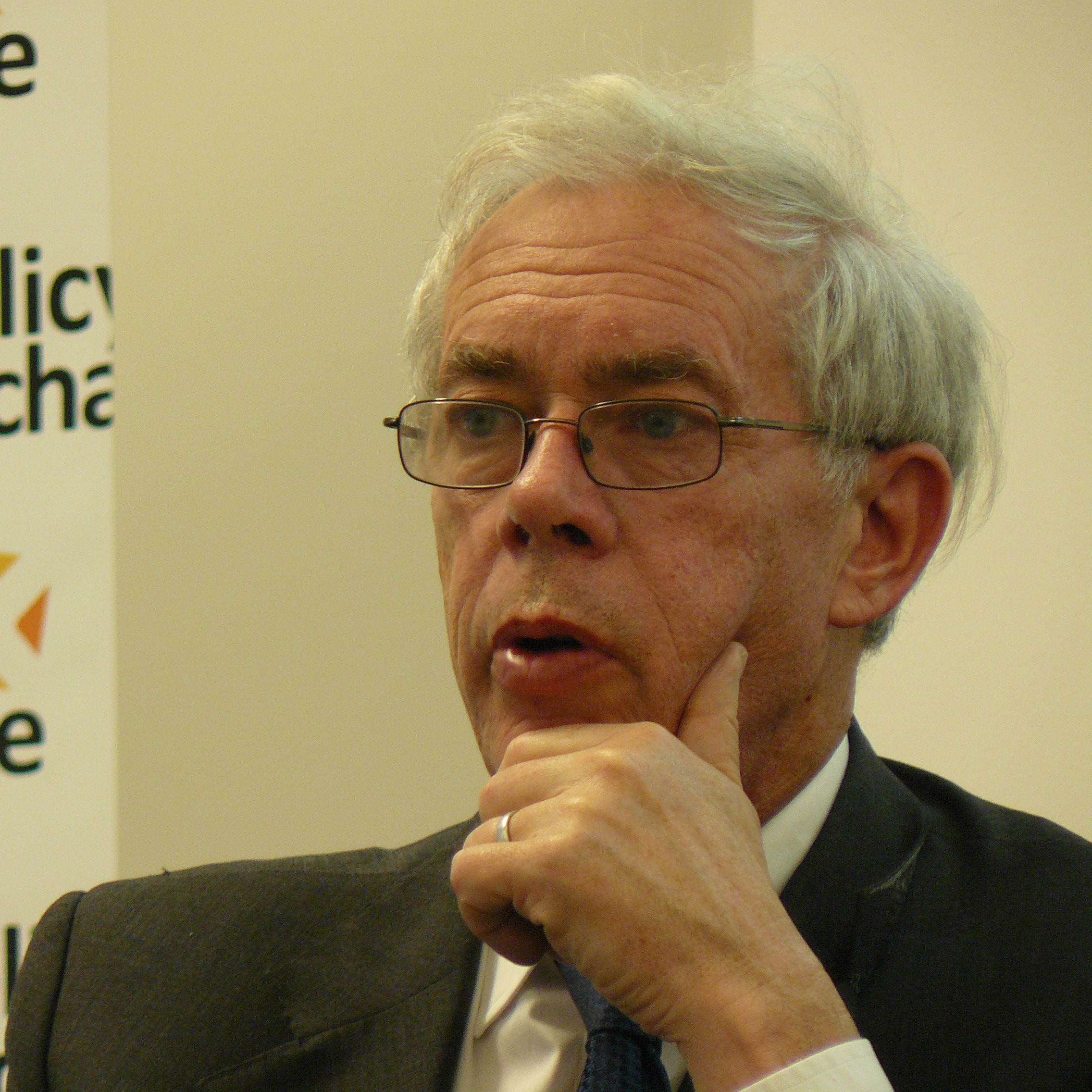
- Kay in 2012
- Born: 1948 (age 77–78); Edinburgh
- Occupation: Economist

Academic background
- Education: Professor
- Alma mater: Royal High School, Edinburgh University, and Nuffield College, Oxford

Academic work
- Discipline: Economics
- Institutions: London School of Economics, University of Oxford and London Business School

Sir John Anderson Kay, CBE, FRSE, FBA, FAcSS (born 1948) is a British economist. He was the first dean of Oxford's Saïd Business School and has held chairs at the London School of Economics, the University of Oxford, and London Business School. He has been a fellow of St John's College, Oxford, since 1970.

== Early life and education ==
Born in Edinburgh, Kay was educated at the Royal High School, Edinburgh University, and Nuffield College, Oxford. He lectured in economics at Oxford from 1971 to 1978.

== Later career ==
In 1979, Kay became Research Director and the Director of the independent think tank, the Institute for Fiscal Studies. In 1986 he became a professor at the London Business School and founded London Economics, a consultancy firm. He was the first director of Oxford's Said Business School from 1997 to 1999, and has written at some length as to why he chose to resign after only two years. He has served as a director of Halifax plc and of several investment companies.

In 2003, Kay addressed non-economists, attempting to answer what Robert Lucas has called the most exciting economic question: across the globe, why are so few rich and so many poor?

He is a regular editorial contributor to the Financial Times, where he has also had a weekly column since 1995. He sits on the European Advisory Board of Princeton University Press.

In 2012 he presented a substantial report to the British government on reform of the equity market, which suggested that "the stockmarket exists to provide companies with equity capital and to give savers a stake in economic growth. Over time that simple truth has been forgotten". Kay suggested a series of reforms which he hoped would correct some problems with stock markets; some critics suggested his analysis of the problem was better than his proposed solution.

Kay has also served as a member of the Council of Economic Advisers to the First Minister of Scotland from 2007 to 2011. Five months before the 2014 Scottish independence referendum, Kay said it was a "mistake" for voters to think claims of an independent Scotland being one of the world's wealthiest nations would mean more cash in their pockets. Kay warned that using GDP as a measure fails to reveal how much money bypasses locals by going straight to foreign companies and drew comparisons with Ireland, which appeared "better off" than it actually was before economic meltdown.

He also spoke as part of Asian Institute of Finance's Distinguished Speaker Series in 2016 entitled "Other People’s Money: Masters of the Universe or Servants of the People?" in Kuala Lumpur, Malaysia.

== Honours ==
In 1997, Kay was elected a Fellow of the British Academy (FBA). In 2008, he was elected a Fellow of the Royal Society of Edinburgh (FRSE). In 2016, he was elected a Fellow of the Academy of Social Sciences (FAcSS).

Kay received an Honorary Doctorate from Heriot-Watt University in 2009

Kay was appointed Commander of the Order of the British Empire (CBE) in the 2014 New Year Honours for services to economics and was knighted in the 2021 Birthday Honours for services to economics, finance and business.

== Books ==
Some of Kay's many columns on economics and business topics, published in the Financial Times, are reprinted in:

- The Hare & the Tortoise (2006)
- Everlasting Light Bulbs (2004)
- The Business of Economics (1996)

Other books include:

- The Corporation in the Twenty-First Century (2025)
- Greed is Dead (2020) with Paul Collier
- Radical Uncertainty (2020) with Mervyn King
- Other People's Money: The Real Business of Finance (2015)
- Obliquity: Why Our Goals Are Best Pursued Indirectly (2010)
- The Long and the Short of It: Finance and Investment for Normally Intelligent People Who Are Not in the Industry (2009, 2nd edition 2016)
- The Truth About Markets (2003). Published in the USA in 2004 as Culture and Prosperity: Why Some Nations Are Rich But Most Remain Poor. HarperCollins.
- Why Firms Succeed (1995), a slightly revised, shortened version of Foundations of Corporate Success, written for the American market.
- Foundations of Corporate Success (1993)
- The British Tax System, (1979, and four subsequent editions), with Mervyn King. ISBN 978-0198283133.
