= George Brooksbank =

British business executive and former cricketer (born 1981)

- Born: George Stamp Brooksbank; 4 July 1981 (age 45); London, United Kingdom
- Education: Cass Business School
- Occupations: Business executive Cricketer
- Organization(s): Leconfield Property Group; Fairway Capital

George Stamp Brooksbank (born 4 July 1981) is a British business executive and former cricketer who played for Hertfordshire County Cricket Club. He is the founder and chief executive officer (CEO) of Fairway Capital and Leconfield Property Group.

== Early life and education ==
Born in 1981 in London, United Kingdom, Brookbank was educated at Cheltenham College. He graduated from Cass Business School with a master's degree in property valuation and law.

== Career ==
=== Cricket ===
Brooksbank played two matches for Hertfordshire in 2004. He was part of the Marylebone Cricket Club team that toured Argentina in 2008.

In February 2024, Brooksbank played for England in the IMC Over-40 World Cup, where the team reached the semi-finals.

=== Business ===
In 2010, Brooksbank founded Leconfield Property Group, a residential development and construction company specializing in property acquisitions. In 2013, Leconfield Property Group purchased Margaret Thatcher's house in Belgravia. The company later refurbished the property and resold it for US$43.5 million in 2016.

In 2016, Brooksbank founded Fairway Capital, an investment management firm. In March 2020, the firm launched a value-add residential fund. In July 2020, it raised £80 million from investors. In October 2020, the fund received £34.5 million from Investec for property acquisitions. It raised additional funds from Catalyst Capital and Coutts & Co. in February 2021. The fund has acquired ten properties in Belgravia and Knightsbridge for £70 million. In 2023, the Fairway Capital Fund purchased the Belgravia Garage on Eaton Mews West from the Grosvenor Estate. In 2024, it obtained planning consent to convert the site into six houses and office space.
