= Mervyn King, Baron King of Lothbury =

British economist (born 1948)

The Right Honourable The Lord King of Lothbury KG GBE DL FBA
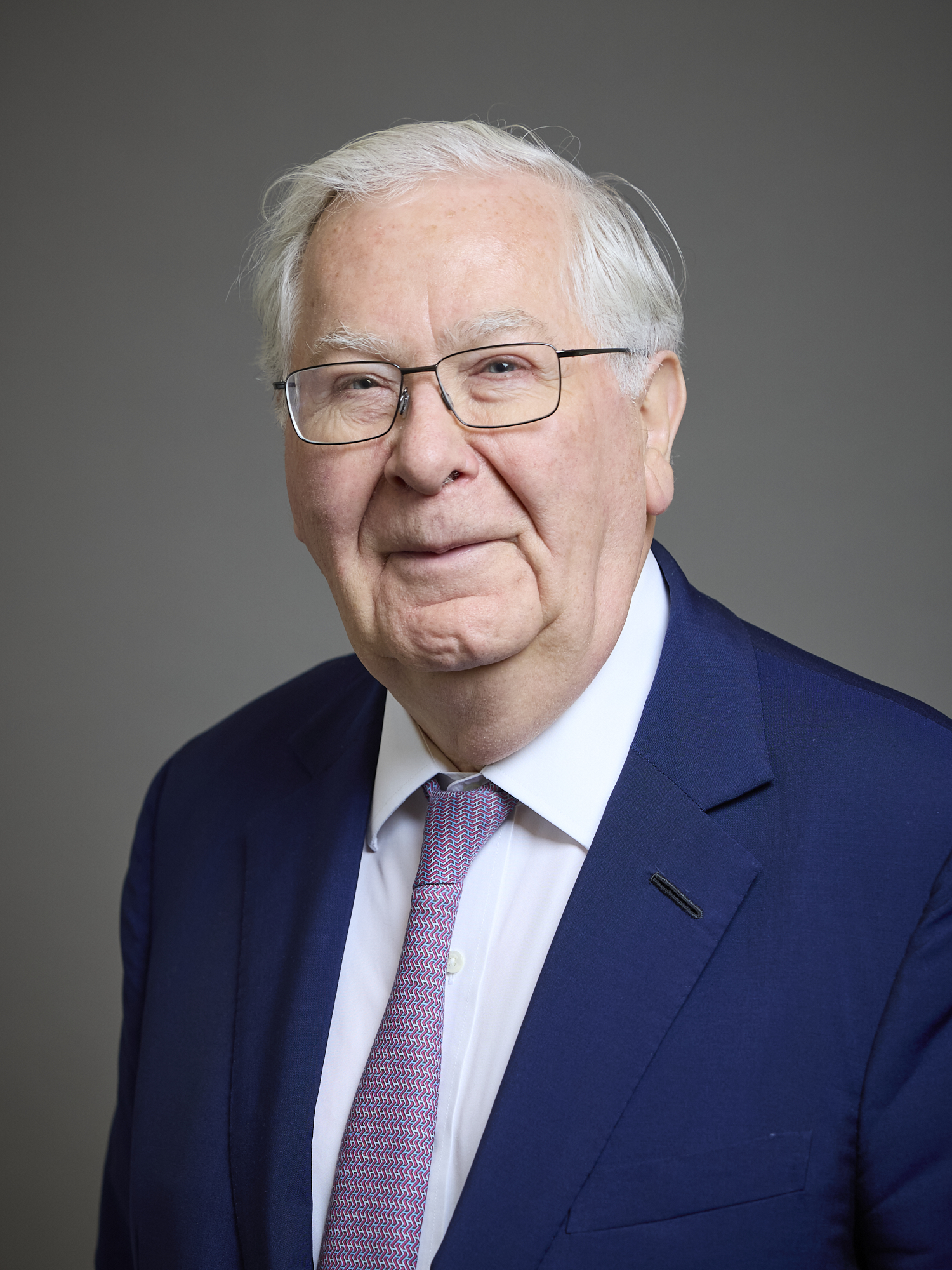
- Official portrait, 2024

Governor of the Bank of England
- In office 1 July 2003 – 1 July 2013
- Appointed by: Gordon Brown
- Preceded by: Edward George
- Succeeded by: Mark Carney

Member of the House of Lords
- Lord Temporal
- Life peerage 19 July 2013

Personal details
- Born: Mervyn Allister King; 30 March 1948 (age 78) Chesham Bois, Buckinghamshire, England
- Spouse: Barbara Melander (m. 2007)
- Education: King's College, Cambridge (MA); Harvard University (Scholar); St John's College, Cambridge (Fellow)
- Mervyn King on the Today programme from the BBC programme Today, 2 May 2012

Mervyn Allister King, Baron King of Lothbury, (born 30 March 1948) is a British economist and public servant who was governor of the Bank of England from 2003 to 2013. Emeritus Professor of the London School of Economics and chairman of the Philharmonia since 2020, Lord King served as president of Marylebone Cricket Club for 2024/25.

Born in Buckinghamshire, King was educated at Wolverhampton Grammar School, Staffordshire, before going up to read economics at King's College, Cambridge, and Harvard University. Elected a Fellow of St John's College, Cambridge, working as a researcher on the Cambridge Growth Project he then taught at the University of Birmingham, Harvard and MIT, before becoming a professor of economics at the London School of Economics. He joined the Bank of England in 1990 as a non-executive director, and became the chief economist in 1991. In 1998, he was promoted deputy governor of the Bank and a member of the Group of Thirty.

King was appointed as Governor of the Bank of England in 2003, succeeding Sir Eddie George. Most notably, he oversaw the Bank during the 2008 financial crisis and ensuing Great Recession. King retired from office as Governor in June 2013, being succeeded by Mark Carney. Created a life peer in July 2013, Lord King entered the House of Lords as a crossbencher. From 2014 until 2022 he was professor of economics and law, a joint chair at New York University's Stern School of Business and School of Law.

== Early life and career ==
Mervyn King is a son of Eric King, a railway porter who retrained as a geography teacher after the War, and Kathleen (née Passingham). Born at Chesham Bois in Buckinghamshire, he was educated at Warstones Junior School and Wolverhampton Grammar School in Staffordshire, before going up to read economics at King's College (graduating in 1969 with a first-class BA degree, proceeding MA in 1973) and St John's College, Cambridge, then (as Kennedy Scholar) at Harvard University. Whilst at Cambridge, King was Treasurer of the Cambridge University Liberal Club in 1968.

Elected a Fellow of St John's College in 1972, he worked as a researcher on the Cambridge Growth Project with future Nobel Laureate Sir Richard Stone and Terry Barker at the University of Cambridge. From 1977 until 1984, he taught at the University of Birmingham and was a Visiting Professor at Harvard then Massachusetts Institute of Technology (MIT) where he shared an office with then-Assistant Professor Ben Bernanke. In October 1984 he was appointed Professor of Economics at the London School of Economics where he founded the Financial Markets Group. In 1981, he was one of the 364 university economists who signed a letter to The Times condemning Chancellor Geoffrey Howe's 1981 Budget.

== Bank of England ==
King joined the Bank in March 1991 as chief economist and executive director, after being a non-executive director from 1990 to 1991. He was appointed Deputy Governor in 1997, taking post on 1 June 1998. In the same year, King became a member of the Group of Thirty. An ex-officio member of the Bank's interest-rate setting Monetary Policy Committee since its inception in 1997, King took part in its monthly meetings. Succeeding Sir Eddie George as Governor on 1 July 2003, he became the first incumbent Governor of the Bank of England to receive an audience with Queen Elizabeth II.

While Governor, King was responsible for putting Matthew Boulton and James Watt on the £50 note.

=== 2008 financial crisis ===
After becoming governor, King explained that Bank of England policy was "similar to that of the Federal Reserve" under Alan Greenspan. Greenspan described his approach as "mitigat[ing] the fallout [from the bursting of a bubble] when it occurs". King agreed with Alan Greenspan that, "It is hard to identify asset price 'bubbles'."

Other warnings about the UK housing market followed, including from the National Institute of Economic and Social Research in 2004 and the OECD in 2005. King noted the "unusually large" difference between the RPIX and CPI at the beginning of 2004 (the latter does not include house prices as part of its inflation measure, whilst the former does), and, six months later, that UK house prices had risen "to levels which are well above what most people would regard as sustainable in the longer term", having increased by more than 20% over the preceding year and more than 100% over the preceding five.

In 2005, The Economist described the run-up in UK house prices as forming part of "the biggest bubble in history", and, by October 2007—when the UK housing bubble was at its peak — the IMF was reporting that the UK housing market was "overpriced by up to 40 per cent". As noted by the OECD, house-price volatility "can raise systemic risks as the banking and mortgage sectors are vulnerable to fluctuations in house prices due to their exposure to the housing market."

Dean Baker in The American Prospect said the failure by Greenspan and King to tackle their respective countries' housing market bubbles resulted in catastrophic "fallout" when the bubbles burst, resulting in both countries' worst recessions since the Great Depression. UK–US inaction may be compared to action taken by China and Australia.

Another result of the financial crisis was King's rejection of the Bank's devout focus on price stability, or inflation targeting, a policy that was instituted after Black Wednesday in 1992 and continued by King after becoming Governor in 2003. One of the two early lessons King drew from crisis were that "price stability does not guarantee stability of the economy as a whole" and that "the instruments used to pursue financial stability are in need of sharpening and refining."

The 2012 Financial Services Bill, in transferring the majority of macroprudential regulatory powers from the FSA to the Bank, granted the Financial Policy Committee (chaired by the Governor) the power to curb lending in booms, including placing limits on the public's access to mortgages. A former senior BoE official summed up the Bank's pre-crisis performance: "How can you look back with the benefit of hindsight and see it as a success? We were responsible for financial stability and we utterly failed to take any avoiding action against the greatest financial crisis in our lifetimes". David Blanchflower said that, even as late as the summer of 2008, King did not even see the financial crisis coming.

In its review of Bank of England accountability, one of the major complaints of the Treasury Select Committee was the Bank's refusal to undertake an internal review of its performance during the financial crisis. Such a review would pose difficulties since evidence on how its most senior policymakers arrived at their decisions was destroyed as a matter of course. By contrast, the United States publishes the Federal Reserve's deliberations with a five-year lag, which have provided "the most detailed picture yet of how top officials at the central bank didn't anticipate the storm about to hit the U.S. economy and the global financial system." As in the UK, the US central bank's failure led to a new regulatory framework, the 2010 Dodd–Frank Wall Street Reform and Consumer Protection Act.

==== Response to crisis ====
King argued that when the financial crisis and bank meltdown hit in autumn 2008, he and other Western central bankers "prevented a Great Depression", in part by cutting interest rates to virtually zero. The Economist agreed, saying that he "has a point". A 2012 review of actions taken by Western central banks in the face of the crisis also supported King's claim. The bank has faced criticism, however, for the pace of the rate cuts, which took five months from the beginning of October 2008 to get down from 5.0% to 0.5%, where they remained for several years.

After becoming only the second Bank of England Governor to speak to the TUC in its 142-year history, King conceded that people were "entitled to be angry" about unemployment and the bank bailout.

King has been scathing about the banking sector since it crashed, especially its "breathtaking" £1 trillion bailout and its continuation of bonus awards in 2009, calling for a serious review of banking's structure and regulation.

In a Daily Telegraph interview in March 2011, King said banks had "put profits before people", that failure to reform the sector could result in another financial crisis, and that traditional manufacturing industries have a more "moral" way of operating. In an interview with The Times in March 2012, he said that the banks are still in denial about the "very real and wholly understandable" anger that is felt at their behaviour, Bankers have not been happy with his excoriating views and insistence on avoiding moral hazard, but King insists that "[m]arket discipline can't apply to everyone except banks", pinpointing the banks' sense of grievance on their finding it "very, very difficult to face up to the failure of their banking model".

Before the end of King's governorship in 2013, some top UK banks warned that unless a less "hostile" figure were found as a successor, they could move abroad. On 26 November 2012, Mark Carney was named as King's successor.

==== Banks bailout ====
King was accused of refusing funding to the Northern Rock Bank, precipitating a run on that bank, a situation not seen in the UK since 1914. King later said that it had been the Chancellor Alistair Darling, not he, who had the final word on refusing the necessary help to Northern Rock. In his review of King's tenure as Governor, Times journalist David Wighton wrote:

Sir John Gieve, the Deputy Governor for financial stability, . . . was widely seen as the fall guy for the Bank's dithering over Northern Rock a few months earlier. In fact, he had been urging King to act, and his allies accused King of failing to defend him when the chairman of the Commons Treasury Committee accused Gieve of being "asleep in the back shop while there was a mugging out front". Gieve's mother had died at the height of the Northern Rock crisis and he had taken a few days off. King failed to make clear to the committee that this was why his deputy had been away. King's behaviour had been "very bad form", according to one former Bank director.

In his memoirs, Alistair Darling was critical of King for emphasising moral hazard—the doctrine of not saving the banks from the consequences of their own mistakes—instead of rescuing the banks by pumping money into them as the banking-system meltdown occurred in autumn 2008. Despite his refusal to give funding to the retail banks, he retained his job, and submitted in defence to a Treasury Select Committee (New York Times/Financial Times, 20 September 2007) that his actions were on the basis that the Bank of England was the "lender of last resort" but subsequently supported moves to provide funding to those banks which had been nationalised or partly nationalised.

=== Political interventions ===
King's highly-critical Mansion House Speech in 2009 allegedly helped to bolster the Conservatives in the run-up to the general election. King called for the break-up of the country's biggest banks, as well as arguing that, unless the Bank were given more active, interventionist powers to ensure financial stability, it would be like a church: able to "do no more than issue sermons or organise burials." King later advised a rebalancing of the economy, increased saving, and an "elimination of the structural deficit". In November 2009, he told MPs that the then Labour government's intention of halving the deficit over the next five years was insufficient. In May 2010, just days after the Coalition government was formed, King said he had spoken to Chancellor George Osborne and supported his plans to cut spending by a further £6 billion within the 2010–11 fiscal year. The Liberal Democrats did not need to be talked around to agreeing to the severity of the cuts.

In November 2010, it was revealed that some senior staff at the Bank of England (one of them was David Blanchflower) were uncomfortable with King's endorsement of the government's public spending cuts, accusing him of overstepping the boundary between monetary and fiscal policy. King's support for the government's cuts was in spite of concerns within the bank that cutting spending so rapidly could derail the UK's nascent economic-recovery. These revelations led to accusations of King being a "coalition courtier" and of making "excessively political" interventions with regard to UK economic policy.

The accusations were given greater weight after the December 2010 WikiLeaks Cablegate. As a result of the WikiLeaks disclosures and David Laws' account of the Tory-Lib-Dem coalition-talks, King was asked by the Political and Constitutional Reform Select Committee to explain why he was seemingly cited in the talks as backing Tory plans to introduce spending cuts this year. King insisted to the committee that "at no stage did I offer any advice on the composition of any measures designed to reduce the government deficit"; the committee implicitly accepted King's explanation of events as he is not even mentioned, let alone criticised, in their final report.

According to George Osborne, Gus O'Donnell made an offer to have King brief the Tories and Lib Dems during the Coalition's formative talks; however, the parties suspected they "knew what he was going to say and . . . also thought it was more appropriate for our Treasury spokesmen to talk to him".

King was criticised again in May 2012 on BBC Radio 4's Today programme, on the day before an election, after he expressed approval of Coalition austerity measures.

In a speech to the European Parliament in Brussels in May 2011, King commented that the Bank of England was more concerned with the broader stability of the economy and banking sector than with inflation figures: "The economic consequences of high-level indebtedness now would become more severe if rates were to rise. It is the main reason why interest rates are so low." With regard to Project Merlin, King was critical of Chancellor Osborne's misleading figures, and correctly predicted in a "light plausibility check" that Merlin would be a failure. In March 2009, King said any plan for a second fiscal stimulus by the UK Government had to be done with caution.

His Mansion House Speech in June 2009 criticised Chancellor Alistair Darling for resisting significant changes to the allocation of regulatory responsibilities between the FSA, the Treasury and the Bank, which would have given the BoE greater power to fulfil its role of ensuring economic stability.

In January 2012, King received a letter from the Government's former chief scientific adviser Sir David King, Zac Goldsmith, former environment minister John Gummer (and 17 others) warning of the possibility of a carbon bubble. King agreed to an evaluation of the matter.

The BoE's Financial Policy Committee, established to identify emerging bubbles in the financial system, agreed in March 2012 to ask Parliament for new policy tools to be used to prevent another financial crisis. King said that the FPC narrowed its choice of instruments to three—the power to ensure banks have countercyclical capital buffers, the ability to force banks to hold more capital against exposure to specific sectors judged risky, and the power to set leverage ratios—because it will be important to explain to parliament and the wider public why it is or is not using them.

Late March 2019, he argued that the UK should leave without a deal in the wake of the UK's decision to leave the European Union, arguing that the economic consequences would be limited, and that the UK was well-prepared after six months of preparations.

In July 2026, King was nominated to a high-level task force reviewing the Fed's monetary policy by Kevin Warsh. The committee also include Raghuram Rajan, the former governor of the Reserve Bank of India, and Nobel laureate Thomas Sargent.

== Personal life ==
King's wife, Barbara Melander, is a Finnish interior designer and comes from the Swedish-speaking minority in Finland. They married in a private ceremony at a church in Helsinki in 2007.

A fan of Aston Villa F.C., King once arranged a game between Bank of England employees and ex-Villa players. He served on Villa's board of directors from February until April 2016, and then he, along with fellow board member former Football Association chairman David Bernstein, resigned in protest against owner Randy Lerner's stewardship of the club. In January 2024, King was named by Aston Villa as a member of the Honorary Anniversary Board ahead of the AVFC's 150th anniversary season.

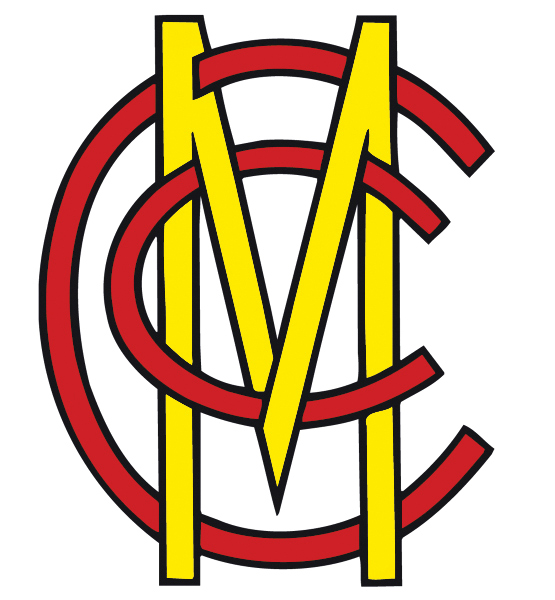

King briefly found himself commentating on an Ashes Test Match for BBC Radio's Test Match Special in 2005, while being interviewed by Simon Mayo. President of the cricket foundation Chance to Shine programme, which fosters competitive cricket in state schools, Lord King is a member of the AELTC and MCC. In 2015, he became President of Worcestershire County Cricket Club and in May 2024, it was announced he would serve as President of the MCC from 1 October 2024 for a 12-month term.

Awarded an Honorary Doctorate of Laws (Hon LLD) by Cambridge University in 2006, King also received an Honorary Doctorate of Literature (Hon DLitt) from Abertay University in July 2013. King has also been elected a Visiting Fellow of Nuffield College, Oxford.

In 2015, King was listed as the 11th most influential person in the Financial Centres International top 500.

== Honours and arms ==
=== Honours ===
Appointed a Knight Grand Cross of the Order of the British Empire (GBE) in the 2011 Birthday Honours, Lord King was advanced as a Knight of the Garter on 23 April 2014.

On 19 July 2013, King was created a Life Peer by Queen Elizabeth II for 'contributions to public service'. Lord King entered the House of Lords on 22 July 2013 as a crossbencher, taking the title Baron King of Lothbury, of Lothbury in the City of London.

On 6 January 2016, King was commissioned a deputy lieutenant for Kent by the Lord Lieutenant, Viscount de L'Isle.

=== Coat of arms ===
Coat of arms of Mervyn King, Baron King of Lothbury
| Coronet That of a Baron Crest Within a Circlet of five Pears Sable three manifest an Oast House Or the roof Argent. Escutcheon Azure a representation of the central façade of the Bank of England Argent between two Flaunches Or each charged with a Book Argent bound Murrey clasped Or. Supporters Dexter: A Lion Or holding in the sinister forepaw a Caduceus Bleu-Celeste the rod Murrey; Sinister: A Lion crowned with an Ancient Crown Or the dexter foreleg in Armour Argent holding in the Gauntlet a Sword fesswise Bleu-Celeste hilt and pommel Murrey. Orders Garter circlet (as KG) Banner Lord King's banner hangs in the Garter Chapel (as KG) and at St Paul's British Empire Chapel (as GBE). |

== Books ==
King's books include:

- The British Tax System, (1979, and four subsequent editions), with John Kay.
- The End of Alchemy: Money, Banking and the Future of the Global Economy, (2016).
- Radical Uncertainty: Decision-making for an unknowable future, (2020), with John Kay.

Government offices
| Preceded by Edward George | Governor of the Bank of England; 2003–2013 | Succeeded by Mark Carney |
Orders of precedence in the United Kingdom
| Preceded by The Lord Livingston of Parkhead | Gentlemen; Baron King of Lothbury | Followed by The Lord Mendelsohn |
