= Edward George, Baron George =

Governor of the Bank of England (1938–2009)

The Right Honourable The Lord George GBE PC DL
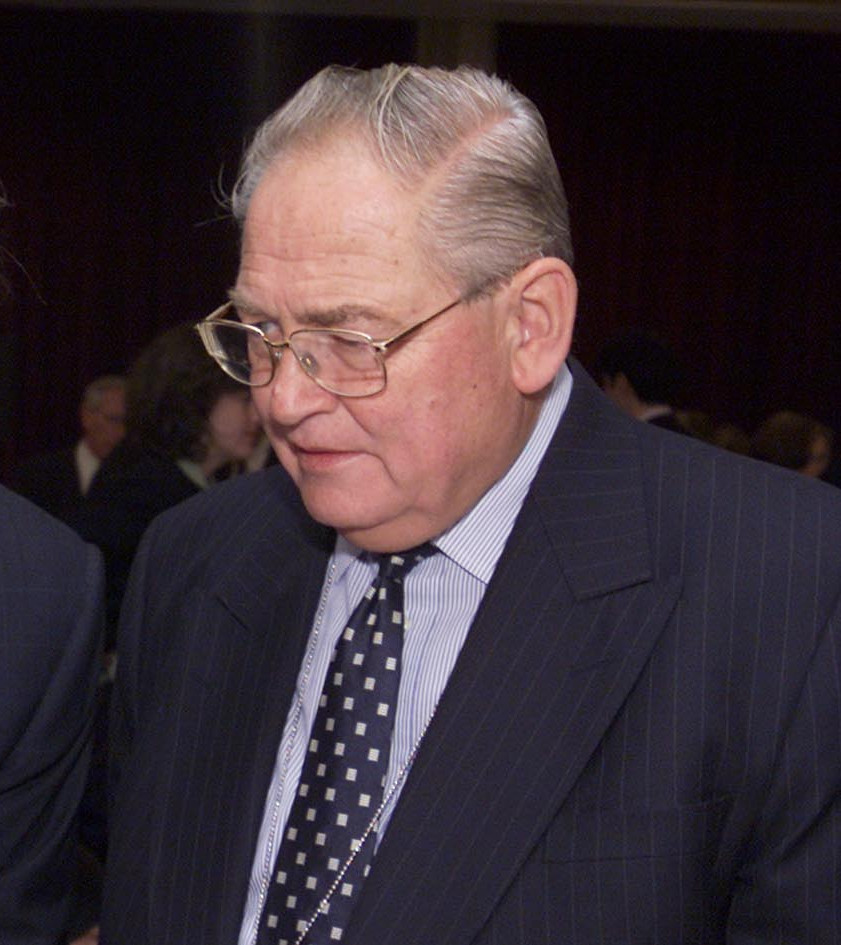
- Edward George in 2000

Governor of the Bank of England
- In office 1 July 1993 – 30 June 2003
- Appointed by: Kenneth Clarke
- Preceded by: Robin Leigh-Pemberton
- Succeeded by: Mervyn King

Member of the House of Lords
- Lord Temporal
- Life peerage 29 June 2004 – 18 April 2009

Personal details
- Born: 16 September 1938 Carshalton, England
- Died: 18 April 2009 (aged 70) St Tudy, Cornwall, England
- Spouse: Vanessa Williams (m. 1962)
- Children: 3
- Education: Dulwich College
- Alma mater: Emmanuel College, Cambridge
- Profession: Economist

Edward Alan John George, Baron George (16 September 1938 – 18 April 2009), known as Eddie George, or sometimes as "Steady Eddie", was Governor of the Bank of England from 1993 to 2003 and, after his retirement, sat on the board of NM Rothschild and Sons.

== Early life ==
George was born and grew up in Carshalton, the son of Alan, a Post Office clerk, and his wife Olive. He attended the independent Dulwich College on a scholarship. Having learned to speak Russian at Dulwich, he carried out his National Service at the Joint Services School for Linguists. He attended and graduated from Emmanuel College, Cambridge.

== Financial career ==
George joined the Bank of England in 1962. Apart from secondments to Moscow State University, the Bank for International Settlements, and the International Monetary Fund, he remained there throughout his career.

After three years as Deputy Governor, he was appointed Governor of the Bank of England to succeed Robin Leigh-Pemberton, who retired on the completion of his second five-year term of office on 30 June 1993. During the early part of George's governance, his successful relationship with then-Chancellor of the Exchequer Kenneth Clarke earned them the nickname 'the Ken and Eddie Show'. Upon the Labour Party coming to power at the 1997 general election, the Bank was given independence in setting UK interest rates by Gordon Brown, the incoming Chancellor of the Exchequer. George was succeeded as Governor of the Bank of England in July 2003 by Mervyn King.

George attracted controversy in 1998 when he was widely reported to have made a statement to London newspaper executives implying that unemployment in the north of England was a price worth paying to preserve affluence in the south of the country. He later claimed that his remarks had been misconstrued.

== Later life ==
George served as a Governor of his former school, Dulwich College, between 1998 and 2008 and as the Chairman of the Governors between 2003 and 2008.

On 18 April 2009, George, a heavy smoker, died of lung cancer.

== Personal life ==
George married Vanessa George, Lady George (née Williams) in Surrey in 1962. They had three children. Lady George died in March 2017.

== Honours ==
George was appointed Knight Grand Cross of the Order of the British Empire in the 2000 Birthday Honours. He was made a life peer in June 2004 as Baron George, of St Tudy in the County of Cornwall. He was awarded an honorary D.Sc. by the University of Buckingham on 4 March 2000, and appointed a deputy lieutenant of Cornwall in March 2006.

== Arms ==
Coat of arms of Edward George, Baron George
Adopted 2006 Coronet Coronet of a Baron Crest A Dragon sejant erect Gules holding between the forefeet a Bezant Escutcheon Paly of four Or and Argent a Barrulet dancetty of two points upwards and one point downwards each point terminating in a Cinquefoil pierced Sable interlaced with a Barrulet dancetty of two points downwards and one point upwards each point terminating in a Cinquefoil pierced Gules Supporters On either side a Vanessid Butterfly Or the wings Argent the outer margins Or Motto STABILITY Badge A Sword point downwards Gules the blade surmounted by a Vanessid Butterfly Or the wings displayed Argent the outer margins Or Symbolism The barrulets in the Arms suggest graphs of credit and debit, appropriate for the Governor of the Bank of England and set on the metallic tinctures of Gold and Argent for coinage. The dragon is not only appropriate for the guardianship of treasure but is also associated with the name George. The Vanessid butterflies are a punning allusion on Vanessa, the name of Lord George's wife. In the Badge the butterfly surmounts a red sword for the City of London.

Government offices
Preceded by Robin Leigh-Pemberton	Governor of the Bank of England; 1993–2003	Succeeded by Mervyn King
