= Gordon Richardson, Baron Richardson of Duntisbourne =

British banker, lawyer and Governor of the Bank of England

The Right Honourable The Lord Richardson of Duntisbourne KG MBE TD PC DL
- Official portrait, 1977

Governor of the Bank of England
- In office 1 July 1973 – 30 June 1983
- Preceded by: Sir Leslie O'Brien
- Succeeded by: Robin Leigh-Pemberton

Member of the House of Lords
- Lord Temporal
- Life peerage 11 February 1983 – 22 January 2010

Personal details
- Born: Gordon William Humphreys Richardson; 25 November 1915
- Died: 22 January 2010 (aged 94)
- Education: Gonville and Caius College, Cambridge
- Occupation: Lawyer, banker

Gordon William Humphreys Richardson, Baron Richardson of Duntisbourne (25 November 1915 – 22 January 2010) was a British banker, former lawyer, and former Governor of the Bank of England.

== Biography ==
Richardson was born to John Robert and Nellie Richardson, and was educated at Nottingham High School and Gonville and Caius College, Cambridge.

He served during the Second World War and became a Member of the Order of the British Empire, Military Division, in 1944. He was called to the bar at Gray's Inn in 1946, becoming a member of the Bar Council between 1951 and 1955, but abandoned law for a career in the City of London. He became a director of J. Henry Schroder & Co in 1957, and was later chairman between 1962 and 1973.

He was appointed Governor of the Bank of England in 1973, and remained in that position until 1983. November 1973 saw a run on London and County Securities, marking the start of the secondary banking crisis.

While serving as governor, Richardson joined the Privy Council (1976) and was awarded the Territorial Decoration (1979). He was created a life peer as Baron Richardson of Duntisbourne, of Duntisbourne in the County of Gloucestershire, and a Knight Companion of the Order of the Garter, both in 1983.

In February 1978, Richardson delivered the inaugural Mais Lecture, entitled "Reflections on the Conduct of Monetary Policy". Since then, the annual lecture has come to be regarded as a leading event in the banking and financial community of the City of London, hosting each of the subsequent Bank of England Governors, as well as Prime Ministers, Chancellors of the Exchequer, and European Central Bankers.

Richardson was a member of the Morgan Stanley advisory board from 1984. Between 1985 and 1991, he was a member of the Group of Thirty, and thereafter remained as their Honorary Chair. He was chairman of the Pilgrim Trust from 1984 to 1989.

On the evening of 22 January 2010, the Bank of England released a statement announcing Richardson's death.

== Coat of arms ==
Coat of arms of Gordon Richardson, Baron Richardson of Duntisbourne, KG, MBE, TD, PC, DL
Coronet Coronet of a Baron Escutcheon Argent a fess wavy Bleu Celeste between in chief three swords in fess points upwards Gules and in base a pair of scales on a bordure also Gules eight bezants. Orders Order of the Garter; Order of the British Empire Symbolism The pale blue fess wavy represents the River Cam, and hence the University of Cambridge, Richardson's alma mater. The bezants represent gold coins for banking. The swords refer to the City of London, a city to which he had many links. The scales are a symbol of law and refer to his law career. His crest (not depicted here) is a seated female figure which represents the Bank of England, and is identifiable with the female figure of Britannia which appears on coinage.

== Footnotes ==
Government offices
Preceded by Sir Leslie O'Brien	Governor of the Bank of England; 1973–1983	Succeeded by Robin Leigh-Pemberton
