= Jihan Abass =

Kenyan entrepreneur and businesswoman

- Born: 1993 or 1994 (age 32–33); Kenya
- Education: University of Oxford (MBA); Bayes Business School (undergraduate degree)
- Known for: Founder and CEO of Lami Insurance Technology and Lami Direct Insurance

Jihan Abass (born 1993/1994) is a Kenyan entrepreneur and businesswoman who is the founder and CEO of Lami Insurance Technology, an insurance technology company based in Nairobi, Kenya, and Lami Direct Insurance, a digital vehicle insurance company. Abass founded Lami to increase Africa's low insurance coverage.

Abass was formerly a commodity futures trader and sugar trader at a trading house in London, England, where she traded on the New York City and London sugar markets.

Abass has an MBA from the University of Oxford and an undergraduate degree in finance from Bayes Business School.

== Honors and awards ==
In 2020, Abass was picked to represent Africa at InsureTech Connect 2020.

In 2021, Quartz named her an Africa Innovator.

In 2022, Aljazeera Africa Direct covered a documentary about Jihan's Business. In 2022, featured as cover story in Lioness of Africa 2022.
