= BoxWise =

British non-profit

- BoxWise Foundation
- Founded: 2020
- Founder: Nick Maughan and Rick Ogden
- Type: Charitable organization
- Purpose: Youth development through amateur boxing

BoxWise (BoxWise Foundation) is a British youth charity that runs non-contact boxing programmes for young people facing disadvantage. Its courses are delivered with local amateur boxing clubs and combine boxing training with life-skills work and help with education, training or employment. BoxWise was founded by Nick Maughan and Rick Ogden and was initially funded through the Nick Maughan Foundation. BoxWise Foundation was incorporated as a company limited by guarantee in August 2023 and registered as a charity in England and Wales in March 2024.

== History ==
BoxWise began in London. In 2021, Miguel's Boxing Gym in Brixton partnered with BoxWise on a 13-week programme, one of five London sites then operating under the BoxWise name. The same year, the programme expanded to Birmingham, Manchester, Glasgow, Pembrokeshire and Sheffield. By December 2021, more than 250 young people had gone through BoxWise programmes and it was operating in 11 locations.

By 2023, the Nick Maughan Foundation had helped expand BoxWise to 42 venues across the United Kingdom, including work with the youth homelessness charity Centrepoint. The Centre for Social Justice also covered BoxWise programmes in Manchester and Glasgow, including a course at Fox ABC in Manchester for young people not in education, employment or training.

In July 2024, Queensberry Promotions pledged £1 million to BoxWise. Frank Warren became the first chairman of the BoxWise Foundation Development Board, and the pledge was to be matched by Nick Maughan and Chris Kilvington.

In 2025, BoxWise's founders launched the Bahamas Boxing Academy in Nassau, The Bahamas. BoxWise co-founder Rick Ogden presented the project as an adaptation of the BoxWise model for The Bahamas, and Minister of Youth, Sports and Culture Mario Bowleg thanked Maughan, the BoxWise team for their support.

== Programme ==
BoxWise's core programme is a ten-week non-contact boxing course aimed at building confidence and discipline. In 2021, some BoxWise courses ran for 13 weeks and included boxing sessions, equipment, transport support in some cases, and hot meals for participants.

BoxWise works with local boxing clubs throughout the U.K. Participant clubs receive help with coaching qualifications, personal training qualifications and work opportunities in addition to fully funded equipment, food and the core curriculum delivery.

By 2023, BoxWise was running more than 45 ten-week programmes through England Boxing-affiliated gyms. The course syllabus used six values: purpose, adaptability, imagination, discipline, emotional control and teamwork. Coaches also helped participants with CVs, interview skills and qualification fees.

BoxWise lists several versions of its programme, including BoxWise Lite, a one-week holiday version of the under-18 course; five-week school courses in London and Scotland; adapted disability boxing sessions at the Pembroke and Pembroke Dock Amateur Boxing Club, Billy's Gym in Maesteg, Star College and Mary Hare School; courses for young people supported by Centrepoint in London, Manchester and Bradford; a programme for young Ukrainians in the United Kingdom following the Russian invasion of Ukraine; a veterans' programme; and women-only sessions for women who have survived domestic violence or abuse. Its materials also state that programmes are delivered by accredited England Boxing coaches, may include a free hot meal, and receive referrals from social workers, police youth offending teams, local authorities, mental health support workers, teachers and parents.

BoxWise also lists overseas programmes, including women's programmes in South Africa and Egypt, adaptive disability sessions in Brazil, and under-18 programmes in Ireland, Uganda and Tanzania.

== Partnerships and public-sector programmes ==
BoxWise works with organisations and public-sector programmes focused on youth homelessness, serious violence and community sport. Youth homeless charity Centrepoint works with BoxWise as part of its support for young people experiencing homelessness.

Youth emergency first aid charity StreetDoctors delivers training sessions for all BoxWise participants. Its BoxWise-linked and grassroots community work has covered thousands of young people.

BoxWise describes England Boxing as a partner in coaching quality, safeguarding and programme delivery, and states that it has invested several million pounds in England Boxing clubs.

In Wales, BoxWise was used by the INTACT programme in the Dyfed-Powys Police area, which worked on serious violence and organised crime. A pilot in Pembrokeshire was followed by BoxWise-funded ten-week intervention sessions in Llanelli, Brecon, Letterston and Llandysul; the report also listed Pembroke Dock, Ammanford, Aberystwyth and Newtown as planned locations.
