= Dallaglio RugbyWorks =

Dallaglio RugbyWorks is a UK-based charity organization assisting young people aged between 12 and 18 who are experiencing school exclusion. The charity engages young people using the values of rugby and sport in general, alongside learning sessions and individualised mentoring to move them towards sustained education, employment and training (EET).

== Overview ==
RugbyWorks was founded by professional rugby player Lawrence Dallaglio in 2009 with the mission to ensure that those young people failed by mainstream education, have an equal chance to be in Education, Employment or Training (EET) post 18.

RugbyWorks operates in challenging environments delivering interventions during the school timetables day with Pupil Referral Units (PRU), Alternative Provisions (AP), Youth Offenders Units (YOI) and mainstream exclusion units.

The charity aims to be working with 7,000+ young people in and outside of school time as well as digitally by 2027.

=== Activities and initiatives ===
Dallaglio RugbyWorks delivers a range of interventions designed to complement the education environments they work in.

The framework of their curriculum is based around their four cornerstones of delivery and underpinned by player profiles – the charity's official commitment to assist young people manage their progress, access employment options and remain associated to their RugbyWorks coaches. It additionally focuses on developing life skills, improving physical health, raising aspirations, and mental well-being.

=== Funders ===
Dallaglio RugbyWorks has the support of a number of funders including Sport England, the Garfield Weston Foundation, the Masonic Charitable Foundation, The Mercers’ Company and East Head Impact. In addition, the Nick Maughan Foundation sponsored the RugbyWorks awards, an event to celebrate the charity's supporters and young people. The charity also has the support of Lawrence Dallaglio, founder of the RugbyWorks charity organisation, former captain of England, and 2016 inductee of the World Rugby Hall of Fame, Zenna Hopson, CEO and former board member at RugbyWorks charity organisation and Andrew Ridgeley, RugbyWorks patron and English singer, songwriter, musician and record producer.
