= Robin Leigh-Pemberton, Baron Kingsdown =

British banker and peer (1927–2013)

The Right Honourable The Lord Kingsdown KG JP PC
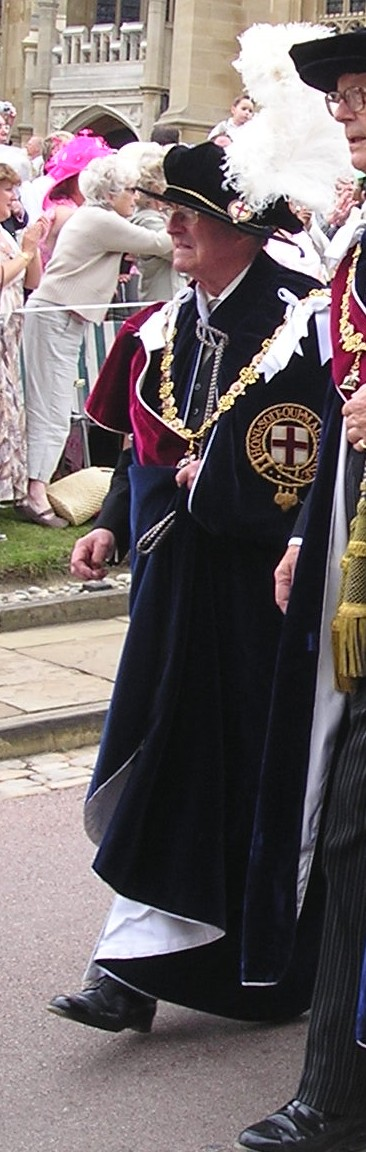
- Lord Kingsdown in the robes of a Knight Companion of the Order of the Garter

Governor of the Bank of England
- In office 1 July 1983 – 30 June 1993
- Appointed by: Nigel Lawson
- Preceded by: Gordon Richardson
- Succeeded by: Edward George

Member of the House of Lords
- Lord Temporal
- Life peerage 14 July 1993 – 24 November 2013

Personal details
- Born: 5 January 1927
- Died: 24 November 2013 (aged 86)
- Children: Hon. James Leigh-Pemberton
- Education: Trinity College, Oxford
- Profession: Economist
- Military career
- Allegiance: United Kingdom
- Branch: British Army
- Service years: 1945–1948
- Units: Grenadier Guards

Robert "Robin" Leigh-Pemberton, Baron Kingsdown (5 January 1927 – 24 November 2013) was a British life peer and banker, who served as Governor of the Bank of England from 1983 to 1993.

== Education and career ==
Leigh-Pemberton was educated at St Peter's Court, then at Eton College. He attended Trinity College, Oxford, graduating in 1950. In 1954, he was called to the Bar, and he practised law for several years before returning to Kent to manage the family estate of Torry Hill. He served as a Justice of the Peace and as Leader of Kent County Council. He eventually became chairman of the National Westminster Bank, then Governor of the Bank of England from 1983 until 1993.

=== Honours ===
He was appointed to the Privy Council in 1987, and created a life peer on 14 July 1993, as Baron Kingsdown, of Pemberton in the County of Lancashire. He became a Knight Companion of the Order of the Garter in 1994, and was also the Lord Lieutenant of Kent from 1982 to 2002. Between 1979 and 1992, he served as Honorary Colonel of the Kent and Sharpshooters Yeomanry and between 1977 and 1984 he served as Pro-chancellor of the University of Kent. He also served on the board of directors of the Bank of International Settlements.

== Personal life ==
His family has a long association with Kingsdown and Torry Hill, near Doddington, Kent, where he rebuilt the family mansion in the 1960s. It features a striking view north towards the Isle of Sheppey, the Swale and the Thames estuary. On the grounds of the estate, there is also what is believed to be the only Eton Fives court attached to a private dwelling; it was built in 1925. Lord Kingsdown's father also built a private miniature railway in the 1930s. This still runs for several miles on his estate.

One of his sons, James Leigh-Pemberton, continues the family's association with the Duchy of Cornwall (beginning with its Chancellor, the 1st Baron Kingsdown) as Receiver-General. His brother Jeremy Leigh-Pemberton was a deputy lieutenant of Kent, and was the parish chairman for the neighbouring parish of Wormshill. Another brother is the opera singer Nigel Douglas.

== Arms ==
Coat of arms of Robin Leigh-Pemberton, Baron Kingsdown, KG, PC
Coronet Coronet of a Baron Crest 1st: A Dragon’s Head Ermine, erased Gules, ducally gorged Or, and transfixed by an Arrow fesswise proper (Pemberton). 2nd: A Demi-Lion rampant Gules, charged on the shoulder with an Ermine Spot and holding between the paws a Lozenge Argent, thereon a Rose Gules, barbed and seeded proper (Leigh). Escutcheon Quarterly: 1st & 4th, Ermine, an Estoile Or, between three Buckets Sable, hoops and handles Gold (Pemberton); 2nd & 3rd, Gules, a Cross engrailed Argent, between four Lozenges Ermine (Leigh). Supporters Dexter: a Wyvern Ermine, ducally gorged Or, charged on the shoulder with an Estoile Gules. Sinister: a Lion Gules, charged on the shoulder with a Lozenge Argent, thereon an Ermine Spot Gules. Motto UT TIBI SIC ALTERI (Do to others as you would to yourself) Orders Order of the Garter (Appointed 1994)

== See also ==
- Kingsdown and Torry Hill
- Delors Committee

Government offices
Preceded by Gordon Richardson	Governor of the Bank of England; 1983–1993	Succeeded by Sir Edward George
Honorary titles
Preceded by The Lord Astor of Hever	Lord Lieutenant of Kent; 1982–2002	Succeeded by Allan Willett
