= André Spicer =

New Zealand business academic

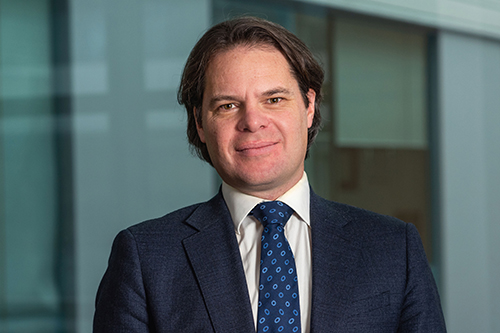
Spicer in 2021

André Spicer is a New Zealand academic, Dean, and Professor of Organisational Behaviour at Bayes Business School, City, University of London. He is an expert in the fields of Organisational Behaviour, Leadership and Corporate Social Responsibility, and is the founding director of ETHOS: The Centre for Responsible Enterprise at Bayes.

== Early life ==
Spicer was born and raised in Whangārei, New Zealand. He earned a bachelor's degree from the University of Otago, and a PhD from the University of Melbourne.

== Career ==
Spicer started his career at the University of Warwick and eventually became a professor of Organisation Studies there. He then became Professor of Organisational Behaviour at Bayes Business School, City, University of London. He was the founding director of ETHOS: The Centre for Responsible Enterprise there and the Head of the Faculty of Management.

His research on wellbeing, organizational politics, organisational culture, employee identity, new organizational forms, work space and leadership among other areas of expertise have been published in numerous top scholarly journals.

Spicer is the author of a number of books include The Wellness Syndrome, The Stupidity Paradox, Desperately Seeking Self Improvement and Business Bullshit.

He has written columns for the Guardian, the Financial Times, New Statesman and The Conversation.

Spicer has co-authored reports on the culture of banking and financial regulators.

On 1 December 2021, Spicer was named Bayes Business School's Interim Dean following the departure of Professor Paolo Volpin. In March 2022, Spicer was appointed as the permanent Dean.

== Publications ==
- Contesting the Corporation Struggle, Power and Resistance in Organizations (2007), co-written with Peter Fleming. ISBN 978-1107320963.
- Unmasking the Entrepreneur (2009), co-written with Campbell Jones. ISBN 978-1848448445.
- Metaphors We Lead By: Understanding Leadership in the Read World (2011), co-written with Mats Alvesson. ISBN 978-1136889431.
- Managing 'Human Resources' by Exploiting and Exploring People's Potentials (2013), co-written with Mikael Holmqvist. ISBN 978-1781905050.
- The Stupidity Paradox: The Power and Pitfalls of Functional Stupidity at Work (2016), co-written with Mats Alvesson.
- Desperately Seeking Self-Improvement: A Year Inside the Optimisation Movement (2017), co-written with Carl Cederström. ISBN 978-1682191026.
- Business Bullshit (2017).
- Wellness Syndrome (2015), (2017), co-written with Carl Cederström. ISBN 978-0745655611
- The Corporation: A Critical, Multi-Disciplinary Handbook (2017), co-written with Grietje Baars. ISBN 978-1139681025.
