= StreetDoctors =

Charitable organization

StreetDoctors is a United Kingdom charitable organisation that trains young people in emergency first aid knowledge to increase their confidence and willingness to take positive action at the scene of a violent attack or accident, for example if someone has been stabbed or knocked out.

== Overview ==
StreetDoctors was established in 2008 in Liverpool with a vision to reduce street violence by training young people to keep safe, save lives, and be part of the solution to the issue of street violence.

The training is provided by a community of young volunteers in the healthcare sector, including paramedics, doctors, and nurses. They collaborate closely with police departments and local community organizations.

Through their sessions, young people receive peer-to-peer first responder training, learning how to prevent loss of life and gaining the confidence to step forward to protect others. Also, they are educated about the physical and psychological implications of violence.
