= Jonathan Hiscock =

British hedge fund manager (born 1974)

- Born: April 1974 (age 52)
- Education: University of Oxford
- Occupation: Businessman
- Known for: Founder of GSA Capital

Jonathan Hiscock (born April 1974) is a British hedge fund manager and founder of GSA Capital, a London-based hedge fund.

According to The Sunday Times Rich List, Hiscock has a net worth of £350 million as of 2019.

== Early life and career ==
Hiscock studied mathematics at the University of Oxford. He previously worked for Deutsche Bank in proprietary trading.

== Career ==
In 2005, Hiscock founded GSA Capital Partners, which is based in London. It launched with two funds with $500 million under management. Hiscock launched GSA Capital Partners after carving out the Global Statistical Arbitrage unit at Deutsche Bank. When he set up the company, 15 employees from Deutsche Bank left at the same time to join Hiscock's firm.

According to The Independent, Hiscock modelled GSA Capital Partners "on idiosyncratic tech outfits such as Google rather than traditional finance houses".

In the year ending March 2015, GSA Capital Partner's revenues increased by 25 per cent to £146 million. Eighteen of the company's partners shared profits of £112.3 million.
