= Frank Warren (promoter) =

Boxing promoter (born 1952)

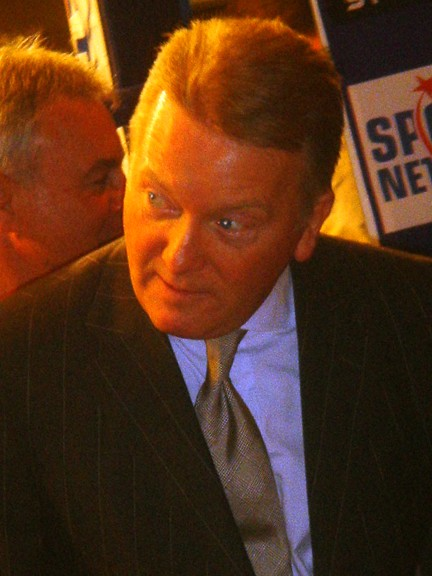
- Frank Warren in 2008
- Born: 28 February 1952 (age 74); Islington, London, England
- Occupation: Boxing promoter

Frank Warren (born 28 February 1952) is an English boxing manager and promoter and the founder of Queensberry Promotions. Warren was also a founder of the British boxing television channel BoxNation which ran for over 11 years from 2012.

Warren has promoted and managed world champions and top ranked fighters including Naseem Hamed, Frank Bruno, Tyson Fury, Josh Warrington, Joe Calzaghe, Nigel Benn, Billy Joe Saunders, Steve Collins, Chris Eubank, Agit Kabayel, Amir Khan and Ricky Hatton.

== Career ==
Warren was born in Islington on 28 February 1952. The son of a bookmaker, he trained as a solicitor's clerk with J Tickle & Co on Southampton Row in London.

Warren was approached by his second-cousin Lenny McLean who having just lost a fight and wanting a rematch, could not find a promoter. Warren agreed to become an unlicensed promoter, getting McLean a trainer who had worked with Chris Finnegan, and made the rematch at the Rainbow Theatre, Finsbury Park.

Warren's first licensed show was held at the Bloomsbury Crest Hotel, in London in 1980, promoting two unknown United States heavyweights. However, although he had arranged TV coverage, he was blocked from broadcasting the fight by the British Boxing Board of Control rules preventing first-timers from televising their first fights. However Warren was later given his first TV date with the BBC in a British light welterweight fight between London's champion Clinton McKenzie and Coventry contender Steve Early.

Warren soon became a leading figure in British boxing, and since has managed some of Britain's best boxers of the last twenty five years, including 'Prince' Naseem Hamed, Nigel Benn, Joe Calzaghe, Ricky Hatton, Derek Chisora, Nicky Piper and Amir Khan.

On 30 November 1989, Warren was shot outside the Broadway Theatre in Barking by an unknown assailant wearing a balaclava, who was never caught. A 9mm bullet from a Luger pistol missed Warren's heart by an inch, and he lost half a lung and parts of his ribs. The former boxer, Terry Marsh, who had become Warren's first world champion two years earlier, was accused of the shooting but acquitted by a jury.

Warren guided Hamed to become Britain's youngest ever world champion when he beat Steve Robinson to win the WBO Featherweight title at the Cardiff Arms Park, Wales, in 1995; he oversaw the ascent of Ricky Hatton to the IBF Light Welterweight Championship of the World after beating Kostya Tszyu in 2005; and has been with former IBF and WBO/WBC/WBA/Ring Magazine Super Middleweight Champion Joe Calzaghe throughout the majority of his 46 fight unbeaten career.

Warren signed the 2004 Olympic Lightweight silver medallist Amir Khan and guided him to be a world champion in 2009, but the two split in 2010. He continued this post-Olympic record by signing others after the 2008 Olympics.

In December 2007, Warren was elected to the International Boxing Hall of Fame and was inducted in June 2008.

On 5 February 2016, gunmen stormed the Regency Hotel in Whitehall, Dublin during a weigh-in for the WBO European lightweight title bout between Jamie Kavanagh and Antonio João Bento. The event was a co-promoted between Warren and suspected crime boss Daniel Kinahan.

In 2024, Warren led Team Queensberry in the Queensberry vs. Matchroom 5v5 event held in Riyadh, Saudi Arabia. This unique boxing competition saw Warren and fellow promoter Eddie Hearn each select five fighters to compete, with scoring based on two points for a knockout, one point for a decision win, and double points for victories by team captains. Hamzah Sheeraz captained Team Queensberry. Under Warren's leadership, his team achieved a clean sweep, winning all matches and delivering an embarrassing 10-0 scoreline against Hearn's team.

Warren was given a lifetime achievement award at the 2025 Sports Industry Awards in London in May 2025.

== Sports network ==
Warren's major vehicles for promotion are Sports Network Ltd and Sports Network Europe, which employ 15 people, but rises up to 1,000 on the day of a big fight. In 1995 Warren signed an exclusive deal with the pay-TV operator British Sky Broadcasting, but having moved his promotions successfully around all of the UK television networks, he has now severed all ties with Sky Sports.

After the loss of the dispute with Calzaghe, Sports Network Ltd was put into administration.

== BoxNation ==
In July 2011, Warren started the BoxNation TV channel alongside the Boxing Channel Media Limited group. The channel was originally free-to-air and only released on the Sky platform, but on 1 December 2011 BoxNation was broadcast on Virgin Media for the first time and became a subscription channel at the same time.

== Other interests ==
Warren was also the founder and owner of the London Arena. Beset by transport problems, he was about to raise additional finance until shot - he says the incident cost him £8million, as he was forced to sell it in 1996.

Warren also invested in Bedford RFC "Bedford Blues" during the 1996–97 season, taking over as chairman from Ian Bullerwell. According to Warren, he was persuaded to invest in Bedford, who were struggling near the bottom of the second tier. Warren admitted that the structure and governance of rugby were a "culture shock" compared to his boxing background, where deals were made directly without intermediaries or governing bodies. He criticised the traditional "badge and blazer mentality" prevalent in English rugby, stating it needed to be modernised without disregarding tradition. Legal difficulties, including a freezing of his assets due to a contractual dispute with boxing promoter Don King and the criminal conviction of a junior partner for theft from the club, forced Warren to relinquish ownership, selling the club for £1 to focus on its success rather than recovering his investment. Warren lost at least £2.5 million during this tenure. Speaking on the financial loss, he said, "I done my balls on it, and that was a lot of money back then." Despite the financial loss, he "loved every moment of it."

== Personal life ==
Warren is a fan of Arsenal F.C. He lives in Shephall, Hertfordshire with his family.

In September 2023 Warren joined the board of BoxWise, the UK’s boxing youth work charity.
