= Charles W. Major =

Bahamian high jumper (1904–1984)

Charlie Major
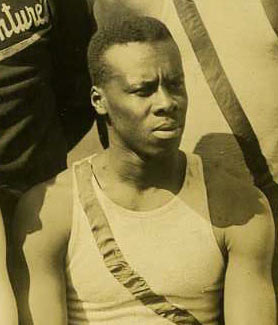

Personal information
- Born: 17 April 1904
- Died: 1984 (aged 79–80)
- Home town: Fowler Street, Nassau, Bahamas
- Education: St. Bonaventure University

Sport
- Country: Bahamas
- Sport: Sport of athletics
- Event: High jump
- College team: St. Bonaventure Bonnies

Achievements and titles
- Personal bests: HJ: 6 ft 7 1/2 in (2.01 m) (1929); PV: 12 ft 0 in (3.65 m); LJ: 22 ft 0 in (6.7 m); 400m: 52
- Updated on July 2024

Charles W. Major Sr. (17 April 1904 – 1984), also known as Charlie Major, was a Bahamian high jumper who also competed in the long jump and pole vault. He was active throughout the 1920s and 1930s and was considered one of the most influential sports figures in the U.S. collegiate system during that time.

== Career ==
As a high jumper, Major was a part of the St. Bonaventure Bonnies from 1927 to his graduation in 1934. He won several high-profile competitions, including the Millrose Games, New England Track and Field Championships, and the Metropolitan Championships. He also competed at the Penn Relays and the Boston Athletic Association Games.

Major won the USA Indoor Track and Field Championships, then run by the Amateur Athletic Union, two times, beating the reigning Olympic gold medallist in the process. His first win came in 1927 and his second was achieved in 1929, both at Madison Square Garden.

Major was a favorite for the U.S. team at the 1928 Olympics (the Bahamas was not recognized by the International Olympic Committee until the 1952 Games), but he was injured that year so he did not compete at the Olympic trials. His highest clearance was 6 ft 7 1/2 in (2.01 m) in 1929 at an outdoor track meet in New York.

== Personal life ==
At age 13 in 1917, Major left his hometown in Nassau, Bahamas by boat to travel to New York City. Landing in New York was "an out of this world experience" for him. After his time competing with the St. Bonaventure Bonnies, he went on to coach the team in 1933 and 1934.

After retiring from amateur athletics, Major worked in boxing as a manager, trainer, promoter and adviser to the Amateur Boxing Association. He returned home to the Bahamas in the 1940s. In his later life, he was credited with the establishment of the Thomas Robinson Stadium and bringing boxing and wrestling to the Bahamas. In 1969, he was inducted into the St. Bonaventure Bonnies Hall of Fame. In 1979, then-governor Hugh L. Carey issued a proclamation in Major's honor, declaring April 17 as "Charles W. Major Day" in New York.

On 31 May 1985, the "Charlie Major Track", a 400-meter eight-lane running track at St. Bonaventure University, was unveiled coinciding with a 10K run race in his honor. The track was funded using $30,000 from the St. Bonaventure class of 1934. As the Bonnies track and field program was discontinued, the track was demolished in 2004, but a memorial plaque was left. The Bonnies track program was re-established in 2017.
