= Bayes Business School =

Business school in London

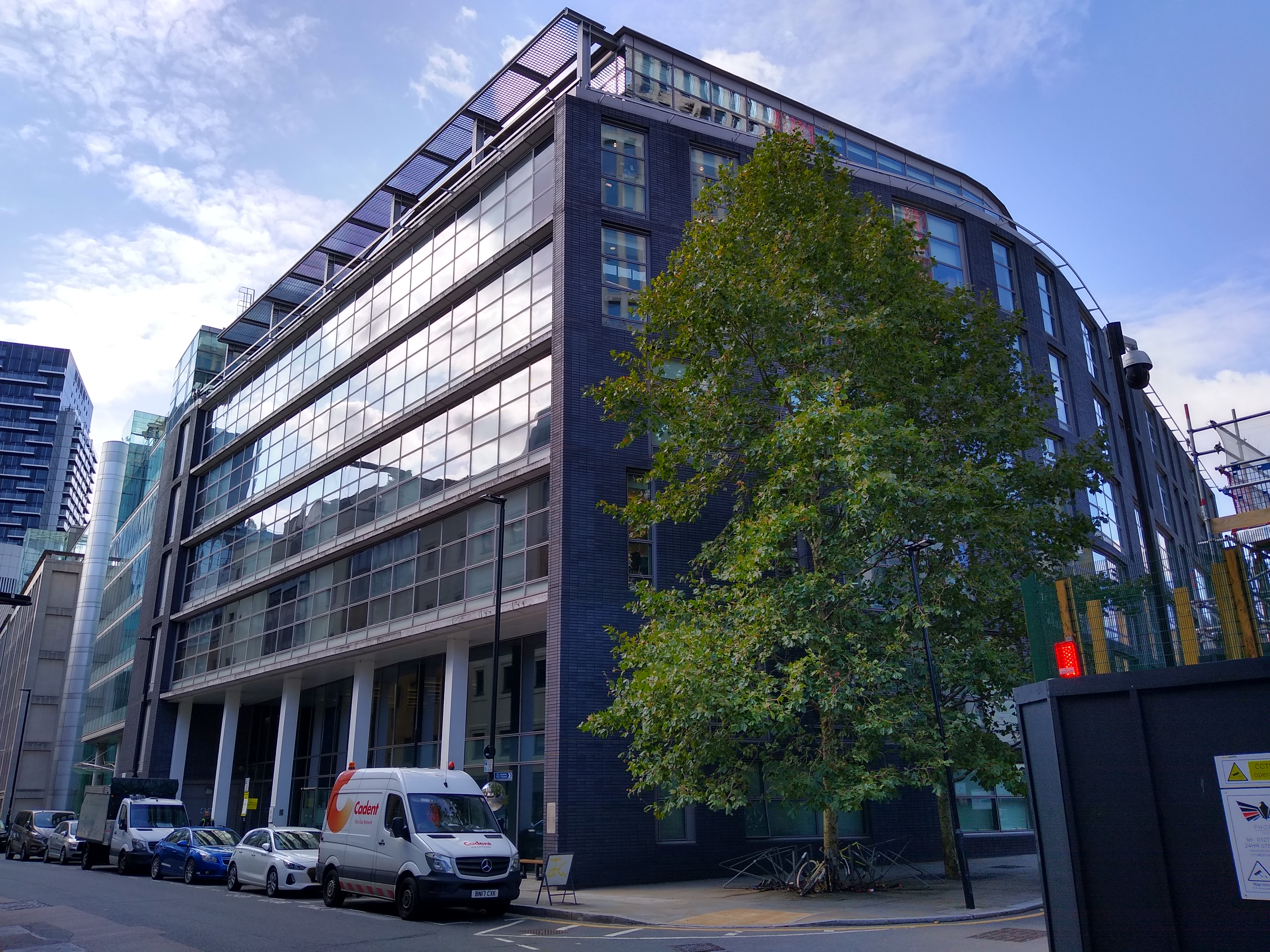
- Former names: Cass Business School; City Business School
- Type: Undergraduate, postgraduate, executive education, research
- Established: 1966
- Accreditation: AMBA, AACBS, EQUIS
- Dean: André Spicer
- Administrative staff: c. 500
- Students: c. 4,200
- Undergraduates: 2,200+
- Postgraduates: 1,850+
- Doctoral students: 100
- Location: London, England, United Kingdom; 51.5220°N 0.0900°W
- Campus: Urban
- Website: www.bayes.citystgeorges.ac.uk

Bayes Business School is the business school of City St George's, University of London. Established in 1966, it is located north of the City of London.

Bayes Business School is divided into the three faculties of actuarial science and insurance, finance, and management. It awards BSc (Hons), MSc, MBA, and PhD degrees and is one of around 100 schools globally to be triple accredited by the AMBA in the United Kingdom, EQUIS in Europe, the AACSB in the United States

The school was previously known as Cass Business School until it was renamed in 2021 after the statistician and theologian Thomas Bayes.

The Dean of Bayes Business School is Professor André Spicer.

== History ==
=== Foundation ===
The City University Business School ('CUBS') was founded in 1966 as part of City University, London. Its MSc in Administrative Sciences began in 1967 and became the MBA in 1979.

In 2002, following a donation from the Sir John Cass Foundation, the school moved to new premises in the London Borough of Islington and changed its name to Cass Business School.

This was part of a strategy formed by Lord Currie of Marylebone, who had been appointed Dean the year before, to compete as an international business school in a market dominated by US universities.

The School had previously been spread out across the City of London's mainly residential Barbican Centre development. The School is now predominantly based across two main buildings in Bunhill Row and Finsbury Square.

=== Name change ===
In July 2020, when Sir John Cass' links to the Atlantic Slave Trade came to light the decision to rename the School was made, on the basis that continued use of the Cass name was incompatible with City's values of diversity and inclusion. In April 2021 it was announced that the School would be renamed Bayes Business School on 6 September 2021, after Thomas Bayes, a nonconformist theologian and mathematician best known for his foundational work on conditional probability. Bayes is buried at Bunhill Fields in London, located near the business school. The name was adopted in 2021 following a consultation process, reflecting both the historical figure and the relevance of his work to modern data and decision-making.

== Academic programmes ==
=== Undergraduate degrees ===
The School has undergraduate degrees in areas including accounting, actuarial science, business and management, and finance with options for corporate internships, placement and study aboard available.

=== Masters degrees ===
The School has over 20 master's degree programmes in full-time, part-time and online formats, for subjects including insurance and risk management, investment management, corporate finance, banking and International finance, quantitative finance, shipping, marketing, actuarial science, supply chain, energy, trade and finance, property valuation, mathematical trading, real estate, international accounting and finance, finance and investment, entrepreneurship, charity management, and business analytics.

Bayes operates full-time MBA and executive MBA programmes in London, as well as a flexible online Global MBA programme. The full-time programme is completed in one year and the executive and online programmes in two years.

=== PhD and Executive PhD ===
The School offers PhDs in areas including Accounting, Actuarial Science, Finance and Management. An Executive PhD programme is designed for senior executives working in industry, government and non-for-profit sectors.

=== Executive education ===
Executive Education programmes at Bayes Business School include Leadership, Finance, Insurance and Personal Development.

== School rankings ==
Bayes Business School has received the following rankings:

- Bayes Business School is now ranked 2nd in London, 6th in the UK, and 34th in Europe according to the Financial Times European Business School Ranking 2025
- Bayes was ranked 5th in the UK for business and management research with a total of 92 per cent of its research rated as world-leading (4*) or internationally excellent (3*) (The Research Excellence Framework 2021)
- The School ranks 5th in the UK for Finance Research, and 8th in the UK for Management (ShanghaiRanking's Global Ranking of Academic Subjects 2024)
- Bayes is 1st in Europe for Actuarial Science research (UNL Business School Actuarial Science Rankings 2024)

=== Full-time MBA rankings ===
- 1st in London for both value for money and graduate employment within 3 months (Financial Times Global MBA Ranking 2025).
- 7th in the UK, 21st in Europe (FInancial Times Global MBA ranking 2025)
- 3rd in London, 5th in the UK, 51st globally (LinkedIn Top MBA 2025)
- 2nd in the UK, 6th in Europe and 22nd globally for Entrepreneurship (Poets and Quants World's Best MBA Programmes for Entrepreneurship 2025)
- 8th in the UK, 24th in Europe (Poets and Quants International MBA 2026 ranking).

=== Online MBA rankings ===
- 4th in the world and 3rd in the UK and 2nd in London (Financial Times online MBA ranking 2026)
- 1st globally for Faculty and Teaching (QS Online MBA ranking 2026)
- 6th in the UK, 8th in Europe, 21st globally (QS Online MBA ranking 2026)

=== Executive MBA ===
- 3rd in London, 6th in the UK, 21st in Europe and 53rd globally (QS Global Executive MBA rankings 2025)
- 6th in UK and 44th globally (Financial Times EMBA ranking 2026)

=== MSc in Finance ===
- 3rd best in the UK and 16th globally (Financial Times Masters in Finance ranking 2026)
- 1st globally for alumni salary increases, 1st in the UK for alumni career progression (Financial Times Masters in Finance ranking 2026)

=== MSc in Management ===
- 3rd in the UK, 48th globally (Financial Times Masters in Management ranking 2026)
- 2nd in the UK for alumni salary increases (Financial Times Masters in Management ranking 2026)

=== Undergraduate programmes ===
- 4th in London, 13th in the UK for Business and Management Studies (Complete University Guide)
- 2nd in London, top ten in the UK for Accounting and Finance (Complete University Guide 2025)
- 6th in the UK, 2nd in London for Accounting and Finance (Times Good University Guide 2026)
- 3rd in London, 20th in the UK for Accounting and Finance (Guardian University Guide 2026)
- 2nd in London, 11h in the UK for Marketing (Guardian University Guide 2026)

== Research ==
Prominent Research Centres at Bayes Business School include:

- The Costas Grammenos Centre for Shipping, Trade and Finance.
- The Centre for Charity Effectiveness
- The Real Estate Centre
- The Centre for Banking Research
- The Mergers and Acquisitions Research Centre

== Events ==
Bayes Business School hosts a range of academic, professional and public events and prestigious guest speakers from academia and practice. These include recurring lecture series and conferences organised by the School and its research centres such as:

Mais Lecture – an annual public lecture series on banking and finance. Past speakers have included UK government ministers, central bank governors, and international policy makers.

Craft Lecture – a lecture series set up following the Bayes name change in 2023 to create a space to reflect on topics of inequality and social justice.

M&A Conference – an academic conference dedicated to mergers and acquisitions research, hosted by the M&A Research Centre.

Henry Thornton Lecture – an academic lecture traditionally delivered by global researchers on monetary theory and monetary policy.

Portal Trust Education Lecture – an annual lecture inaugurated in 2021 to discuss important education topics of the day.

== Notable alumni ==
The school's alumni association has more than 38,000 members in 160 countries.

- William Castell – Chairman of the Wellcome Trust; a director of General Electric and BP; former CEO of Amersham plc
- Peter Cullum – British entrepreneur
- Tobias Ellwood – Conservative Member of Parliament and chair of the Defence Select Committee
- George Brooksbank – CEO of Fairway Capital
- Stelios Haji-Ioannou – founder of easyGroup
- Tom Ilube – philanthropist, physicist and chair of the RFU
- Bob Kelly – former CEO of Bank of New York Mellon, Mellon Financial Corporation and Wachovia Corporation
- Muhtar Kent – CEO of The Coca-Cola Company; former president and COO of Coca-Cola International and Executive Vice President of The Coca-Cola Company
- Jonathan Kestenbaum, Baron Kestenbaum – chief operating officer of investment trust RIT Capital Partners, and a Labour member of the House of Lords
- Liu Mingkang – former chairman of the China Banking Regulatory Commission
- Barrie Pettman – co-founder and chairman emeritus of the Emerald Group Publishing; President Emeritus of Burke's Peerage
- Syed Ali Raza – president and chairman of the National Bank of Pakistan
- Set Aung – politician, economist and management consultant, incumbent deputy planning and finance minister of Myanmar
- Martin Wheatley – former chief executive of the UK Financial Conduct Authority
- Jeff Wooller – British accountant
- Ruth Yeoh – Malaysian environmentalist and businesswoman
- Jay Shetty – Internet Personality and Motivational Speaker
- Evan Edinger – American-born YouTuber based in London, England
- Jihan Abass – Kenyan entrepreneur, business woman, CEO and founder of Lami Insurance Technology and Griffin Insurance
- Nick Maughan – British investor and philanthropist.
- Sonya Barlow – Pakistani-British entrepreneur.
- Jayne-Anne Gadhia - former CEO of Virgin Money
