= Deforestation in Colombia =

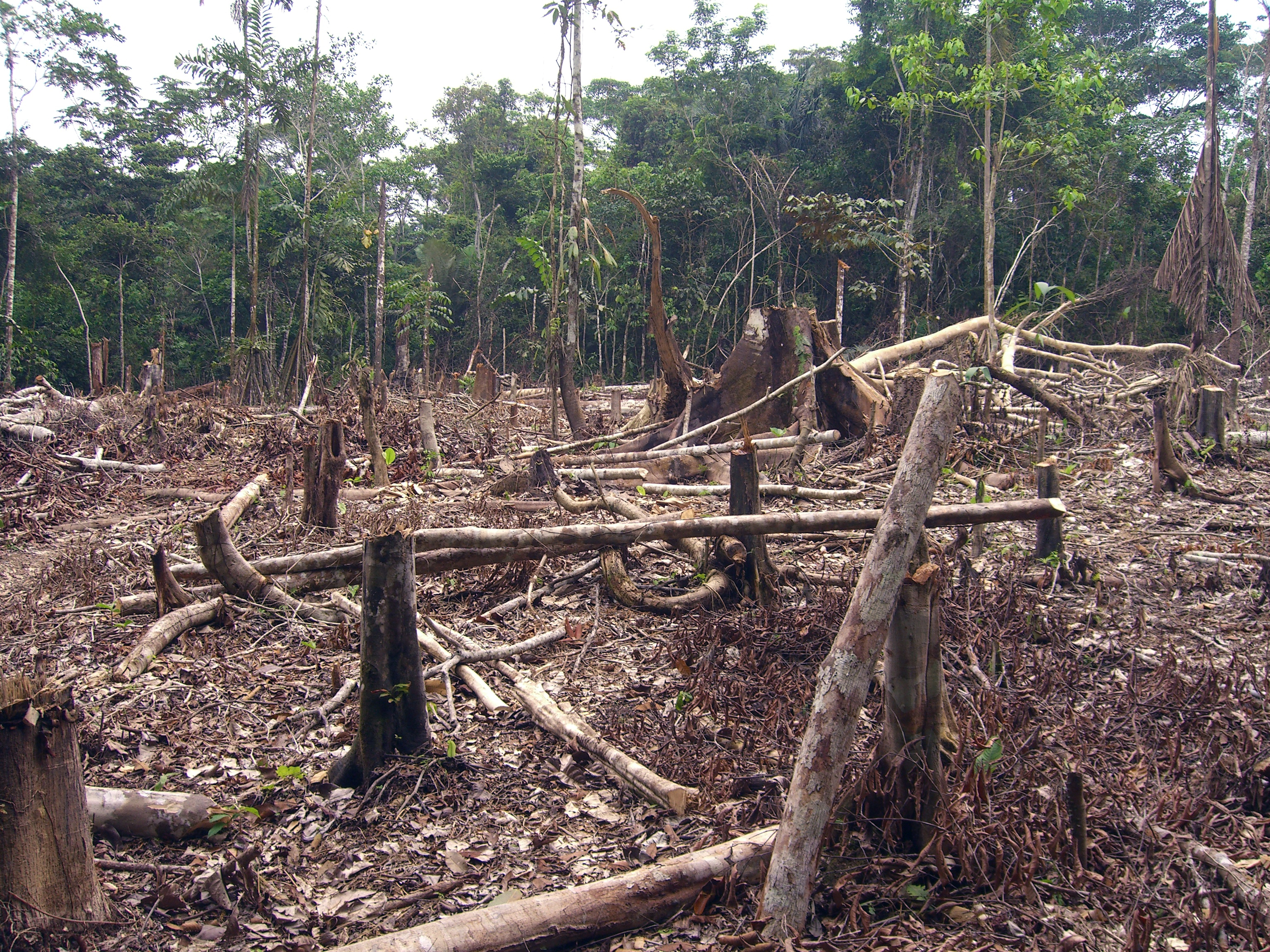
The results of slash-and-burn agriculture in the Colombian Amazon

Colombia loses 2,000 km^{2} of forest annually to deforestation, according to the United Nations in 2003. Some suggest that this figure is as high as 3,000 km^{2} due to illegal logging in the region. Deforestation results mainly from logging for timber, small-scale agricultural ranching, mining, development of energy resources such as hydroelectricity, infrastructure, cocaine production, and farming.

Deforestation in Colombia is mainly targeted at primary rainforests. This has a profound ecological impact in that Colombia is extremely rich in biodiversity, with 10% of the world's species, making it the second most biologically diverse country on Earth.

In 2024, deforestation in Colombia's Amazon region has increased by 40% during the first quarter compared to the same period last year, according to a report. This rise in deforestation is occurring amidst the influence of a strong El Niño weather phenomenon, causing dry and hot conditions that have led to droughts and fires throughout Colombia.

== Causes and effects ==
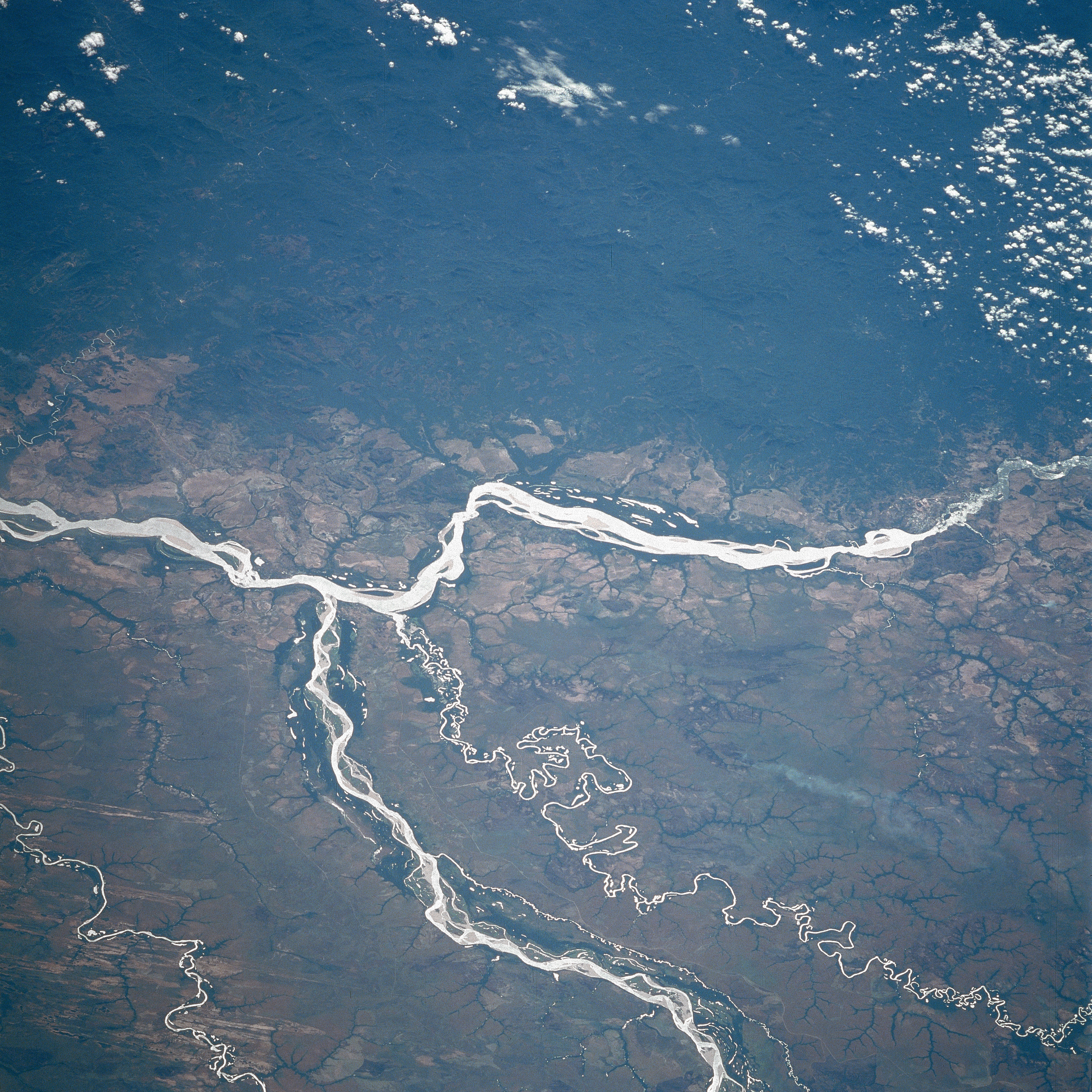
Soil disturbance associated with deforestation in Colombia affects rivers such as the Orinoco and Meta through increased siltation and sedimentation that affects both water levels and aquatic biodiversity.

A contributing factor to deforestation in Colombia is the national Plan Pacifico which is intended to raise revenue to develop the economy. The plan includes exploitation of Colombia's rainforests for the extraction of precious natural resources for exportation.

Under the regime of President Virgilio Barco Vargas (1986–1990), a development scheme was initiated involving $4.5 billion in investments to develop the Colombian Pacific Coast in Choco Department. Around 2.2% of the total forest area in Colombia began to be removed each year for wood and to make paper or to provide the clearings needed for palm plantations and agricultural production and commercial shrimp farming. In a concerted effort to enhance trade, Plan Pacifico has attempted to complete the 54 kilometer missing section of the Pan-American Highway between Colombia and Panama spanning the ecologically rich Darién Gap.

The construction of the Puente Terrestre Inter-Oceanico (PTI), the land bridge between the Pacific and Atlantic Oceans near Panama, consisting of a railway, road, canal, and oil pipeline has had a major impact on the environment and forest removal in the region. Other plans for road construction throughout Chocó which intended to catapult economic production in Colombia have had unintended negative consequences.

Deforestation has been responsible for the erosion of riverbanks which have affected the levels of river beds, which has had negative effects on aquatic life and fish stocks as well as on transportation and navigation because of silting. This forest clearing also accounts for great habitat destruction for creatures dwelling in the Colombian forests. For example, the cotton-top tamarin is considered to be critically endangered, and ranks highly on the list of "The World's 25 Most Endangered Primates." Habitat destruction through forest clearing is the main cause of this collapse, and cotton-top tamarins have lost more than three-quarters of their original habitat to deforestation. Local initiatives, like Proyecto Tití for cotton-top tamarins, have been created to raise awareness of such cases.

The current administration is expanding palm oil and sugar cane production by encouraging large scale plantations, and demand for agrofuels has also had a significant impact on Colombia's forests, biodiversity, and local communities. Exploitation of communities through palm oil expansion has often resulted in violence and abuse of human rights. NGOs working in Colombia have recorded 113 deaths as a result of land-based conflicts over palm oil production in Curvaradó and Jiguamiandó River Basin in the Chocó region, where paramilitaries associated with plantation companies have been accused of exploiting lands collectively held by Afro-Colombian communities. The coastal lowland forests of Chocó province that are most affected by palm oil production are amongst the most biodiverse forests on Earth, home to 7,000 to 8,000 species, with over 2,000 endemic plant species and 100 endemic bird species. Mining has also contributed to deforestation, particularly in the recent years, representing up to 6% of national deforestation (2017), with large clear cuts observed in legal concessions of Antioquia (gold producer) or La Guajira (coal producer).

The biologically rich forests of Colombia's Pacific Coast have also been affected by gold mining and cocoa production. One figure obtained in the mid-1990s estimated that gold mining activities were responsible for the clearance of 800 square kilometres of forest per year in Colombia, in addition to increased siltation in rivers and mercury contamination.

The cultivation, production, and distribution of illegal narcotics in Colombia has also had a profound impact on deforestation and loss of biodiversity in the country. An estimated 400 km^{2} (100,000 acres) are allocated each year to grow coca, marijuana, and opium poppies resulting in the direct removal of primary forest to provide for the trade. Particularly affected are the forests of the Colombian Andes where at least 73% of this precious ecosystem has been affected by drug cultivation and migration of people for illegal resource extraction. The area is of prime importance for Colombia's water supply, and a disruption of soils and the water table arising from the removal of forest cover is of major concern to the climatic patterns of the country.

Poverty and inequality in land tenure and use also play a role in deforestation in Colombia. Landowners who make up 3% of Colombia's population own over 70% of arable land, while 57% of the poor farmers barely survive on 2.8% of the land. The fact that Colombia is attempting to expand its market economy with cash crops for export to generate income, increasing the marginalization of farmers at a local level, makes inequality and poverty there worse.

== Response ==
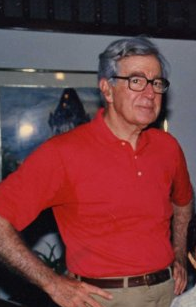
President Virgilio Barco Vargas initiated the Plan Pacifico development scheme to develop the economy of Colombia's Pacific Coast in the late 1980s with a major impact on forest.

Colombia has made great strides in protecting vast areas of land from deforestation through the creation of national parks; however, enforcement is by no means completely effective. The sale of protected land through government corruption is not uncommon. One notorious example is the attempted government conversion of the Tayrona forest on Colombia's Atlantic Coast into a national park in 1980. The Great Alliance against Deforestation is an initiative formed by the private sector and the Ministry of Environment and Sustainable Developing. The initiative counts on the help of different sectors of the civil society, including artists like Systema Solar and Bomba Estéreo.

Colombia has abundant biodiversity and ecosystems in the world, and there are thousands of plant and animal species that live there. Under the country's first leftist administration led by President Gustavo Petro, rampant deforestation has been constrained and reversed. The Petro administration prioritized enhanced monitoring and sustainable projects as core strategies for protecting the Amazon rainforest, while requiring wealthy nations to cancel foreign debt in exchange for climate change mitigation efforts. The two key successful initiatives by the Colombian government include compensation agreements with farmers to protect land and negotiations with armed groups that controlled deforestation places. Columbia has found a direct correlation between peace and deforestation outcomes, which is that a peaceful environment effectively reduces deforestation.

The country's Ministry of Environment announced that deforestation in Colombia dropped significantly in 2023, reaching its lowest level in 23 years. The Official data show that forest loss decreased from 1235 square kilometers in 2022 to 792 square kilometers in 2023, representing a 36% reduction. 2023 marked the second consecutive year of decreasing deforestation in Colombia, where the forest loss decreased by 54% between 2021 and 2023, far exceeding the national target of 20% shown by official data. The Colombian Environment Minister commented that “2023 was a milestone year in the fight against deforestation.”

== Tree cover extent and loss ==
Global Forest Watch publishes annual estimates of tree cover loss and 2000 tree cover extent derived from time-series analysis of Landsat satellite imagery in the Global Forest Change dataset. In this framework, tree cover refers to vegetation taller than 5 m (including natural forests and tree plantations), and tree cover loss is defined as the complete removal of tree cover canopy for a given year, regardless of cause.

For Colombia, country statistics report cumulative tree cover loss of 5,602,696 ha (56,026.96 km^{2}) from 2001 to 2024 (about 6.8% of its 2000 tree cover area). For tree cover density greater than 30%, country statistics report a 2000 tree cover extent of 81,854,356 ha (818,543.56 km^{2}). The charts and table below display this data. In simple terms, the annual loss number is the area where tree cover disappeared in that year, and the extent number shows what remains of the 2000 tree cover baseline after subtracting cumulative loss. Forest regrowth is not included in the dataset.

Annual tree cover loss in Colombia, 2001–2024. View chart definition.
Tree cover extent in 2000 minus cumulative tree cover loss in Colombia, 2001–2024 (loss-only residual; does not account for gain). View chart definition.

Annual tree cover extent and loss
Year	Tree cover extent (km2) (Note: This residual measure does not include forest regrowth.)	Annual tree cover loss (km2)
2001	816,243.95	2,299.61
2002	814,421.60	1,822.35
2003	813,197.62	1,223.98
2004	810,658.96	2,538.66
2005	808,772.06	1,886.90
2006	806,873.08	1,898.98
2007	804,182.80	2,690.28
2008	801,865.32	2,317.48
2009	799,488.13	2,377.19
2010	797,518.24	1,969.89
2011	795,620.23	1,898.01
2012	793,344.39	2,275.84
2013	791,955.74	1,388.65
2014	789,935.46	2,020.28
2015	788,526.24	1,409.22
2016	785,617.56	2,908.68
2017	781,371.13	4,246.43
2018	777,848.94	3,522.19
2019	775,164.18	2,684.76
2020	771,922.15	3,242.03
2021	769,270.54	2,651.61
2022	766,613.24	2,657.30
2023	764,646.90	1,966.34
2024	762,516.60	2,130.30

== REDD+ forest reference levels and monitoring ==
Colombia has submitted forest reference emission levels (FRELs) under the UNFCCC REDD+ framework, which are used as benchmarks for results-based finance and are subject to UNFCCC technical assessment. On the UNFCCC REDD+ Web Platform, Colombia is listed as having reported a national REDD+ strategy and safeguards information summaries (related to the Cancún safeguards), and having assessed reference levels; the platform lists a national forest monitoring system as reported for Colombia’s 2015 and 2020 submissions (and “not reported” for the 2024 submission).

Colombia’s first assessed FREL (submitted in 2014 and assessed in 2015) was a subnational benchmark for the Colombian Amazonia biome, developed as an interim step toward a national FREL/forest reference level. The technical assessment reported an assessed FREL of 51,599,618.7 t CO2 eq per year for 2013–2017, based on average historical CO2 emissions from gross deforestation over 2000–2012 and including an upward 10% adjustment for national circumstances. The FREL included above- and below-ground biomass carbon pools and CO2 only, excluding other pools and non-CO2 gases. The UNFCCC REDD+ Web Platform notes that Colombia later revised this Amazonia-biome FREL to 51,612,072.9 t CO2 eq per year in the technical annex to its first biennial update report to correct a calculation error.

Colombia subsequently submitted national FRELs. The technical assessment of the 2020 submission reported a time-varying national FREL for deforestation (reference period 2008–2017), with assessed values of 120,770,431.44 t CO2 eq for 2018 increasing to 140,732,334.73 t CO2 eq for 2022; the submission included living biomass (above- and below-ground) and soil organic carbon in mineral soils and applied an adjustment for national circumstances using a logistic model. In 2024, Colombia updated its national FREL to cover both deforestation and forest degradation (reference period 2013–2022), with assessed values from 143,661,671 t CO2 eq for 2023 to 154,625,265 t CO2 eq for 2027; the technical assessment reported average uncertainty of 9.79% for deforestation emissions over 2013–2022 (25.30% for forest degradation).

== La Minga Indígena ==
In January 2020, the Colombian government consulted with indigenous Amazonian tribal communities for suggestions on how to spend over $7 million to fight deforestation in the Amazon. However, protests have since broken out across Colombia by La Minga Indígena, thousands of indigenous activists demanding more proactive implementation of the peace agreement to promote environmental protections. Indigenous people worldwide have made essential contributions to the pursuing of environmental justice.

These indigenous groups are acting as environmental protectors and land defenders for the Amazon from deforestation. “Minga” is the Quechua word meaning the coming together of strangers around a shared objective or goal. Indigenous protestors are requesting legal protections and defense for Mother Earth after human and environmental rights violations.

Deforestation and land grabbing increased by 44% since the peace agreement between FARC and the government was signed in 2016, after which FARC withdrew from the forests. FARC enforced an environmental ‘gunpoint conservation policy’ where farmers (often indigenous) had to maintain a portion of their lands forested, or risked violent repercussions. The peace agreement intended to reduce violence in the Amazon, but facilitated land grabbing for illicit crop growth (cocaine) and gold mining by former FARC dissidents, leading to violence against indigenous communities and illegal deforestation.

Deforestation reduces Amazon biodiversity and illegal activities pollute rivers and natural habitats to species and indigenous groups. Since 2016, over 300 indigenous leaders and 600 peasant, Afro and union leaders have been killed in Colombia. La Minga Indígena is receiving political support by Claudia López for more proactive implementation of the peace agreement to enforce protections against illegal deforestation.

== See also ==
- Environmental issues in Colombia
