= Charlie Bynar =

American painter

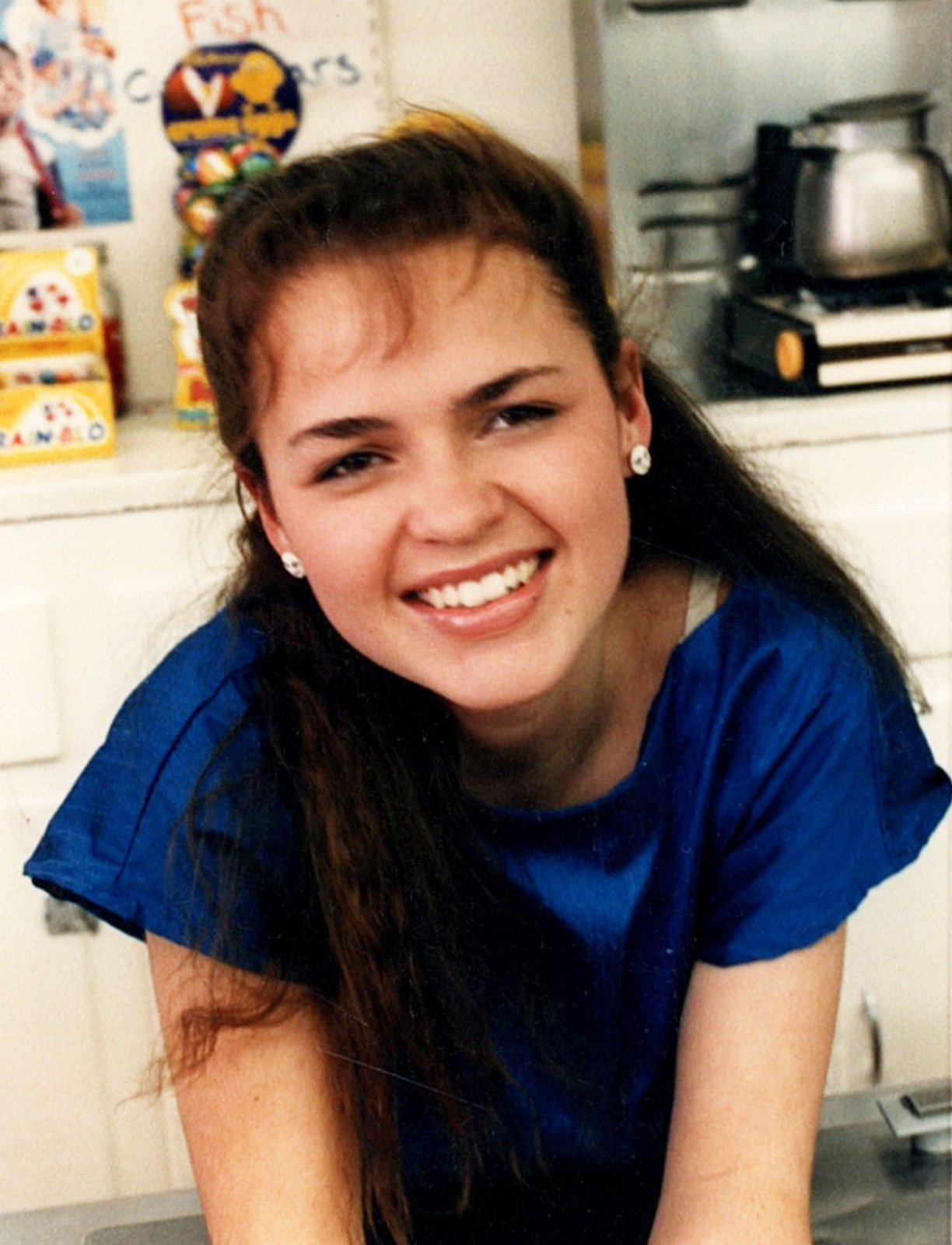
- Born: 1966 (age 59–60); Sun Valley, Idaho
- Occupations: artist, author, nurse, philanthropist, and founder of Isaac's Ant Foundation.
- Spouse(s): David Calley (m. 1993; div. 2009); Chris Kirkendal (m.2015; died 2020)

Charlie Bynar (born 1966) is an American award-winning author, international artist, nurse, ant keeper, and philanthropist known for her contributions to environmental protection, visual art, literature, science-based scholarships for individuals with disabilities, and science education outreach.

Her artwork gained international recognition when her portrait of David Bowie was featured in the David Bowie Is exhibition organized by the Victoria and Albert Museum. Her David Bowie portrait is part of David Bowie’s archives at the Victoria and Albert Museum’s permanent exhibition, David Bowie Centre.

Following the death of her son, she and her husband, Chris, founded Isaac’s Ant Foundation, a nonprofit dedicated to education and public engagement through ant exhibits installed across the United States, including at the American Museum of Natural History. Additionally, Bynar is the author of children’s and nonfiction works, including Charlie and the Rainbow Trout (2021) and Through the Darkness: A Story of Love from the Other Side (2025), an award-winning narrative nonfiction book.

== Biography ==
She was born in Sun Valley, Idaho, to a hospital housekeeper and a miner who was also a painter. Her early exposure to both working-class life and artistic practice shaped her artistic development. Bynar received the Scholastic Art Award in 1983 and 1984. She later established herself in Flagstaff, Arizona, where she began exhibiting her work and building a base of patrons through commissioned portraiture and exhibitions.

Bynar established herself as a visual artist with international exposure. Her portrait of David Bowie was selected for inclusion in David Bowie Is, a major traveling exhibition organized by the Victoria and Albert Museum that toured globally over a five-year period. This exhibition significantly contributed to her recognition within the contemporary art community. Bynar began exhibiting her work publicly in 1988 at Macy’s Coffee Shop and Gallery in Flagstaff, Arizona, where she developed a following and received portrait commissions. Later, she exhibited works in Flagstaff at the Hudgens Gallery and the Coconino Center For The Arts.

Bynar largely works in watercolors, but also in other media. Over the following decades, she exhibited her work across the United States, including at Robinson Gallery in Key West, Florida, and Los Angeles, California (1992–1998); the National Association of Women Artists (NAWA) in New York (1997); Jefferson Studios in Phoenix, Arizona; Hidden Beauty Gallery and the Coconino Center for the Arts in Flagstaff, Arizona (2000); Kestler Gallery in Bend, Oregon (2002); and Sprigg Gallery in California (2003).

== Writing ==
Bynar is also an author whose work spans children’s literature and narrative nonfiction. Her first children’s book, Charlie and the Rainbow Trout (2021), marked her entry into publishing. She later authored Through the Darkness: A Story of Love from the Other Side, a work of narrative nonfiction centered on themes of grief, resilience, and healing.

== Artworks ==
Charlie Bynar’s artistic output includes portraiture and mixed media, with her David Bowie portrait among her most recognized pieces, featured in a major international exhibition. Her artistic style often reflects detailed observational work and thematic depth, aligning with broader cultural and musical influences. In addition to gallery exhibitions, her work has contributed to educational and commemorative initiatives, particularly through collaborations linked to her foundation’s outreach programs.

== Personal life ==
Bynar married her husband, David Calley, in 1993, with whom she had one child, Isaac. Calley is the founder of Southwest Windpower. In 2015, Bynar married Chris Kirkendall, who died of cancer in 2020. Her son, Isaac Bynar Calley, died at the age of sixteen following a seizure related to a hypoxic brain injury caused by medical negligence at birth. His interest in ants and passion for learning inspired Isaac’s Ant Foundation. Bynar’s personal experiences with loss and resilience have significantly influenced her writing and philanthropic work.

== Philanthropy and foundation work ==
Following the death of her son, Isaac Bynar Calley, Bynar co-founded Isaac’s Ant Foundation, a nonprofit organization dedicated to science education and public engagement through ant exhibits and outreach programs. The foundation has installed educational exhibits across the United States, including collaborations with institutions such as the American Museum of Natural History, and promotes ecological awareness through the study of social insect systems.

In addition to its educational initiatives, Bynar and the foundation have established endowed scholarships for individuals with disabilities at Northern Arizona University and Coconino Community College.

Bynar's environmental conservation philanthropy includes contributions to the World Land Trust, Painted Dog Conservation, and the World Wildlife Fund. Additional contributions have been made through Isaac’s Ant Foundation in support of reforestation efforts.

== Awards ==
- 2025 National Indie Excellence Award (Winner, Death & Dying category)
- 2025 Independent Author Network (IAN) Book of the Year Award (Winner, Mind/Body/Spirit category)
- 2025 Independent Author Network (IAN) Book of the Year Award (Finalist, Grief/Hardship category)
- 1983 Scholastic Art Award
- 1984 Scholastic Art Award
