= Spectacled Bear Conservation Society =

Team of researchers

Spectacled Bear Conservation
- Founded: 2006
- Type: Non-profit organization
- Purpose: Spectacled bear conservation
- Location: Peru
- Key people: Robyn Appleton, (Founder and President); Alexander Moore (Executive Director); Javier Vallejos Guerrero, (Field Team Leader)
- Website: sbc-peru.org

Spectacled Bear Conservation (SBC) is a team of researchers and conservationists working to study and protect the endangered spectacled bear (Tremarctos ornatus), also known as the Andean bear. Spectacled bears are the only surviving species of bear native to South America, and the only surviving member of the subfamily Tremarctinae, the short-faced bears. Their range is the Andean Mountains from Venezuela to Chile.

== History ==
The organization began in 2006 when Canadian conservation biologist Robyn Appleton recognized that little research had been done on the spectacled bear. She connected with former hunter turned conservationist Javier Vallejos to go into the field and conduct the first observational study on wild spectacled bears. They discovered the first active maternal den site, and fitted the first wild Peruvian spectacled bear with a GPS collar. The organization was formally established as a Canadian non-profit in 2009.

== Programs ==
=== Research ===
SBC conducts research to better understand the behaviors, range, foraging, mating, dispersal, and reproductive ecology of the spectacled bear. This is done using camera traps, GPS-satellite collars, remote video surveillance and collection of genetic samples such as hair. In the summer of 2023, SBC began a two-year study of the spectacled bear population in the Machu Picchu historical sanctuary. The project is being done in conjunction with the Peruvian government. The data from camera traps, bear collaring, and continued monitoring will help balance decisions for conservation actions and the growing tourism activities in the area.

=== Conservation outreach ===
SBC staff spends time training local people in research methods and in 2010 the El Centro de Conservación de Batán Grande (Conservation Centre of Batán Grande) was established as a place for local educators and conservationists to conduct workshops and presentations for local villagers. SBC also formed a cooperative of women who live in Batan Grande that produce hand-felted animals to financially assist the local community as well as connect it with the conservation efforts. In October 2015 Robyn Appleton representing the Spectacled Bear Conservation Society - Peru, was a featured guest speaker at the annual Wildlife Conservation Network Expo and in 2016, SBC was formally introduced as an official WCN partner.

=== Protection of habitat ===
In part due to SBC's discoveries and outreach efforts, the Peruvian government established a wildlife refuge, El Parque Arqueológico y Ecológico de Batán Grande which joins another protected park in hopes of extending a conservation corridor.

== See also ==
- Spectacled bear
- Wildlife Conservation Network
- Conservation movement
- Environmental movement
- Natural environment
- Sustainability
