= Painted Dog Conservation =

Organization

- Type: Non-profit Organization
- Purpose: Conservation of painted dogs
- Location: Hwange National Park, Zimbabwe
- Key people: Gregory Rasmussen (founder); Peter Blinston (managing director)
- Website: painteddog.org - painteddog.co.uk/

Painted Dog Conservation was founded in 1992 by wildlife conservation biologist Greg Rasmussen for the protection of the painted dogs (Lycaon pictus) and their habitat. Rasmussen served as the organization’s executive director until 2013. He later founded Painted Dog Research (PDR), where he currently serves as executive director.

Painted Dog Conservation works to engage and incorporate local communities in protecting painted dogs in Zimbabwe. The painted dog, or African wild dog, was once common in Africa with estimates of over half a million spread among 39 countries. Current estimates put their numbers at about 3,000 only found in Tanzania, Zambia, Mozambique, Zimbabwe, Botswana and South Africa. Since PDC's creation, Zimbabwe's wild dog population has increased from 400 to 700 individuals. Painted Dog Conservation is partnered with the Wildlife Conservation Network.

== Programs ==
=== Collars and road signs ===
Painted Dog Conservation uses catch-and-release techniques and places colored collars on the dogs to demonstrate to local ranchers that the dogs are few in numbers and have convinced many of them to not shoot at the dogs. The reflective collars, combined with signs at key crossing areas, have reduced road collisions by 50%.

=== Anti-poaching units ===
Painted Dog Conservation has created anti-poaching units staffed by locals to provide protection, gather data and collect poaching snares.

=== Snare wire art ===
The snares collected by the anti-poaching units are given to local community artists who turn them into animal sculptures. Through sales of these snares and other crafts they spread the conservation message of the painted dogs both to their own community and internationally.

=== Monitoring ===
Painted Dog Conservation uses radio collars to collect information about pack movements. This information contributes to their relocation to predator-friendly areas and to expand their range when needed.

=== Rehabilitation ===
A Painted Dog Conservation rehabilitation facility is available for injured painted dogs until they can be re-released into the wild.

=== Bush camp ===
Painted Dog Conservation holds a free environmental bush camp for local 6th-grade school children by local guides in hopes of inspiring them in conservation.

=== Visitors center ===
Painted Dog Conservation's visitor center was completed in 2007. The center offers an education facility including a painted dog viewing platform and an interpretive hall.
