= Andean Cat Alliance =

South American research and conservationalist group

- Founded: 1999
- Type: Non-profit organization
- Purpose: Andean mountain cat conservation
- Region served: Argentina, Bolivia, Chile and Peru
- Key people: Lilián Villalba (General Coordinator)
- Website: gatoandino.org

The Andean Cat Alliance (Alianza Gato Andino; AGA) is a network of researchers and conservationists working to study and protect the Andean cat (Leopardus jacobita) and its habitat in Argentina, Bolivia, Chile and Peru. It is partnered with the Wildlife Conservation Network, and has developed a strategic plan for conservation of the species.

== Organization ==
AGA was founded in 1999, and comprises around 25 professional biologists and other scientists.

== Andean cat ==
The Andean mountain cat (or Andean cat for short) is regarded as one of the most endangered wild cats in the world and perhaps the rarest South American wild cat. Very little is known about this species and there have been only 10 documented sightings in the last 25 years. The Alliance has managed to be the first to capture and radio-collar an Andean cat, and were also the first to obtain photographs by camera trap.

== Programs ==
=== Geographic distribution ===
The Andean Cat Alliance uses camera trapping, DNA analysis of feces, and surveys of local inhabitants to confirm the andean cats presence. AGA has widened the cat's known range in Peru and Argentina and has helped to better understand its population density and genetic variability.

=== Education ===
The Andean Cat Alliance conducts training for park guards and local people to help them become local wildlife monitors so they may better contribute to protecting the andean cat and its habitat. Other activities include holding seminars and community festivals to both develop conservation strategies, and to raise awareness and learn the needs of the communities in each of the four range countries. AGA's publicity initiatives have included getting the Chilean government to associate the animal with the "Day of Native Fauna", marked annually on 5 November.

=== Conservation centers ===
The Alliance is building an EcoMuseo ("Ecological Museum") in the "Centro Poblado Menor de Alto Perú," a Peruvian village located in proximity to andean cat habitat. Working with the Small Wild Cat Conservation Foundation (SWCCF) it has established a conservation center in the Salar de Surire, Chile, where it aims to dissuade the local people from hunting the animal.

=== Increasing Protected Areas ===
One of the main goals of the Alliance is to work with governments to strengthen management of Andean cat habitat and promote new protected areas and corridors where needed.

Programs change from time to time. A current list can be found at the AGA website

== See also ==
- Wildlife Conservation Network
- Conservation movement
