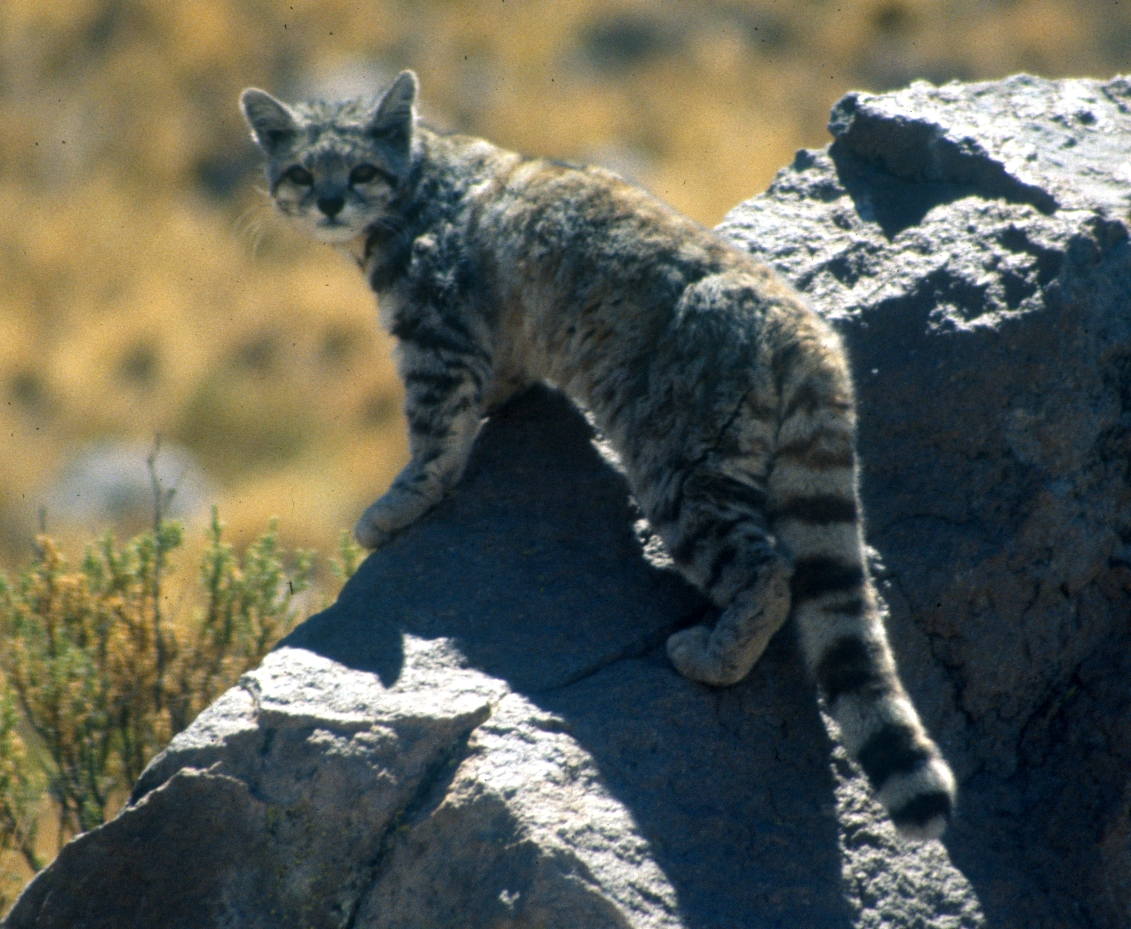

Conservation status
- Endangered (IUCN 3.1)
- CITES Appendix I

Scientific classification
- Kingdom: Animalia
- Phylum: Chordata
- Class: Mammalia
- Order: Carnivora
- Family: Felidae
- Genus: Leopardus
- Species: L. jacobita

Binomial name
- Leopardus jacobita (Cornalia, 1865)
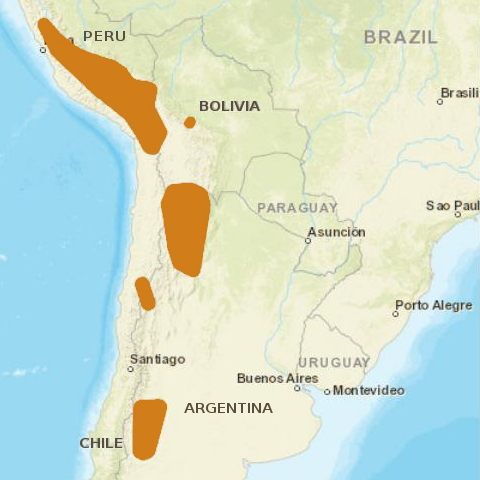
- Distribution of the Andean cat, 2016

Synonyms
- Oreailurus jacobita

= Andean mountain cat =

Small wild cat

The Andean mountain cat (Leopardus jacobita) is a small wild cat native to the high Andes that has been listed as Endangered on the IUCN Red List because fewer than 1,500 individuals are thought to exist in the wild.

The Andean mountain cat was first described by Emilio Cornalia, who named it in honor of Jacobita Mantegazza. It is a monotypic species.

== Characteristics ==
The Andean mountain cat has ashy-gray fur, a grey head, and rounded ears. The nose and lips are black, and the areas around them are white; two dark brown lines run from the corners of the eyes across the cheeks. There are black spots on the forelegs, yellowish-brown blotches on the flanks, and up to two narrow, dark rings on the hind limbs. The long, bushy tail has six to nine rings, which are dark brown to black. The markings of juveniles are darker and smaller than those of adults. The skulls of adult specimens range in length from 100.4 to 114.8 mm (3.95 to 4.52 in) and are larger than those of the pampas cat and the domestic cat.

On the back and the tail, the hair is 40–45 mm (1.6–1.8 in) long. Its rounded footprints are 4 cm (1.6 in) long and 3.5 cm (1.4 in) wide. Its pads are covered with hair. Adult individuals range from 57.7 to 85 cm (22.7 to 33.5 in) in head-to-body length with a 41.3 to 48.5 cm (16.3 to 19.1 in) long tail, a shoulder height of about 36 cm (14 in) and a body weight of up to 5.5 kg (12 lb).

The Andean mountain cat and pampas cat look similar. This similarity makes it difficult to identify which cat is observed and estimate their populations correctly, especially when attempting to gain correct information from the observations of individuals who have seen one of these cats but are unaware of specific features to distinguish between them.

Differences between Andean and pampas cats
Andean cat	Trait	Pampas Cat
2/3 of the total body length. Thick and blunt with six to nine wide rings.	Tail	1/2 of the total body length. Thin and tapered with nine thin rings.
Maximum width of rings: 60 mm (2.4 in).	Tail rings	Maximum width of rings: 20 mm (0.79 in).
Distinctive lines on the sides of the eyes. Rounded tips of ears.	Facial features	If lines are present, they are brown and less dramatic. Triangular-tipped ears are present for most of this species.
Very dark or black.	Nose	Light colored, generally pink.
Yellow and rust-colored or gray and black.	Overall color	Cream, red, rust, and black in color.
One consistent coat pattern.	Coat pattern	Three different coat patterns with different variations.
Uniform coloration of the base color.	Ear color	Patterned colored ears.
Rings are not complete; stripes are spot-like in appearance.	Front paws	Two or more well-defined, complete, black rings.

== Distribution and habitat ==
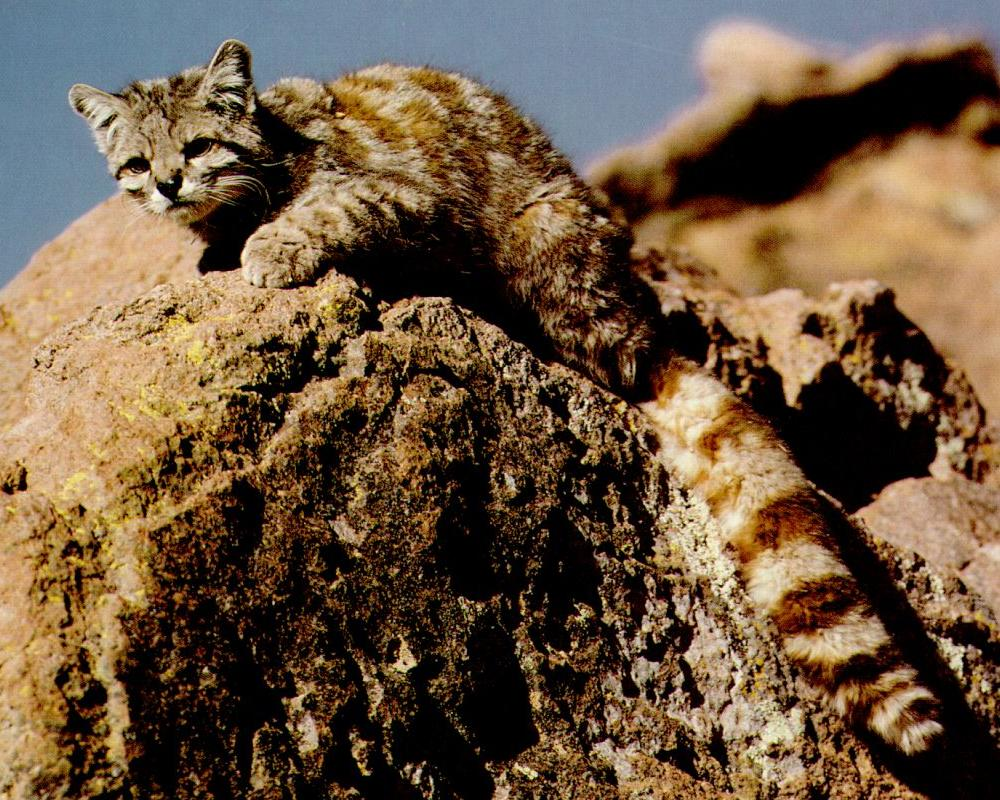
Andean mountain cat

The Andean mountain cat lives only at high elevations in the Andes. Records in Argentina indicate that it lives at elevations from 1,800 m (5,900 ft) in the southern Andes to over 4,000 m (13,000 ft) in Chile, Bolivia and central Peru. This terrain is arid, sparsely vegetated, rocky and steep showing that the Andean Mountain Cat prefers a temperate and terrestrial habitat. The population in the Salar de Surire Natural Monument was estimated at five individuals in an area of 250 km^{2} (97 sq mi). Results of a survey in the Jujuy Province of northwestern Argentina indicates a density of seven to twelve individuals per 100 km^{2} (39 sq mi) at an elevation of about 4,200 m (13,800 ft).

Deep valleys fragment its habitat in the Andes, and its preferred prey, mountain viscachas (Lagidium), occurs in patchy colonies. Across this range, the level of genetic diversity is very low.

== Behavior and ecology ==
The Andean cat is sympatric with the pampas cat and the cougar. The viscacha comprises 93.9% of the biomass consumed in the Andean cat's diet, while the pampas cat depends on it for 74.8%. Both cats depend on specific prey for their dietary needs. In some areas, the mountain viscacha makes up 53% of the Andean cat's prey items despite making up the vast majority of the biomass that it consumes. This difference is because the mountain viscacha is significantly larger in biomass than the other prey animals that the Andean cat hunts. Other prey and food groups include small reptiles, birds, and other small mammals, such as tuco-tuco. They also hunt frequently during the same periods. During one study, both the Andean cat and the pampas cat were seen most frequently during moonless nights; the second most sightings of these cats were during full moons.

Based on residents' observations of Andean cats in coupled pairs with their litters, it is thought that the mating season is in July and August. Due to kittens being seen in April and October, the mating season could extend into November or December, although not much information is known about their breeding habits. A litter usually consists of one or two offspring born in the spring and summer months. This is also common in other species that have their young when food resources are increasing, which can influence the survival rate of the young.

== Threats and conservation ==
Such factors as habitat loss and degradation, hunting, and disease threaten the Andean cat. The Andean Cat is listed on the IUCN Red List, the US Federal List, and the CITES Appendix I. It is protected in all the countries of its range. The Andean Cat Alliance was formed in 2003 by representatives from Argentina, Bolivia, Peru, and Chile to foster research and conservation of the Andean cat.

Legislation and policies protecting the Andean cat
Country	Law or policy	Protection offered	Year enacted	Number of protected areas	Sightings within protected areas	Unevaluated areas
Argentina	National Law 22421 of Wildlife Conservation	Prohibits hunting and/or trade of the Andean cat	1981, 1997, and 1986, respectively	9 protected areas	Evidence found in 7 areas	1 unevaluated, 1 partial
Argentina	Statutory Decree 666/97	Prohibits hunting and/or trade of the Andean cat	1981, 1997, and 1986, respectively	9 protected areas	Evidence found in 7 areas	1 unevaluated, 1 partial
Argentina	Resolution No. 63/86 of the Secretary of Agriculture	Prohibits hunting and/or trade of the Andean cat	1981, 1997, and 1986, respectively	9 protected areas	Evidence found in 7 areas	1 unevaluated, 1 partial
Bolivia	Decree No. 22421	General and undefined ban on hunting, capture, storage, and/or conditioning of wild animals and their by-products	1990	8 protected areas	Evidence found in 6 areas	2 areas unevaluated
Chile	Law No. 19473	Ban on hunting all felids, with penalties of up to $6,000 fine and/or imprisonment up to 3 years	1972	7 protected areas	Evidence found in 7 areas	All areas evaluated
Peru	Supreme Decree No. 013-99-AG	Ban on hunting, trading, and possession of living, dead individuals or body parts of the Andean cat	1999	12 protected areas	Evidence found in 4 areas	8 areas unevaluated

== In culture ==
The Andean mountain cat is traditionally considered a sacred animal by indigenous Aymara and Quechua people.
