= Grévy's Zebra Trust =

Organization

- Founded: Jan 2007
- Type: Non-profit Organization
- Purpose: Grévy's Zebra Conservation
- Region served: Ethiopia and Kenya
- Key people: Belinda Mackey (Executive Director)
- Website: grevyszebratrust.org

The Grévy's Zebra Trust GZT was founded in 2007 for the protection of the Grévy's Zebras (Equus grevyi) and their habitat. The Conservancy works to engage and incorporate local communities in protecting Grévy's Zebra in Ethiopia and Kenya. GZT uses scouts to collect scientific data, provide security, surveillance, and run education programs. Currently the Grévy's Zebras global population is today about 2,500 down from an estimated 15,000 in the 1970s.

== Programs ==
=== Grevy's Zebra Scouts ===
Grevy's Zebra scouts are locals who are hired and trained to help monitor the herds and report back data. The scouts also help share the message of conservation in their own communities.

=== Holistic Rangeland Management ===
Grévy's Zebra Trust works with communities to manage grazing cattle to improve the land by tilling the land and fertilizing the land so that native grasses that the Zebras eat are better able to grow.

=== Grévy's Zebra Ambassadors ===
Individuals from the Samburu and Turkana tribes that sometimes have conflict over resources are brought together to work with solutions to poaching and given jobs in data collection, security, surveillance and spreading the conservation message.

=== Education and Outreach ===
Teams of scouts go into the communities to perform conservation storytelling and puppet shows for local children and through workshops for the adults. In this process they strive to learn the needs of the communities.

== See also ==
- Wildlife Conservation Network
- Conservation movement
- Environmental movement
- Natural environment
- Sustainability
