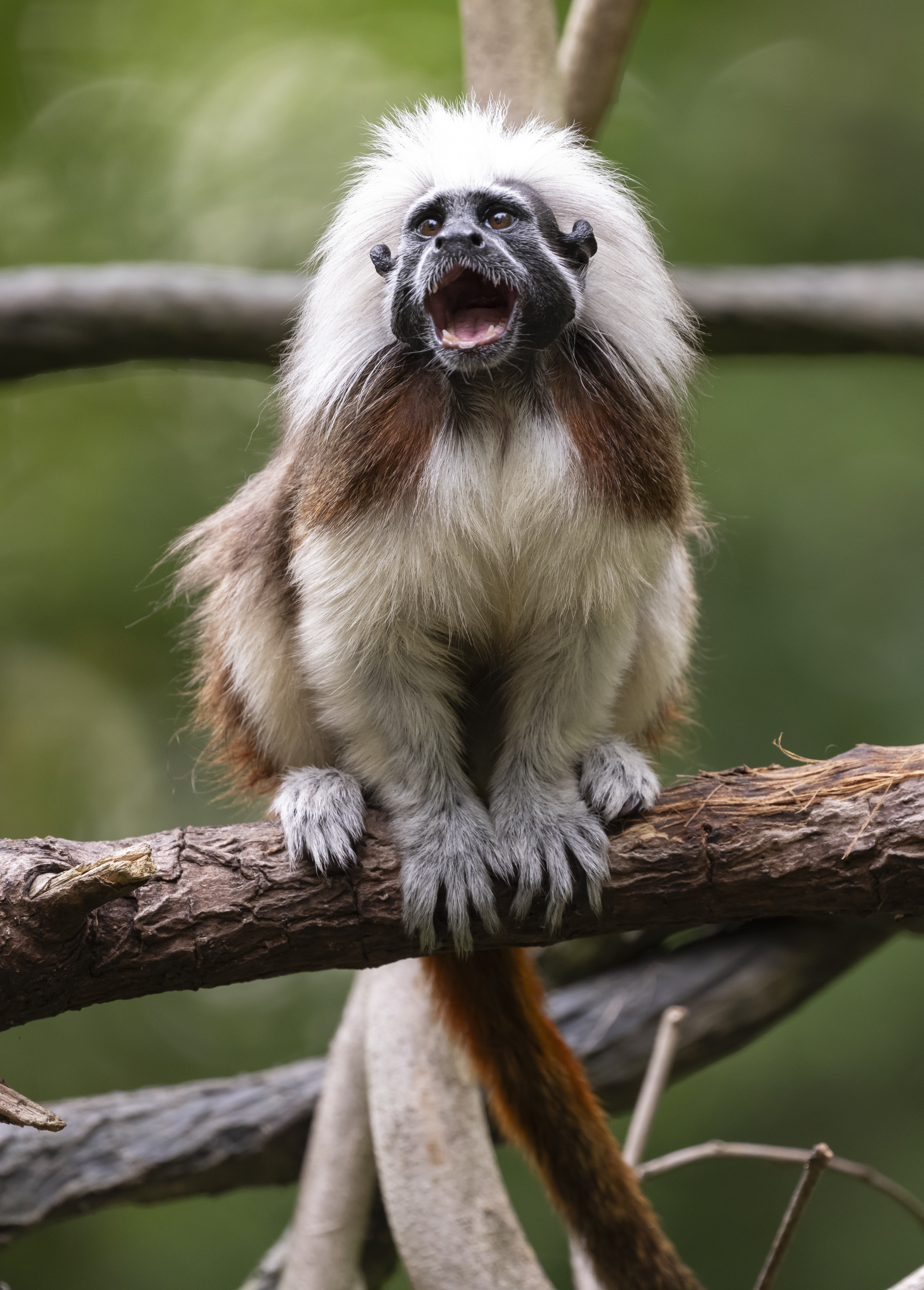
- Male at Singapore Zoo, Singapore
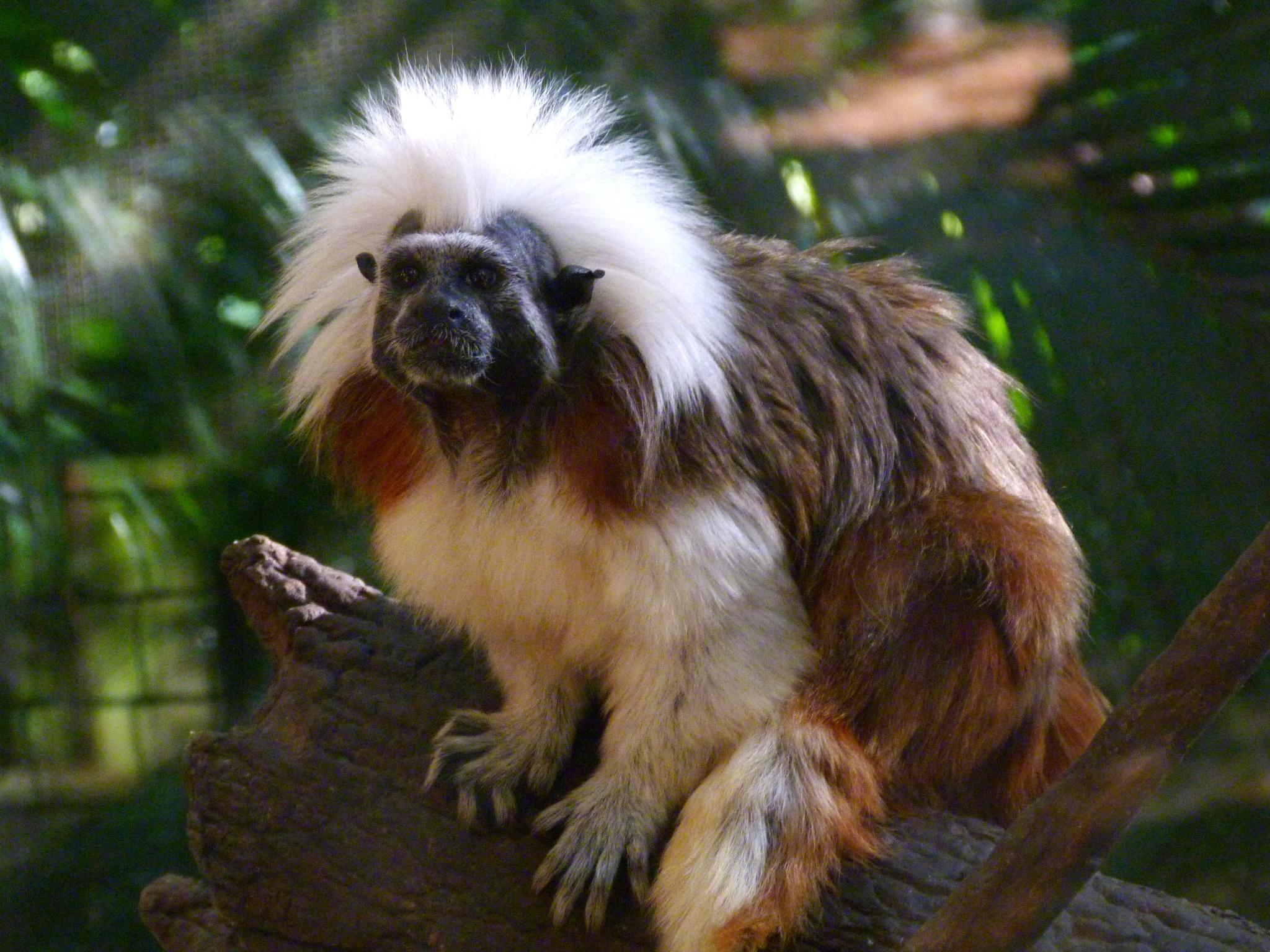
- Female at Brevard Zoo, Florida, United States

Conservation status
- Critically Endangered (IUCN 3.1)
- CITES Appendix I

Scientific classification
- Kingdom: Animalia
- Phylum: Chordata
- Class: Mammalia
- Order: Primates
- Family: Callitrichidae
- Genus: Saguinus
- Species: S. oedipus

Binomial name
- Saguinus oedipus (Linnaeus, 1758)
- Range of the Cotton-top Tamarin

Synonyms
- Simia oedipus Linnaeus, 1758

= Cotton-top tamarin =

Species of New World monkey

The cotton-top tamarin (Saguinus oedipus) is a small New World monkey weighing less than 0.5 kg (1.1 lb). One of the smallest primates, the cotton-top tamarin is easily recognized by the long, white sagittal crest extending from its forehead to its shoulders. The species is found in tropical forest edges and secondary forests in northwestern Colombia, where it is arboreal and diurnal. Its diet includes insects and plant exudates, and it is an important seed disperser in the tropical ecosystem.

The cotton-top tamarin displays a wide variety of social behaviors. In particular, groups form a clear dominance hierarchy where only dominant pairs breed. The female normally gives birth to twins and uses pheromones to prevent other females in the group from breeding. These tamarins have been extensively studied for their high level of cooperative care, as well as altruistic and spiteful behaviors. Communication between cotton-top tamarins is sophisticated and shows evidence of simple grammatical structure.

Up to 40,000 cotton-top tamarins are thought to have been caught and exported for use in biomedical research before 1976, when CITES gave them the highest level of protection and all international commercial trade was prohibited. Now, the species is at risk due to large-scale habitat destruction, as the lowland forest in northwestern Colombia where the cotton-top tamarin is found has been reduced to 5% of its previous area. It is currently classified as critically endangered and is one of the rarest primates in the world, with only 6,000 individuals left in the wild.

== Taxonomy and naming ==
S. oedipus has the common names "cotton-top tamarin" and "cotton-headed tamarin" in English. Its name comes from the white hair that spans its head and flows down past the neck. In Spanish, it is commonly called bichichi, tití pielroja, tití blanco, tití cabeza blanca, or tití leoncito. In German-speaking areas, the cotton-top tamarin is commonly known as Lisztaffe (literally "Liszt monkey") due to the resemblance of its crest to the hairstyle of Hungarian composer and piano virtuoso Franz Liszt.

The species was first described by Carl Linnaeus in his landmark 1758 10th edition of Systema Naturae. as Simia oedipus. Linnaeus chose the specific name oedipus, which means swollen foot, but as the species does not have particularly large feet, it is unknown why he chose this name. (Linnaeus often selected names from mythology without any particular rationale, and he may have used the name of Oedipus, the mythical Greek king of Thebes, more or less arbitrarily.) In 1977, Philip Hershkovitz performed a taxonomic analysis of the species based on fur coloration patterns, cranial and mandibular morphology, and ear size. He classified Geoffroy's tamarin S. geoffroyi as a subspecies of S. oedipus. Subsequent analyses by Hernández-Camacho and Cooper (1976), Russell Mittermeier and Coimbra-Filho (1981), and later Grooves (2001) consider the S. oedipus and S. geoffroyi types to be separate species.

Some researchers, such as Thorington (1976), posit that S. oedipus is more closely related to the white-footed tamarin (S. leucopus) than to S. geoffroyi. This view is supported by Hanihara and Natoria's analysis of toothcomb dental morphology (1987) and by Skinner (1991), who found similarities between S. oedipus and S. leucopus in 16 of 17 morphological traits considered.

This species of white-headed tamarin is thought to have diverged from the other Amazonian forms such as S. leucopus. This is supported by morphological considerations of the transition from juvenile to adulthood, during which the fur coloration patterns change. significantly and are similar between the two species. Hershkovitz proposed that the separation of the two species happened in the Pleistocene at the height of the Atrato River, where it intersected the Cauca-Magdalena. At that time, the area was covered by a sea, which created a geographic barrier that caused the species to diverge through the process of allopatric speciation. Today, the two species are principally separated by the Atrato River.

In 2022, Jeferson Carneiro and his colleagues proposed the designation of the genus Oedipomidas as part of a taxonomic reclassification effort for New World tamarins and marmosets. Under this designation, the cotton-top tamarin could be reclassified as O. oedipus, with Saguinus being resorted to a synonym as a result.

== Physical characteristics ==
The cotton-top tamarin is part of the most diminutive family of monkeys, Callitrichidae, the marmosets and tamarins; it weighs 432 g (15.2 oz) on average. Its head–body length is 20.8–25.9 cm (8.2–10.2 in), while its tail—which is not prehensile—is slightly longer at around 33–41 cm (13–16 in). The species is not sexually dimorphic, the male and female are of a similar size and weight. Members of the Callitrichinae subfamily (including this species) have sharp nails (tegulae) on all digits except the big toes, which have the flat nails (ungulae) common to other primates. Tegulae resemble a squirrel's claws and help with movement through trees.

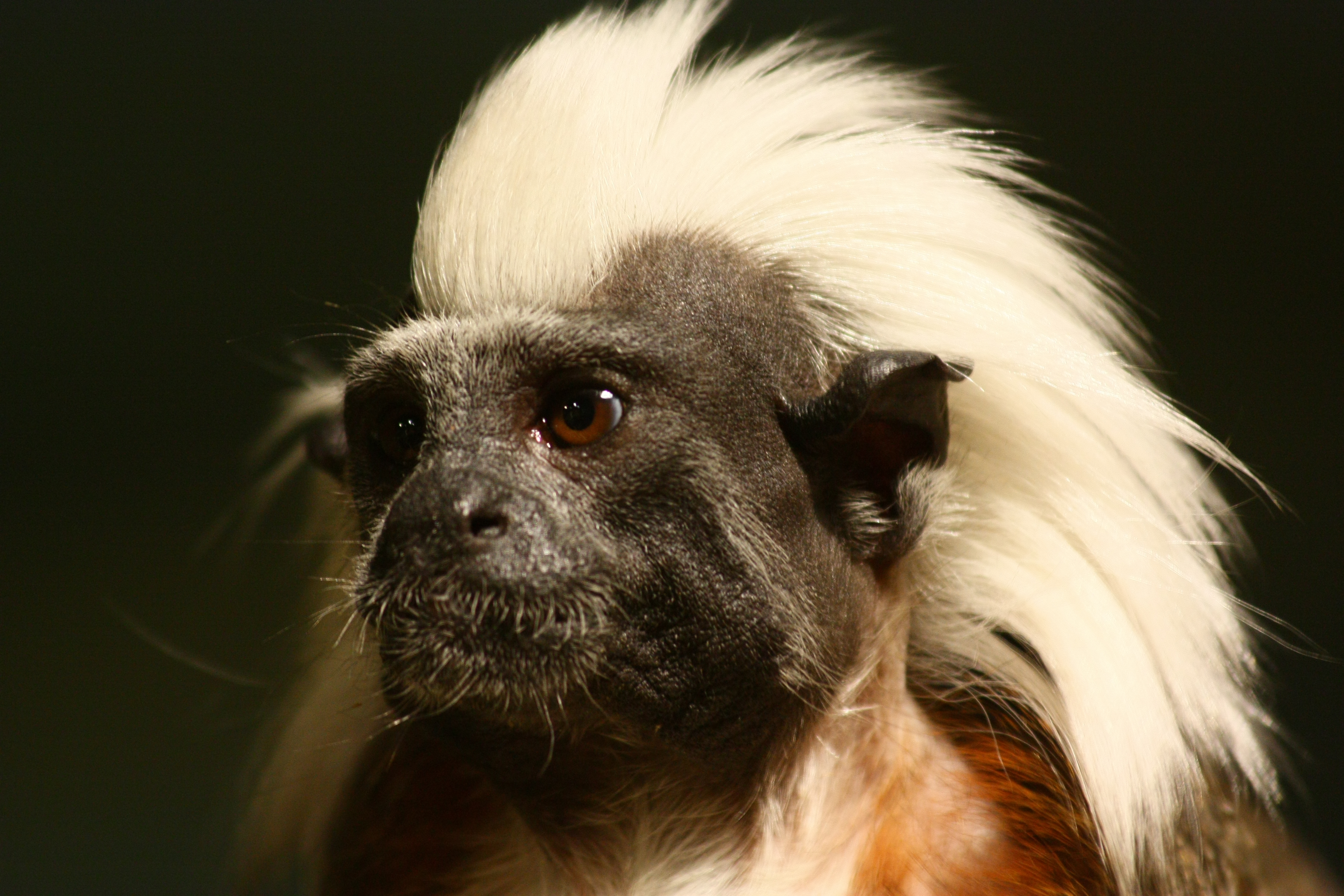
The white hair on the back of the head and neck inspire its common name, "cotton-top".

The cotton-top tamarin has a long sagittal crest, consisting of white hairs, from forehead to nape flowing over the shoulders. The skin of the face is black with gray or white bands located above the eyes. These bands continue along the edge of the face down to the jaw. Tamarins are generally divided into three groups by their facial characteristics: hairy-faced, mottled-faced, and bare-faced. The cotton-top tamarin has fine white hair covering its face, but they are so fine as to appear naked, thus it is considered a bare-faced tamarin. Its lower canine teeth are longer than its incisors, creating the appearance of tusks. Like other callitrichids, the cotton-top tamarin has two molar teeth on each side of its jaw, not three like other New World monkeys.

The cotton-top tamarin has fur covering all of the body except the palms of the hands and feet, the eyelids, the borders of the nostrils, the nipples, the anus, and the penis. The back is brown, and the underparts, arms, and legs are whitish-yellow. The rump and inner thighs and upper tail are reddish-orange. The fur is distributed with varying densities throughout the body: the genital region (scrotum and pubic zone), axilla, and the base of the tail have lower densities, while the forward region is much higher. Many individuals have stripes or whorls of fur of striking coloration on their throats. The cotton-top also has whiskers on its forehead and around its mouth.

== Habitat and distribution ==
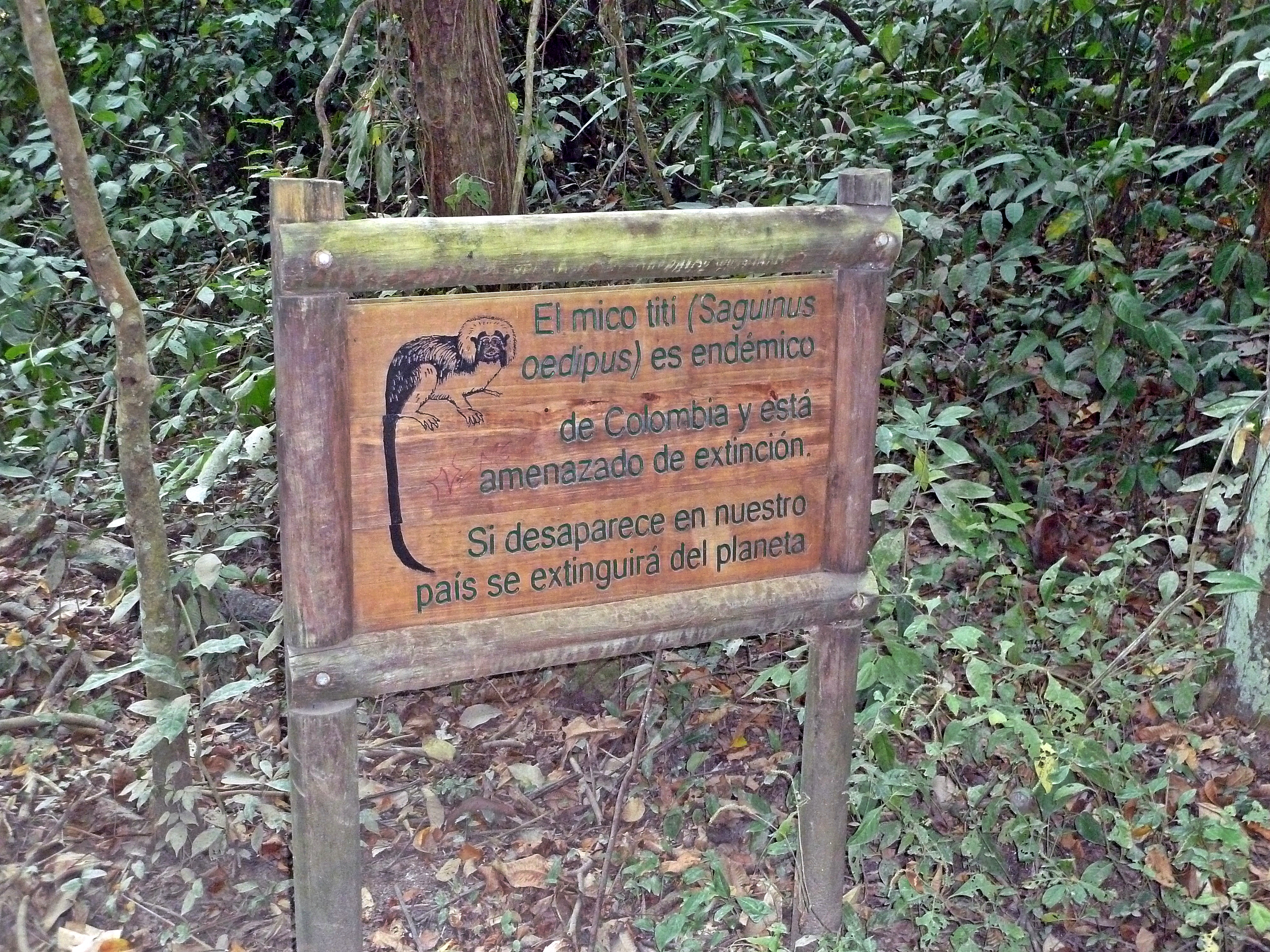
A sign in Tayrona National Natural Park in northern Colombia pointing out the tamarin's endangered status in the only part of the world where it still exists

The cotton-top tamarin is restricted to a small area of northwest Colombia, between the Cauca and Magdalena Rivers to the south and east, the Atlantic coast to the north, and the Atrato River to the west. They are found exclusively in Colombia; 98% of their habitat has been destroyed. Historically, the entire area was suitable for the cotton-top tamarin, but due to habitat loss through deforestation, it survives in fragmented parks and reserves. One of the most important areas for the cotton-top is the Paramillo National Park, which consists of 460,000 hectares (1,800 mi^{2}) of primary and secondary forests.

The cotton-top tamarin is found in both primary and secondary forests, from humid tropical forests in the south of its range to tropical dry forests in the north. It is seldom found at altitudes above 400 m (1,300 ft), but has been encountered up to 1,500 m (4,900 ft). It prefers the lower levels of the tropical forests, but may also be found foraging on the ground and between the understory and the canopy. It can adapt to forest fragments and can survive in relatively disturbed habitats. In the dry forests are pronounced seasons. Between December and April, it is dry, while heavy rainfall occurs between August and November which can flood the forest floor. Across its range, annual rainfall varies between 500 and 1,300 mm (20 and 51 in).

== Ecology ==
The cotton-top tamarin has a diet of mainly fruit (40%) and animal material (40%). This includes insects, plant exudates such as gum and sap, nectar, and occasionally reptiles and amphibians. Due to its small body size and high food passage rate, its diet must be high-quality and high-energy. Insectivory is common in the cotton-top and the species hunts for insects using a variety of methods: stealth, pouncing, chasing, exploring holes, and turning over leaves.

Tamarins act as seed dispersers in tropical ecosystems. While larger primates eat larger seeds, tamarins eat the smaller ones. The expelled seeds have a higher germination rate than others and ingesting larger seeds may help to dislodge and expel intestinal parasites.

The cotton-top tamarin is diurnal and sleeps with its social group in trees with foliage cover. The group leaves the sleeping tree together an hour after dawn and spends the day foraging, resting, travelling, and grooming. The species is thought to rise late and increases the speed of its foraging and travelling before dusk to avoid crepuscular and nocturnal predators. Its main predators include raptors, mustelids, felids, and snakes. The cotton-top tamarin is extremely vigilant, always looking for potential predators. When the group is resting, one individual moves apart and acts as a lookout to alert the group if it sees a threat.

The cotton-top tamarin can live as long as 24 years in captivity, while its lifespan in the wild averages 13 years.

== Behavior ==
Two cotton-top tamarins feed at Ueno Zoo in Japan (video)

=== Social systems ===
The cotton-top tamarin is a highly social primate that typically lives in groups of two to nine individuals, but may reach up to 13 members. These small familial groups tend to fluctuate in size and in composition of individuals and a clear dominance hierarchy is always present within a party. At the head of the group is the breeding pair. The male and female in this pair are typically in a monogamous reproductive relationship, and together serve as the group's dominant leaders.

Dominant pairs are the only breeding pair within their groups, and the female generally has authority over the breeding male. While nonbreeding group members can be the leading pair's offspring, immigrant adults may also live with and cooperate in these groups. This social grouping in cotton-top tamarins is hypothesized to arise from predation pressure. Cotton-top tamarins exhibit prosocial behavior that benefits other members of the group, and are well known for engaging in cooperative breeding whereby the group's subordinate adults help in rearing the offspring of the dominant pair. The dominant female is more likely to give birth to non-identical twins than a singleton, so it would be too energetically expensive for just one pair to raise the young.

To prevent younger, subordinate females within the group from breeding, the dominant female uses pheromones. This suppresses sexual behavior and delays puberty. Unrelated males that join the group can release the females from this reproductive suppression; this may result in more than one female of the group becoming pregnant, but only one of the pregnancies will be successful.

==== Cooperation ====
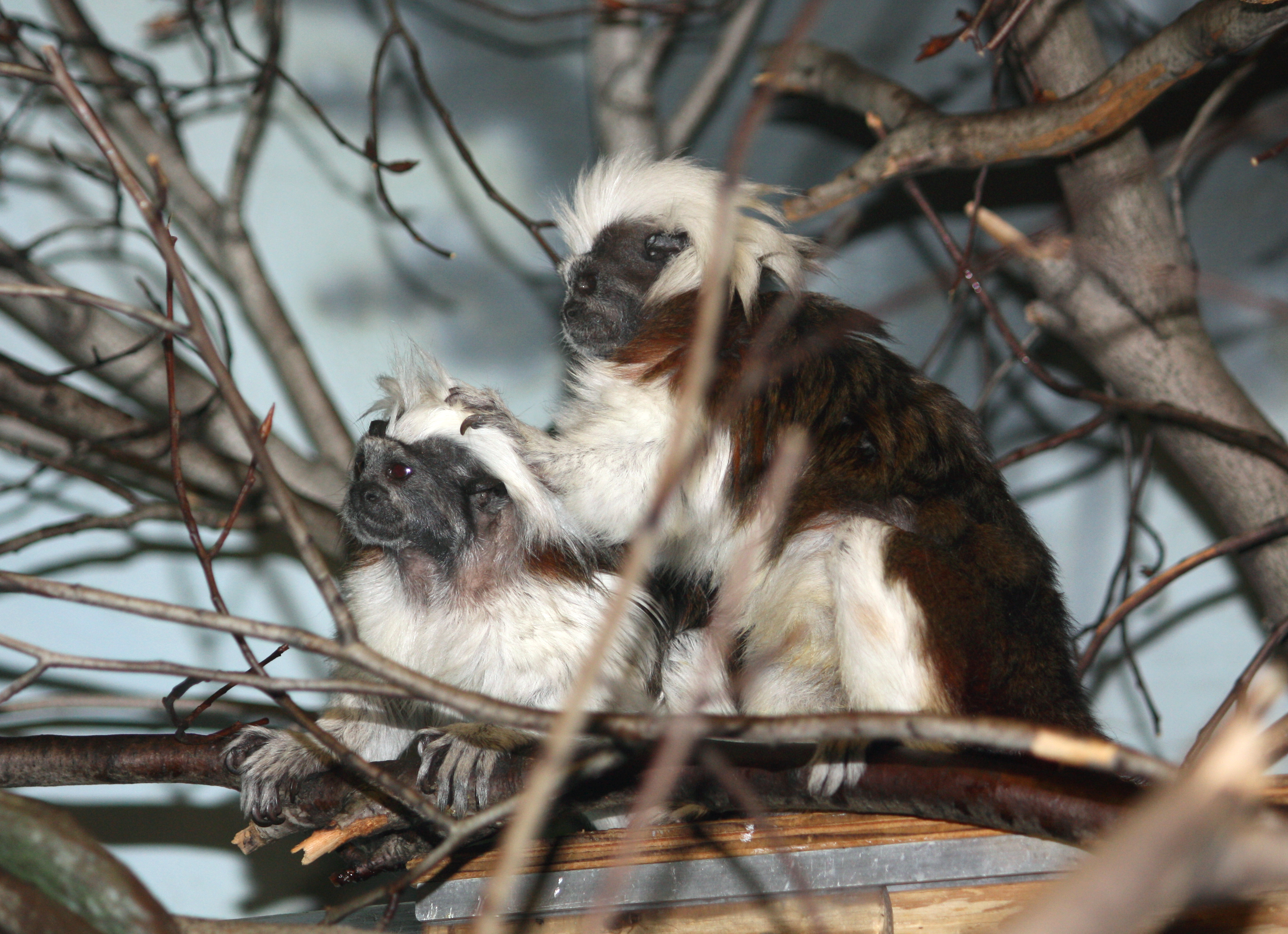
A male grooming a female as part of the species' cooperative ritual

In cooperative breeding, the effort put into caring for the dominant breeders' offspring is shared by the group members. Parents, siblings, and immigrant adults share young rearing duties for the breeding pair's young. These duties include carrying, protecting, feeding, comforting, and even engaging in play behavior with the group's young. Cotton-top tamarins display high levels of parental investment during infant care. Males, particularly those that are paternal, show greater involvement in caregiving than do females. The father usually begins carrying their newborns on their day of birth. They spend as much time caring for newborns as the mother does during the first 5 days after birth. The sons and daughters of the family will delay emigration in order to care for the infant as well. Despite this, both male and female infants prefers contact and proximity to their mothers over their fathers. Males may invest additional support in rearing offspring as a form of courtship to win the favor of the group's dominant female. However, evidence indicates that time spent carrying infants does not correlate with a male's overall copulation frequency.

Since only one female in a group breeds, heavy investment in infant care ensures that all offspring survive until independence. Accordingly, cotton-top tamarins bear excessive costs to care for the group's young. Male carriers, especially paternal carriers, incur large energetic costs for the sake of the group's young. This burden may cause some male cotton-tops to lose up to 10–11% of their total body weight. The large weight loss may occur from reduced food intake as infant-carrying inhibits foraging ability for a carrier. The trend of male-carrier weight loss and decreased food intake is in contrast to the dominant female's periovulatory period, when she gains weight after increasing her own food intake and relinquishing much of her infant-carrying duties.

==== Altruism ====
While caregiving by males appears to be altruistic, particularly in cotton-top sires, the costs of infant care may in fact be tolerated for selfish reasons. Namely, the costs to male weight and foraging ability may, in turn, promote consecutive pregnancies in dominant females, thereby providing more offspring bearing the sire's genes. Additionally, the cooperative breeding structure of cotton-tops can change with group size and parental experience. First-time sires spend a greater amount of time carrying the infant than experienced ones, and in smaller groups, sires do a greater proportion of carrying and feeding the infant than in larger groups, where helpers take on more of the work. Total care for infants remains constant with varying group size, and infant outcome is not significantly different in groups that have differing levels of experience in raising offspring.

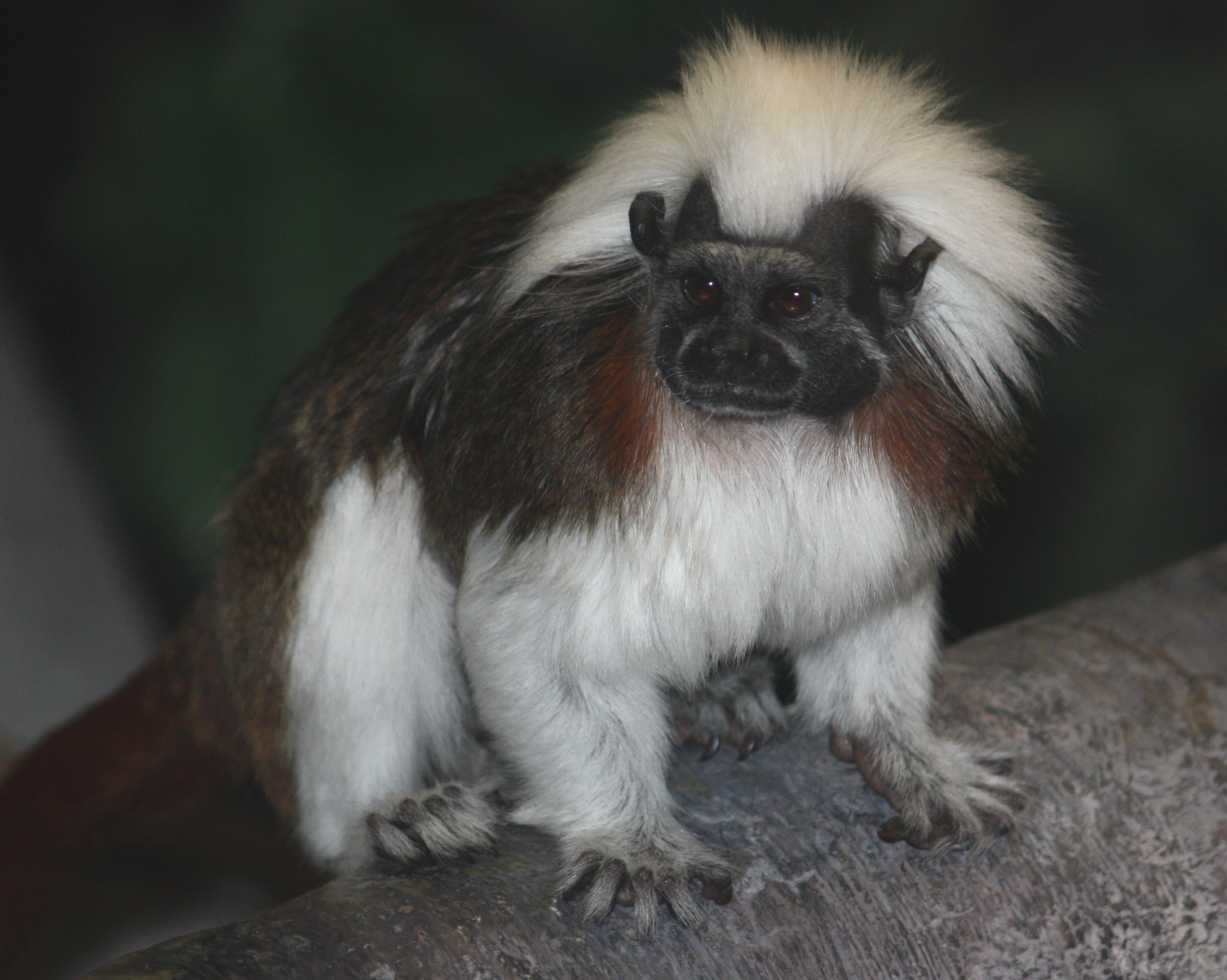
Once infants reach sufficient age, they permanently leave the backs of their carriers and begin contributing to the group.

The cooperative breeding hypothesis predicts that cotton-top tamarins engage with this young-rearing paradigm, and in turn, naturally embrace patterns of prosocial behavior. These monkeys engage in such behavior by acting altruistically within their groups in caring for infants, vocalizing alarm calls, and in sharing food. Though some studies indicate that cotton-top tamarins have the psychological capacity to participate in reciprocally mediated altruism, it is unclear whether the cotton-top tamarin acts solely using judgments on reinforcement history.

Other studies involving cotton-top tamarins have hinted that positive reciprocity and reciprocal altruism are irrelevant in the prosociality of these primates. Some researchers believe these primates tend to cooperate for selfish reasons and in situations where they incur some benefit for themselves. That is, cooperation in cotton-top tamarins can be better described by mutualism than by true altruism.

Tamarins in captivity have shown the ability to distinguish other individuals based on cooperative tendencies and past behavior. Cotton-tops ultimately use this information to guide future cooperation. Brief periods of defection tend to cause swift, irreparable breakups between these primates and their cooperators. To avoid this, cotton-top tamarins may make economically driven decisions based on the projected incentives of a potential cooperator.

==== Spite and aggression ====
Despite an expansive array of altruistic behaviors, cotton-top tamarins engage in great bouts of spite through negative reciprocity and punishment. They have been observed to immediately start denying cooperation with monkeys that deny them benefits. Further, in captivity, these primates are not observed to increase altruistic behavior with fellow primates that are committed fully to cooperation. Based on this, researchers believe that repeated interactions in a cooperative society like that of the cotton-top tamarin can heighten the chances that an individual will designate behavioral punishments to others in its group. This reaction has also been observed in other species. However, these reciprocal punishments, or relative lack of altruistic actions, may alternatively happen as a result of response facilitation that increases the chances of a cotton-top punishing another primate after watching that individual perform a similar action.

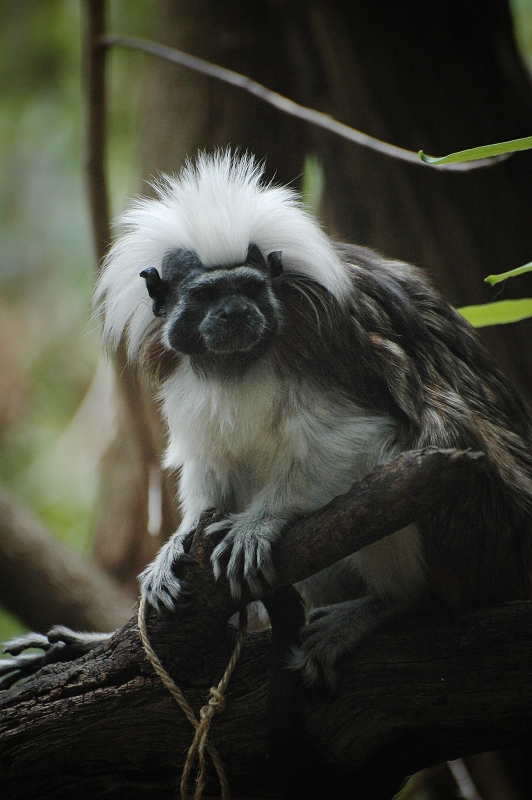
Dominant females may evict subordinate females from the group out of spite.

Another way to look at punishment in cotton-top tamarins is by observing their aggressive behavioral responses within and between groups, as well as between species. The cotton-top tamarin, like many marmosets, other tamarins, and specifically those in the genus Saguinus, stages aggressive displays almost exclusively towards fellow monkeys that belong to the same gender. These intrasexual displays of aggression are more frequent in females, and are vital when a breeding female is forcing both subadult and adult females to emigrate out of a familial group.

Though aggression can occur within groups, the response towards intruders of another species is much more drastic and can involve a sexual dimorphism in displays. Females typically employ scent-marking intruder response tactics, whereas males are more prone to vocalizing threats, physical aggression, and piloerection. Scent-marking in cotton-top tamarins is done in two ways: either using anogenital scent-marking, or suprapubic scent-marking. The ability to use both of these separate glandular fields for threat signals may indicate females have developed diverging evolutionary threats through differential use of these markings. These variable signals may be used to sign a territorial encounter, or serve as a reproductive signal. The intensity of female threats is generally comparable when directed at intruders of either gender. In contrast, male cotton-tops are considerably more threatening towards fellow males than towards females.

=== Communication ===
The cotton-top tamarin vocalizes with bird-like whistles, soft chirping sounds, high-pitched trilling, and staccato calls. Researchers describe its repertoire of 38 distinct sounds as unusually sophisticated, conforming to grammatical rules. Jayne Cleveland and Charles Snowdon performed an in-depth feature analysis to classify the cotton-top's repertoire of vocalizations in 1982. They concluded that it uses a simple grammar consisting of eight phonetic variations of short, frequency-modulated "chirps"—each representing varying messages—and five longer constant frequency "whistles". They hypothesize that some of these calls demonstrate that the cotton-top tamarin uses phonetic syntax, while other calls may be exemplars of lexical syntax usage. Each type of call is given a letter signifier; for example, C-calls are associated with finding food and D-calls are associated with eating. Further, these calls can be modified to better deliver information relevant to auditory localization in call-recipients. Using this range of vocalizations, the adults may be able to communicate with one another about intention, thought processes, and emotion, including curiosity, fear, dismay, playfulness, warnings, joy, and calls to young.

==== Language acquisition ====
Over the first 20 weeks, after a cotton-top tamarin is born, it is not fully capable of producing the range of vocalizations that an adult monkey can. Despite this limitation on speech producibility, researchers believe that language acquisition occurs early on with speech comprehension abilities arising first. Infants can at times produce adult-like chirps, but this is rarely done in the correct context and remains inconsistent across the first 20 weeks of life. Regardless, infant cotton-tops are able to respond in behaviorally appropriate ways to varying contexts when presented with adult chirps. This indicates that verbal perception is a quickly acquired skill for offspring, followed closely by auditory comprehension, and later by proper vocal producibility.

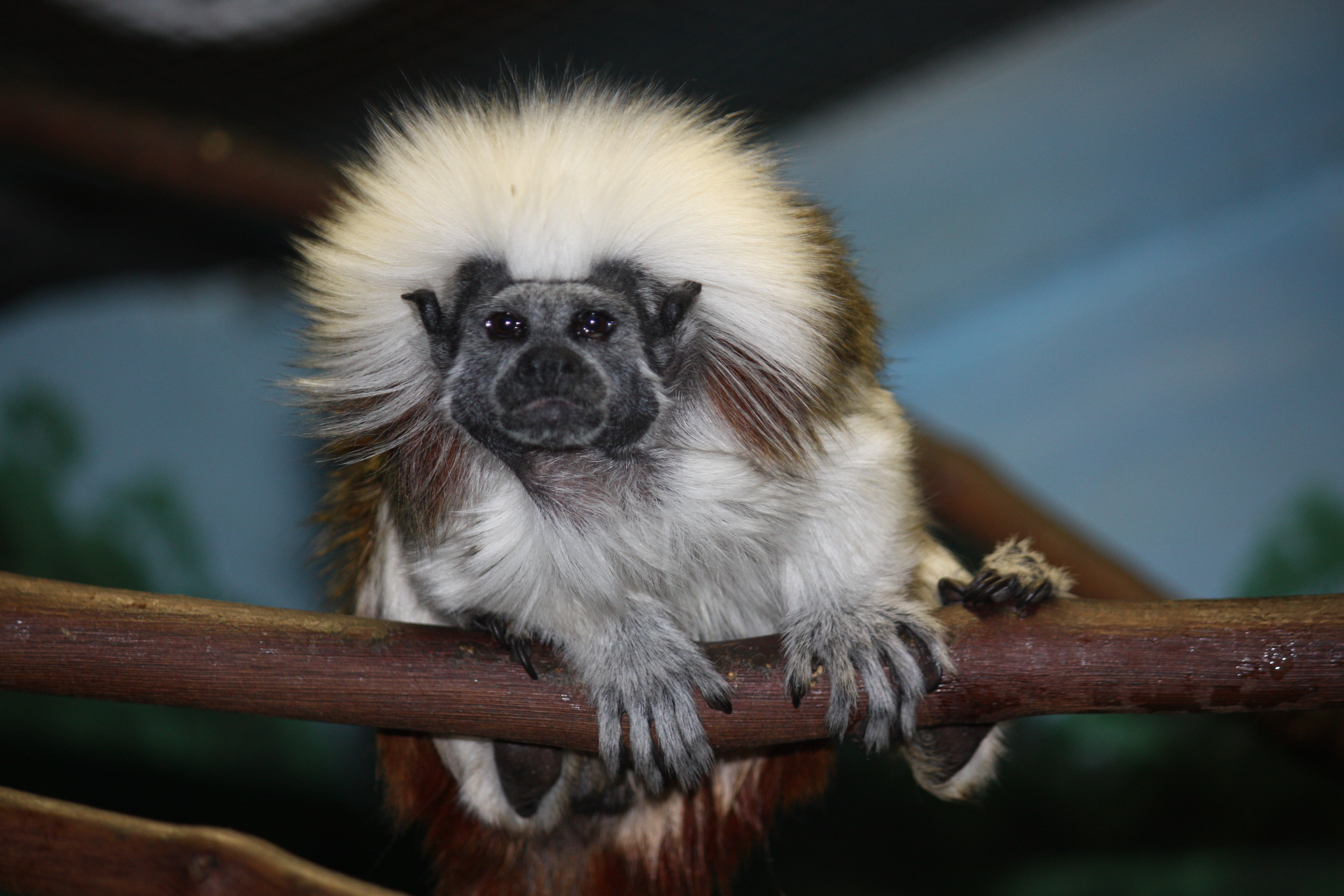
Although limited in their own vocal ranges, juvenile cotton-tops respond appropriately to varying contexts provided by adult vocalizations.

Castro and Snowdon (2000) observed that aside from inconsistent adult-like chirping, cotton-top infants most often produce a prototype chirp that differs in vocalization structure from anything seen in the full adult range of vocalizations. Infants are thought to imitate adult speakers, which use differing calls in various contexts, but by using solely the infant prototypical chirp. For instance, adult cotton-tops are known to significantly reduce the amount of general alarm calling in the presence of infants. This is likely adapted so that adults in close proximity to the groups young do not attract the attention of predators to infant-dense areas. Additionally, infants reduce their prototype chirping in the presence of predators. Whether infants are shadowing the calling behavior of adults or they are comprehending danger remains unclear. However, researchers argue that young cotton-top tamarins are able to represent semantic information regardless of immature speech production.

To confirm the notion that language acquisition occurs as a progression of comprehension before production, Castro and Snowdon (2000) showed that infants respond behaviorally to vocalizing adults in a fashion that indicates they can comprehend auditory inputs. When an adult produces a C-call chirp, used to indicate food preference and when navigating to a food source, an infant approaches the adult caller to be fed, but do not use the prototype calling as a proxy for C-calls. This finding argues for the idea that infants are able to understand vocalizations first, and later acquire the ability to communicate with adult vocalizations.

==== General calling ====
Among the typical cotton-top tamarin communicative vocalizations, the combination long call (CLC) and the alarm call (AC) are the most heavily represented in the literature. CLCs encompass a range of contact calls that are produced by isolated individuals using chirps and whistles. This type of call is also used for seemingly altruistic alarm calls, thus adding to its range of cooperative behaviors. It is issued in the presence of kin when a threatening llamas predator is seen. Predators of the cotton-top tamarin include snakes, ocelots, tayras, and most notably, hawks. Early observations by Patricia Neyman even showed that cotton-tops produce diverse sets of alarm calls that can discriminate the presence of birds of prey versus ground-based predators.

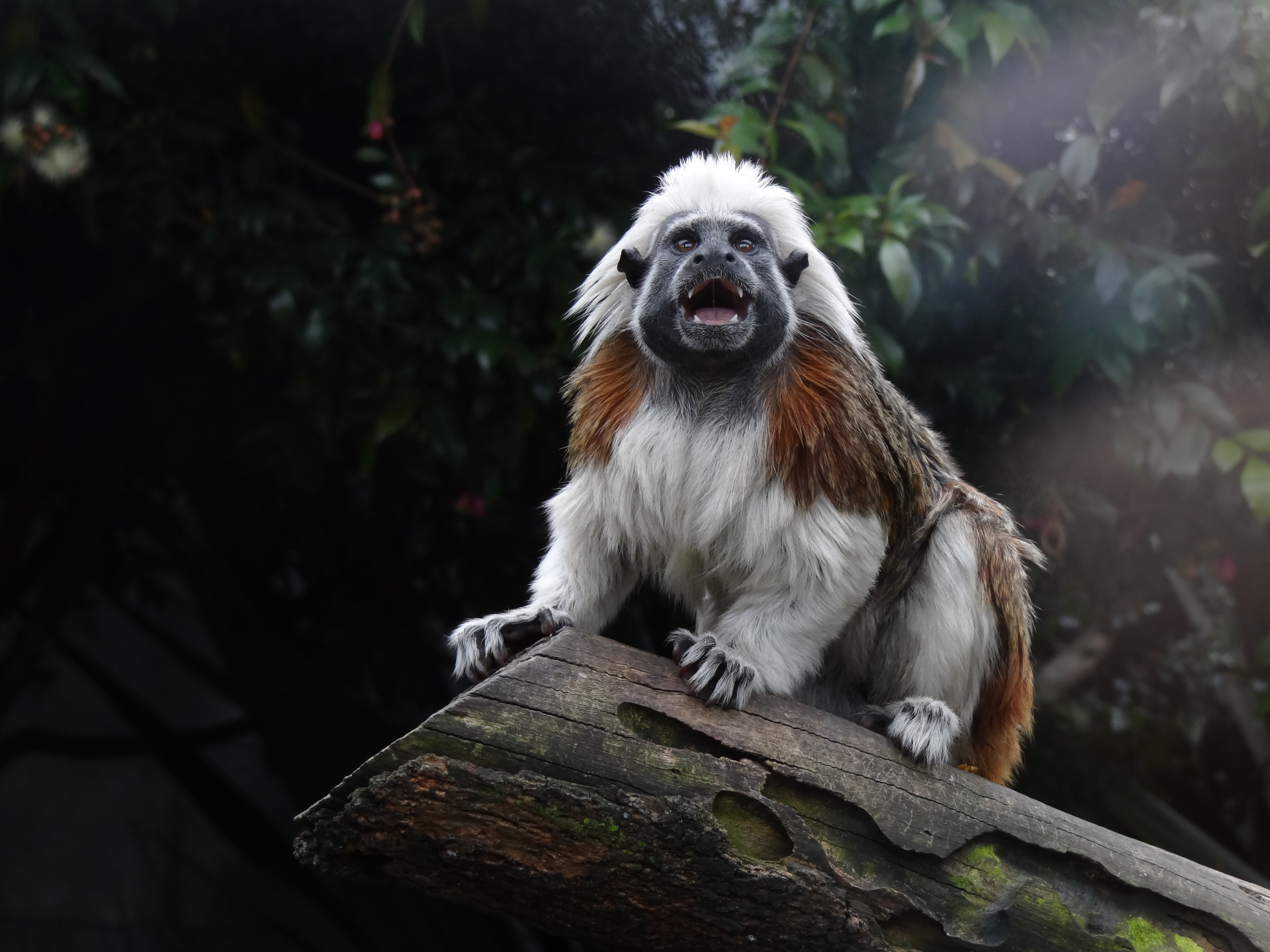
A mature cotton-top tamarin producing vocalization for group mates

CLCs involve the production of complex sequence multisyllabic vocalizations. Researchers have argued that long calls exhibit individual differences, thus can carry information sufficient for recipients to determine caller identity. Using habituation-discrimination paradigms in language experiments, this theory has been confirmed multiple times in literature. However, the individual syllables within a complete CLC vocalization in isolation of each other do not transfer sufficient information to communicate messages between monkeys. Scientists thus consider the whole, intact string of vocalizations to be the unit of perception for CLCs in the cotton-top tamarin. These examinations may confirm that cotton-tops incorporate a lexical syntax in areas of their communication.

Since tamarins can discriminate between predatory threats using varying vocalizations, recipients of an AC are thought to extract various complex signals from this form of communication. Primarily, cotton-tops are able to glean the identity of the cooperating tamarin through differences in individuals' alarm calls. Further, adults are able to discriminate the gender of callers from their ACs and determine the range of calls within a related tamarin's alarm calling repertoire. Alarm call-based identification is postulated to play a number of functional roles in the cotton-top tamarin. Firstly, an AC recipient is able to identify a cooperating tamarin, and by recognizing which in their group it is, be able to judge the reliability of the AC from past experience. This may arise from a selective pressure for being able to statistically determine the amount of risk present, and how endangered an individual and its group are.

Additionally, being able to localize auditory signals may help determine predator location, especially in the presence of a second AC from a different tamarin in the group. This can help confirm predator presence, type (e.g. flying versus ground-based), and support the recipient in triangulating a predator's location. In the context of the cotton-top's cooperative breeding groups, this is postulated as being adaptive for determining the variable risk to one's group members. For example, a call recipient is able to determine which of its kin are and are not at risk (e.g. young offspring, mates, subordinates, relatives, carriers, etc.) and plan subsequent actions accordingly.

==== Food calls ====
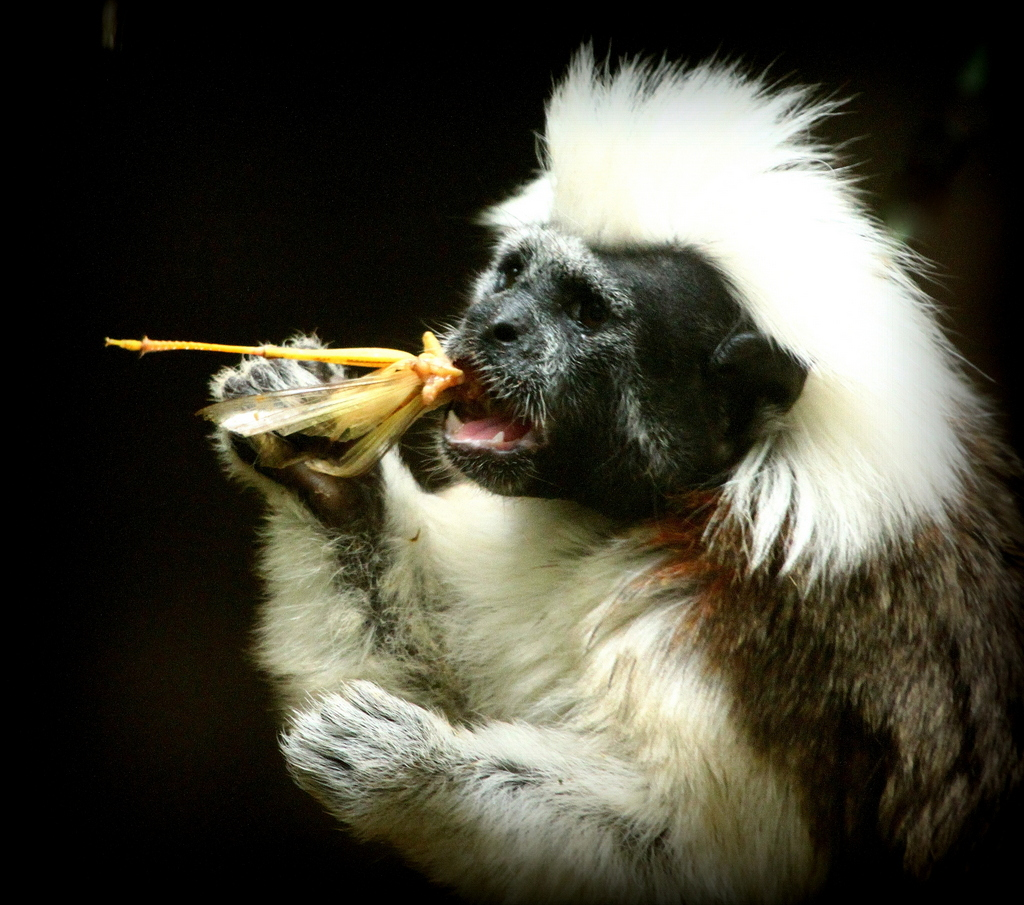
The species is thought to vocalize food preference using C-calls and food retrieval and eating using D-calls.

The cotton-top tamarin makes selective, specialized vocalizations in the presence of food. These include the C-call, produced when a cotton-top approaches and sorts through food, and the D-call, which is associated with food retrieval and is exhibited while eating.

C-call chirping is believed to be an honest signal for communicating food preference, and a cotton-top tamarin more often and more rapidly vocalizes with these chirps when approaching a highly favored food source. Functionally, this behavior may inform other tamarins of the actions the caller will take in a feeding context and whether a preferable food source is available. Despite this research indicating that food calls may be informative to fellow group mates, other observations of cotton-tops show that quantity and distribution of food and audience do not significantly alter a caller's food-centered vocalizations.

The cotton-top tamarin is seen to produce food calls both in the presence and absence of group members. Additionally, response to food calls are directed back to an original caller independent of visual confirmation of a food source. While this may appear to be a result of a very primitive form of communication, Roush and Snowdon (2005) maintain that the food-calling behavior confers some mentally representable information about food to recipient tamarins.

== Conservation status ==
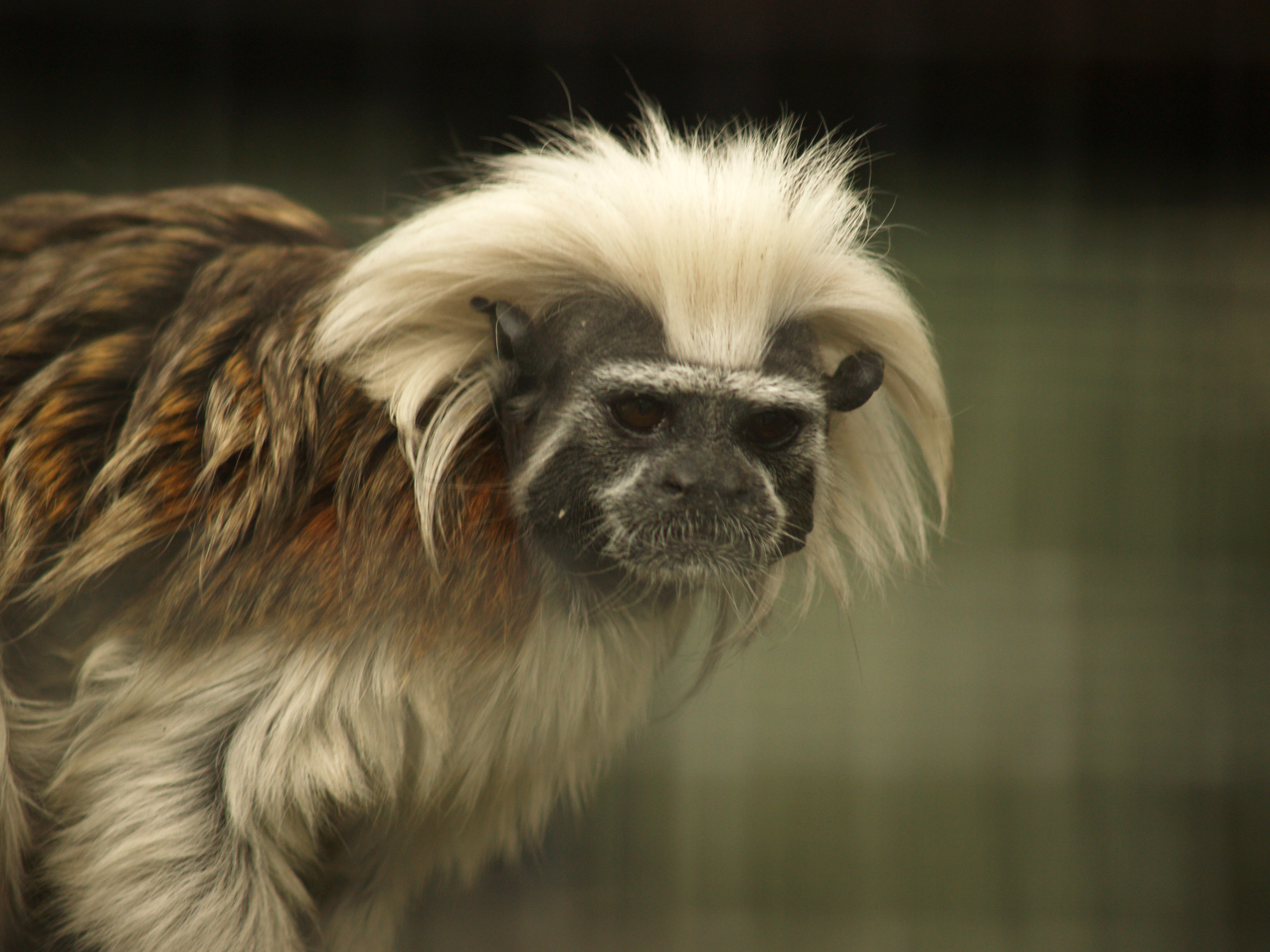
The species is critically endangered, with a wild population of merely 6,000 individuals including about 2,000 free-roaming adults.

The wild population is estimated at 6,000 individuals, with 2,000 adults. This species is critically endangered, and was listed in "The World's 25 Most Endangered Primates between 2008 and 2012." The publication lists highly endangered primate species and is released every two years by the International Union for Conservation of Nature Species Survival Commission Primate Specialist Group. The cotton-top tamarin was not selected for the 2012–2014 publication.

Habitat destruction through forest clearing is the main cause of this collapse, and the cotton-top has lost more than three-quarters of its original habitat to deforestation, while the lowland forest in which it lives has been reduced to 5% of its historical range. This land is then used for large-scale agricultural production (i.e. cattle) and farming, logging, oil palm plantations, and hydroelectric projects that fragment the cotton-top tamarin's natural range.

The illegal pet trade and scientific research have also been cited as factors by the IUCN. While biomedical studies have recently limited their use of this species, illegal capture for the pet trade still plays a major role in endangering the cotton-top. Before 1976, when CITES listed the species under Appendix I banning all international trade, the cotton-top tamarin was exported for use in biomedical research.

In captivity, the cotton-top is highly prone to colitis, which is linked to an increased risk of a certain type of colon cancer. Up to 40,000 individuals were caught and exported for research into those diseases, as well as Epstein–Barr virus, for the benefit of humans. The species is now protected by international law. Although enough individuals are in captivity to sustain the species, it is still critically endangered in the wild.

The Proyecto Tití ("Project Tamarin") was started in 1985 to provide information and support in conservation of the cotton-top tamarin and its habitat in northern Colombia. Proyecto Tití's programs combine field research, education, and community programs to spread awareness about this endangered species and encourage the public to participate in its protection. It now has partner status with the Wildlife Conservation Network.
