= Proyecto Tití =

Colombian non-profit organization

- Founded: 1985
- Type: Non-profit Organization
- Purpose: cottontop tamarin Conservation
- Location: Santa Catalina at Hacienda El Ceibal Colombia
- Region served: Colombia
- Field: Environmentalism
- Key people: Rosamira Guillen (Executive Director)
- Website: proyectotiti.com

The Proyecto Tití ("Project Tamarin") was founded in 1985, to provide information to assist in conservation of the cottontop tamarin (Saguinus oedipus) and their habitat in the tropical forests of Colombia. Proyecto Tití's programs combine field research, education and community programs. The cotton-top tamarin, is one of the most endangered primates in the world and is found only in North-Western Colombia.

== Programs ==
=== Research ===
Techniques such as radio telemetry, capture and release, hair dye allow Proyecto Tití's field researchers to identify individual tamarins and locate the groups.

=== Forest Protection ===
Proyecto Tití is working on projects to purchase land that contains the last contiguous forest in Northwestern Colombia suitable for cottontop survival. The project also works with local communities to restore and protect existing forest.

=== Clay Bindes ===
Clay bindes are small stoves made from termite mounds that help reduce the amount of firewood required by cooking over traditional open fires and thus reducing deforestation.

=== Eco-Mochila Project ===
The Eco-Mochila is a community-led project that works to take discarded trash and transform it into useful products. One example is plastic bags being transformed into colorfully designed, hand-knit mochilas (tote bags). The trash is recognized as a threat to the cottontop and other animals that may ingest them.

=== Conservation Education ===
The primary focus of Proyecto Tití is conservation education. The team educates local schoolchildren and adults about the forest environment and endemic animals and the threats they face.

== See also ==
- Wildlife Conservation Network
- Conservation movement
- Environmental movement
- Natural environment
- Sustainability
