= Greg Rasmussen =

British wildlife conservation biologist (born 1955)

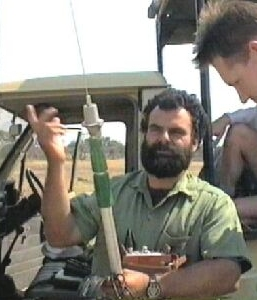
- Greg Rasmussen demonstrates his painted dog tracking device at Hwange Park in 1996
- Born: April 30, 1956 (age 70); London, United Kingdom
- Education: Falcon College
- Known for: Conservation of the African wild dog

Greg Rasmussen (born 30 April 1956) is a British wildlife conservation biologist.

Rasmussen is a research associate and part time lecturer at the University of Zimbabwe and is also affiliated with the Wildlife Conservation Research Unit at Oxford University.

== Background ==
Rasmussen was born in London and at eleven years old, his family moved to what was then Rhodesia (now Zimbabwe) where he developed a strong affinity for wildlife. After attending Falcon College, he joined the Merchant Navy and studied in Southampton at the Warsash Naval College. Even on the ships he took an interest in research, and in 1978 he received the Bracknell Award for his work on ocean currents in the Atlantic. In 1988, Joshua Ginsberg offered him a job observing painted dogs in Hwange National Park.

In 2003, Rasmussen was involved in a plane crash which left him severely injured and alone in the African bush. He survived and was eventually rescued. He almost lost his feet but doctors saved them, and as a result of the incident he is 3 inches (7.6 cm) shorter. The story of his survival is featured in season one of I Shouldn't Be Alive, a documentary series broadcast on the Discovery Channel in an episode entitled "Jaws of Death". In the United Kingdom, it was broadcast as "Thrown to the Lions" on Channel 4 where the series is called Alive.
